= Édouard Manet =

French painter (1832–1883)

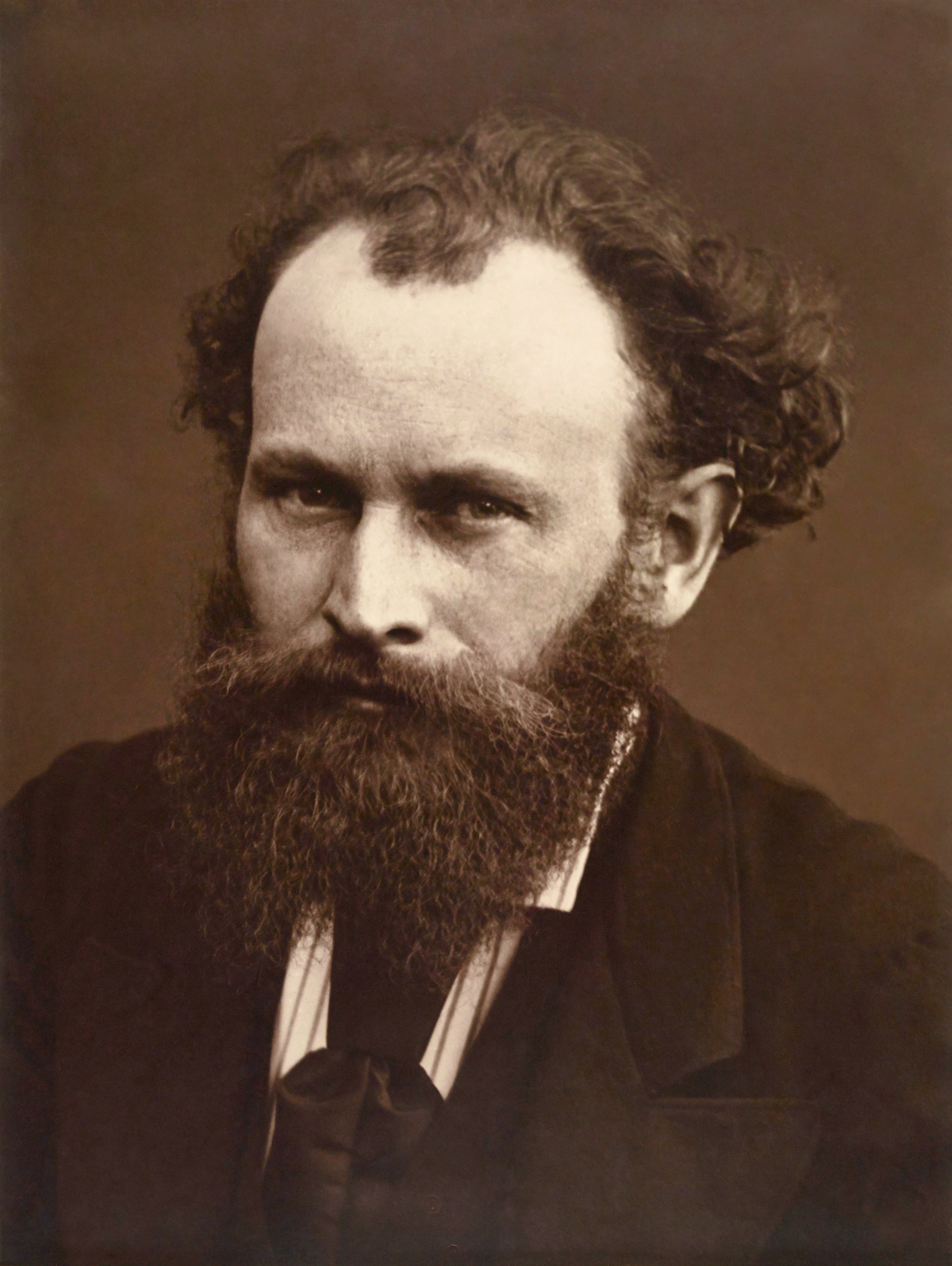
- Portrait photograph by Nadar, c. 1866–1867
- Born: 23 January 1832; Paris, France
- Died: 30 April 1883 (aged 51); Paris, France
- Resting place: Passy Cemetery, Paris
- Known for: Painting, printmaking
- Notable work: The Luncheon on the Grass (Le déjeuner sur l'herbe), 1863; Olympia, 1863; A Bar at the Folies-Bergère (Un Bar aux Folies-Bergère), 1882; Young Flautist or The Fifer (Le Fifre), 1866
- Movement: Realism, Impressionism
- Spouse: Suzanne Leenhoff (m. 1863)

Signature
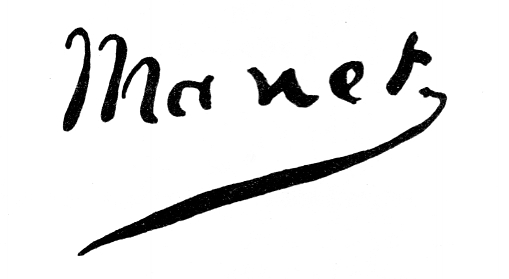

Édouard Manet (UK: /ˈmæneɪ/, US: /mæˈneɪ, məˈ-/; French: [edwaʁ manɛ]; 23 January 1832 – 30 April 1883) was a French modernist painter. He was one of the first 19th-century artists to paint modern life, as well as a pivotal figure in the transition from Realism to Impressionism.

Born into an upper-class household with strong political connections, Manet rejected the naval career originally envisioned for him; he became engrossed in the world of painting. His early masterworks, The Luncheon on the Grass (French: Le Déjeuner sur l'herbe) and Olympia, premiering in 1863 and '65, respectively, caused great controversy with both critics and the Academy of Fine Arts, but soon were praised by progressive artists as the breakthrough acts to the new style, Impressionism. These works, along with others, are considered watershed paintings that mark the start of modern art. The last 20 years of Manet's life saw him form bonds with other great artists of the time; he developed his own simple and direct style that would be heralded as innovative and serve as a major influence for future painters.

== Early life ==
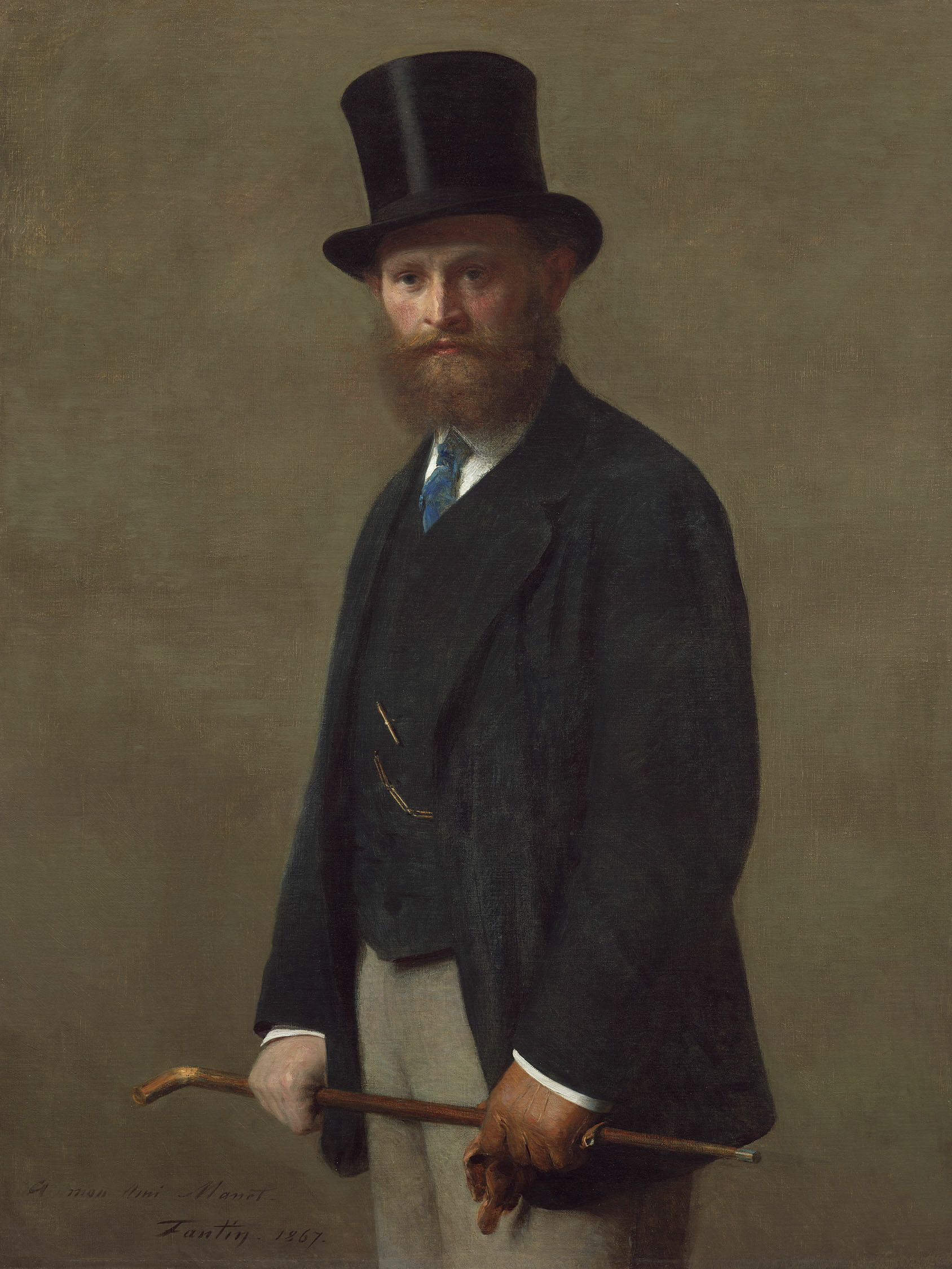
Édouard Manet by Henri Fantin-Latour (1867), Art Institute of Chicago

Édouard Manet was born in Paris on 23 January 1832, in the ancestral hôtel particulier (mansion) on the Rue des Petits Augustins (now Rue Bonaparte) to an affluent and well-connected family. He had two younger brothers, Eugène (born 1833) and Gustave (born 1835). His mother, Eugénie-Desirée Fournier, was the daughter of a diplomat and goddaughter of the Swedish crown prince Charles Bernadotte, from whom the Swedish monarchs are descended. His father, Auguste Manet, was a French judge who expected Édouard to pursue a career in law. His uncle, Edmond Fournier, encouraged him to pursue painting and took young Manet to the Louvre. In 1844, he enrolled at secondary school, the Collège Rollin, where he boarded until 1848. He showed little academic talent and was generally unhappy at the school. In 1845, at the advice of his uncle, Manet enrolled in a special course of drawing where he met Antonin Proust, future Minister of Fine Arts and his lifelong friend.

At his father's suggestion, in 1848 he sailed on a training vessel to Rio de Janeiro. After he twice failed the examination to join the Navy, his father relented to his wishes to pursue an art education. From 1850 to 1856, Manet studied under the academic painter Thomas Couture. Couture encouraged his students to paint contemporary life, though he would eventually be horrified by Manet's choice of lower-class and "degenerate" subjects such as The Absinthe Drinker. In his spare time, Manet copied Old Masters such as Diego Velázquez and Titian in the Louvre.

From 1853 to 1856, Manet made brief visits to Germany, Italy, and the Netherlands, during which time he was influenced by the Dutch painter Frans Hals and the Spanish artists Velázquez and Francisco José de Goya.

== Career ==
In 1856, Manet opened a studio. His style in this period was characterised by loose brush strokes, simplification of details, and the suppression of transitional tones. Adopting the current style of realism initiated by Gustave Courbet, he painted The Absinthe Drinker (1858–59) and other contemporary subjects such as beggars, singers, Romani, people in cafés, and bullfights. After his early career, he rarely painted religious, mythological, or historical subjects; religious paintings from 1864 include his Jesus Insulted by the Soldiers and The Dead Christ with Angels.

Manet had two canvases accepted at the Salon in 1861. A portrait of his mother and father (Portrait of Monsieur and Madame Manet), the latter of whom at the time was paralysed by a stroke or advanced syphilis, was ill-received by critics. The other, The Spanish Singer, was admired by Théophile Gautier, and placed in a more conspicuous location as a result of its popularity with Salon-goers. Manet's work, which appeared "slightly slapdash" when compared with the meticulous style of so many other Salon paintings, intrigued some young artists and brought new business to his studio. According to one contemporary source, The Spanish Singer, painted in a "strange new fashion[,] caused many painters' eyes to open and their jaws to drop." (Note: Quoting Desnoyers, Fernand (1863). Le Salon des Refusés (in French).)

=== Music in the Tuileries ===
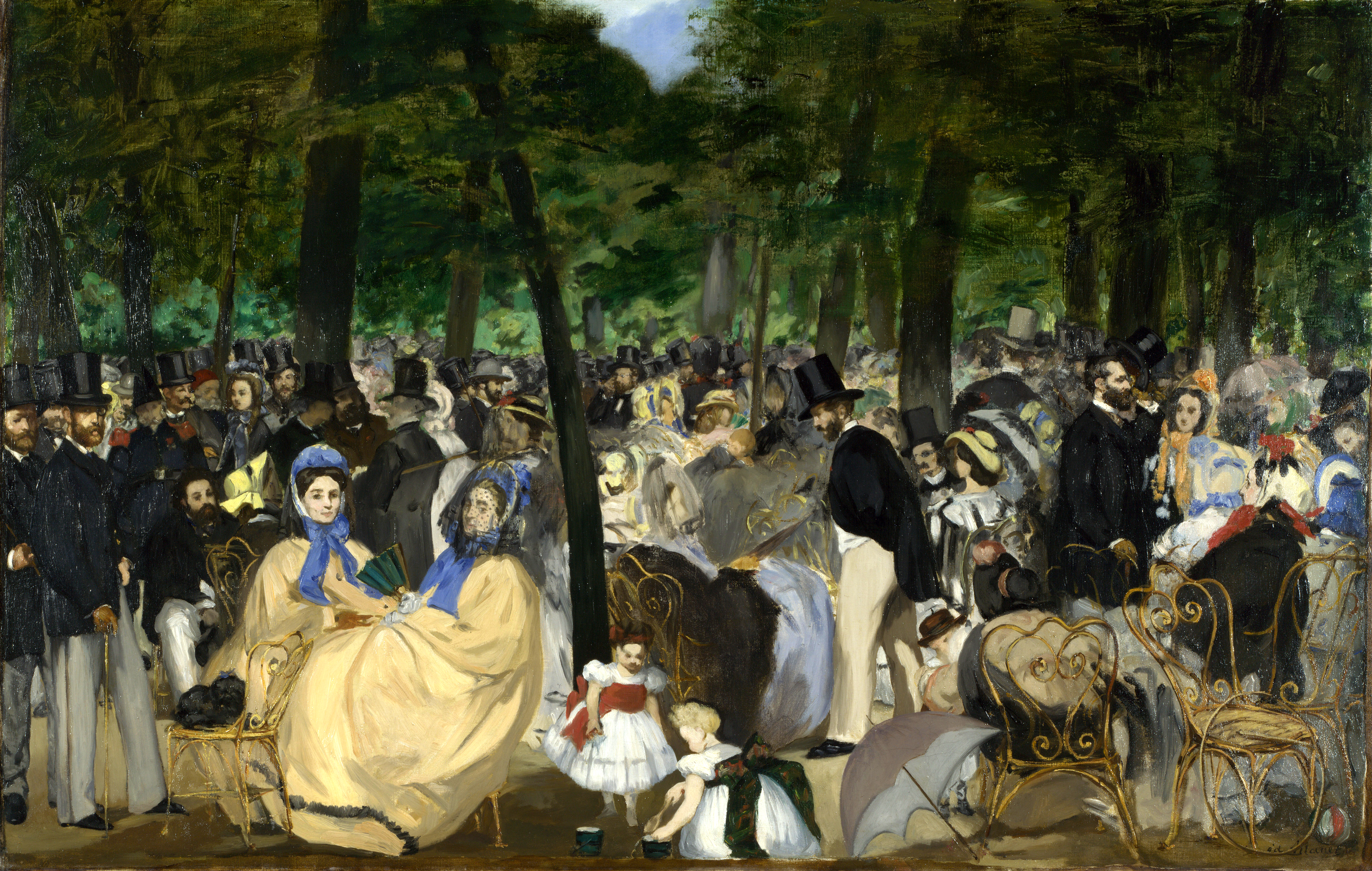
Music in the Tuileries, 1862

In 1862, Manet exhibited Music in the Tuileries (probably painted in 1860), one of his first masterpieces. With its portrayal of a crowd of subjects at the Tuileries Garden (Jardin des Tuileries), the painting shows the outdoor leisure of contemporary Paris, which would be a lifelong subject of Manet's. Among the figures in the gardens are the poet Charles Baudelaire, the musician Jacques Offenbach, and others of Manet's family and friends, including a self-portrait of the artist.

Music in the Tuileries received substantial critical and public attention, most of it negative. In the words of one Manet biographer, "it is difficult for us to imagine the kind of fury Music in the Tuileries provoked when it was exhibited". By portraying Manet's social circle instead of classical heroes, historical icons, or gods, the painting could be interpreted as challenging the value of those subjects or as an attempt to elevate his contemporaries to the same level. The public, accustomed to the finely detailed brushwork of historical painters such as Ernest Meissonier, thought Manet's thick brushstrokes looked crude and unfinished. Angered by the subject matter and technique, several visitors even threatened to destroy the painting. One of Manet's idols, Eugène Delacroix, was one of the painting's few defenders. Despite the largely negative reaction, the controversy made Manet a well-known name in Paris.

=== The Luncheon on the Grass (Le Déjeuner sur l'herbe) ===
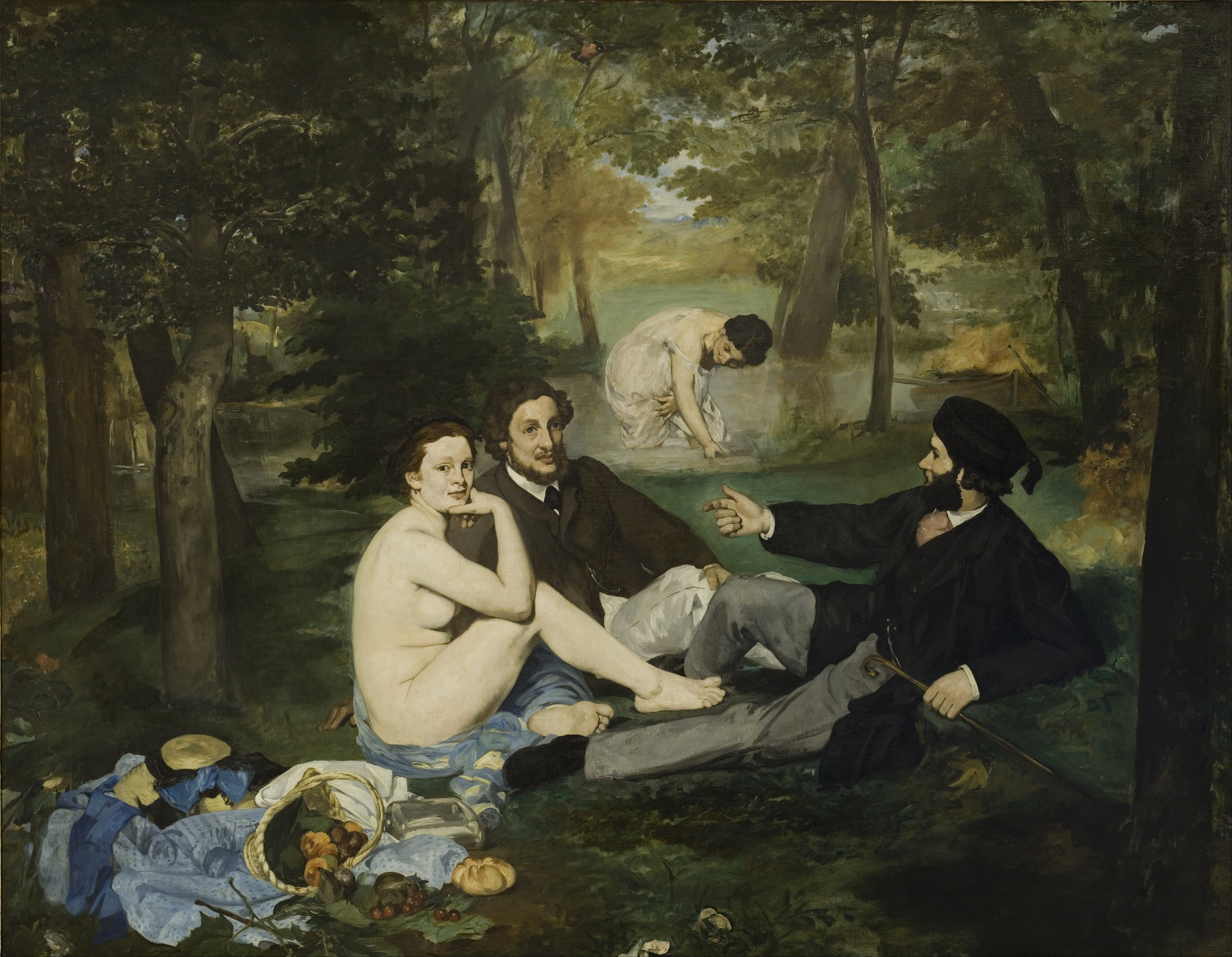
Le Déjeuner sur l'herbe, 'The Luncheon on the Grass' (1863)

Another major early work is The Luncheon on the Grass (French: Le Déjeuner sur l'herbe; The Luncheon for short), originally Le Bain. The Paris Salon rejected it for exhibition in 1863, but Manet agreed to exhibit it at the Salon des Refusés ('Salon of the Rejected'). This parallel salon was initiated by Emperor Napoleon III as a solution to the public outcry after the official salon's Selection Committee only accepted 2,217 paintings out of more than 5,000 submissions. It allowed rejected artists to display their paintings if they chose.

The painting's juxtaposition of fully dressed men and a nude woman was controversial, as was its abbreviated, sketch-like handling, an innovation that distinguished Manet from Courbet. One critic stated that the brushwork appeared to have been done with a "floor mop". However, others such as his friend Antonin Proust celebrated the painting, and novelist Émile Zola was so affected by the experience of viewing it that he later based the title painting in his novel L'Œuvre ('The Work of Art') on Le Déjeuner sur l'herbe.

At the same time, Manet's composition reveals his study of the old masters, as the disposition of the main figures is derived from Marcantonio Raimondi's engraving of the Judgement of Paris (c. 1515) based on a drawing by Raphael. Two additional works cited by scholars as important precedents for Le Déjeuner sur l'herbe are Pastoral Concert (c. 1510) and The Tempest, both of which are attributed variously to Italian Renaissance masters Giorgione or Titian.

The Luncheon and James McNeill Whistler's Symphony in White, No. 1: The White Girl were the two most discussed works of the Salon des Refusés, which itself would become one of the most famous art exhibitions of all time. Following the Salon, Manet became yet more notorious and widely discussed. However, The Luncheon and Manet's other paintings still failed to sell, and Manet continued living off of his inheritance from his recently deceased father.

=== Olympia ===
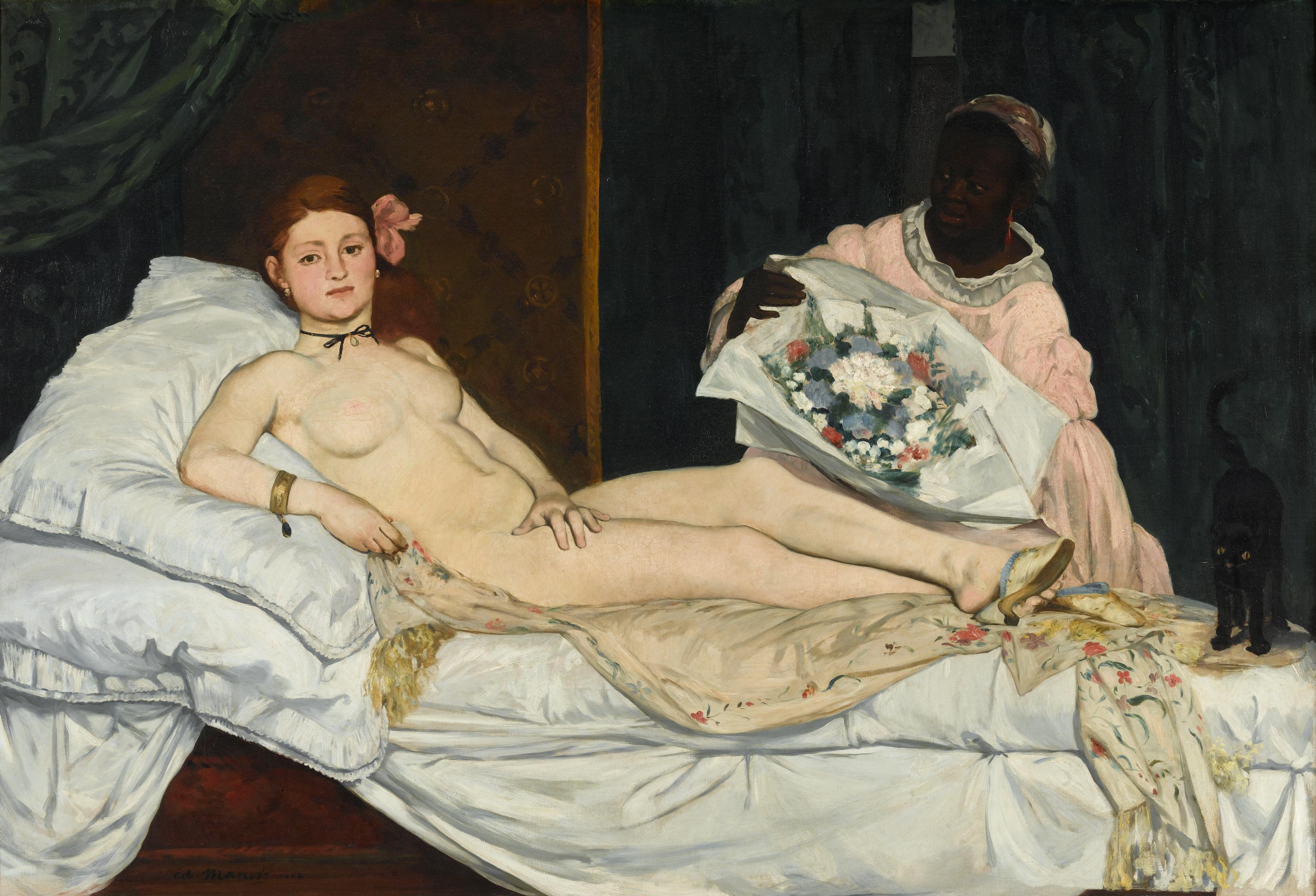
Olympia (1863–65), oil on canvas, Musée d'Orsay

As he had in The Luncheon on the Grass, Manet again paraphrased a respected work by a Renaissance artist in the painting Olympia (1863), a nude portrayed in a style reminiscent of early studio photographs, but whose pose was based on Titian's Venus of Urbino (1538). The painting is also reminiscent of Francisco Goya's painting The Nude Maja (1800).

Manet embarked on the canvas after being challenged to give the Salon a nude painting to display. His uniquely frank depiction of a self-assured prostitute was accepted by the Paris Salon in 1865, where it created a scandal. According to Antonin Proust, "only the precautions taken by the administration prevented the painting being punctured and torn" by offended viewers. The painting was controversial partly because the nude is wearing some small items of clothing such as an orchid in her hair, a bracelet, a ribbon around her neck, and mule slippers, all of which accentuated her nakedness, sexuality, and comfortable courtesan lifestyle. The orchid, upswept hair, black cat, and bouquet of flowers were all recognised symbols of sexuality at the time. This modern Venus' body is thin, counter to prevailing standards; the painting's lack of idealism rankled viewers. The painting's flatness, inspired by Japanese wood block art, serves to make the nude more human and less voluptuous. A fully dressed black servant is featured, exploiting the then-current theory that black people were hyper-sexed. That she is wearing the clothing of a servant to a courtesan here furthers the sexual tension of the piece.

Olympia's body as well as her gaze is unabashedly confrontational. She defiantly looks out as her servant offers flowers from one of her male suitors. Although her hand rests on her leg, hiding her pubic area, the reference to traditional female virtue is ironic; a notion of modesty is notoriously absent in this work. A contemporary critic denounced Olympia's "shamelessly flexed" left hand, which seemed to him a mockery of the relaxed, shielding hand of Titian's Venus. Likewise, the alert black cat at the foot of the bed strikes a sexually rebellious note in contrast to that of the sleeping dog in Titian's portrayal of the goddess in his Venus of Urbino.

Olympia was the subject of caricatures in the popular press, but was championed by the French avant-garde community, and the painting's significance was appreciated by artists such as Gustave Courbet, Paul Cézanne, Claude Monet, and later Paul Gauguin.

As with The Luncheon, the painting raised the issue of prostitution within contemporary France and the roles of women within society.

=== Life and times ===
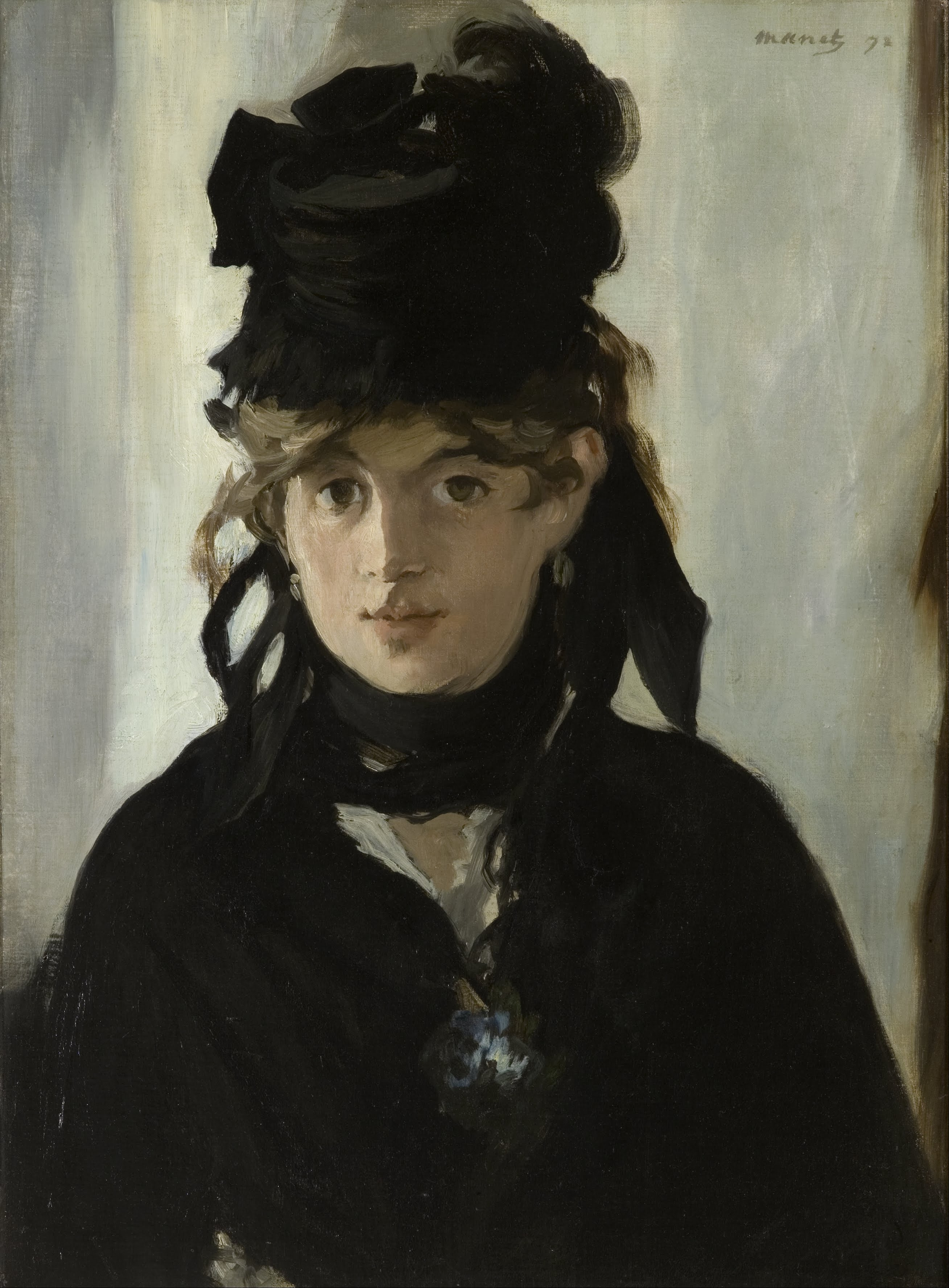
Berthe Morisot with a Bouquet of Violets, 1872

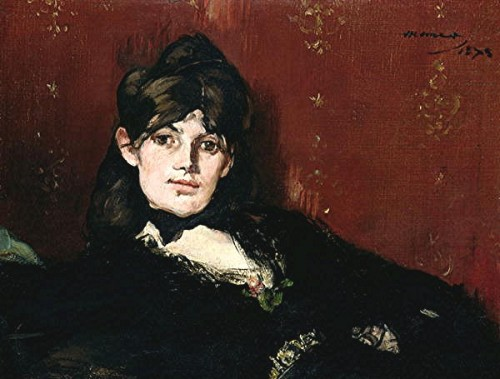
Berthe Morisot reclining, 1873

After the death of his father in 1862, Manet married Suzanne Leenhoff in 1863 at a Protestant church. Leenhoff was a Dutch-born piano teacher two years Manet's senior with whom he had been romantically involved for approximately ten years. Leenhoff initially had been employed by Manet's father, Auguste, to teach Manet and his younger brother piano. She also may have been Auguste's mistress. In 1852, Leenhoff gave birth, out of wedlock, to a son, Léon Koëlla Leenhoff.

Manet painted his wife in The Reading, among other paintings. Her son, Léon Leenhoff, whose father may have been either of the Manets, "posed for Manet eighteen times in paintings that date between 1859 and 1872". Most famously, he is the subject of the Boy Carrying a Sword (1861) and the Boy Blowing Bubbles (1867). He also appears as the boy carrying a tray in the background of The Balcony (1868–69).

Manet became friends with the Impressionists Edgar Degas, Claude Monet, Pierre-Auguste Renoir, Alfred Sisley, Paul Cézanne, and Camille Pissarro through another painter, Berthe Morisot, who was a member of the group and drew him into their activities. They later became widely known as the Batignolles group (Le groupe des Batignolles).

The supposed grand-niece of the painter Jean-Honoré Fragonard, Morisot had her first painting accepted in the Salon de Paris in 1864, and she continued to show in the salon for the next ten years.

Manet became the friend and colleague of Morisot in 1868. She is credited with convincing Manet to attempt plein air painting, which she had been practicing since she was introduced to it by another friend of hers, Camille Corot. They had a reciprocating relationship and Manet incorporated some of her techniques into his paintings. In 1874, she became his sister-in-law when she married his brother, Eugène. It has been speculated that there was a repressed love between Manet and Morisot, exemplified by the numerous portraits he did of her before she married his brother.

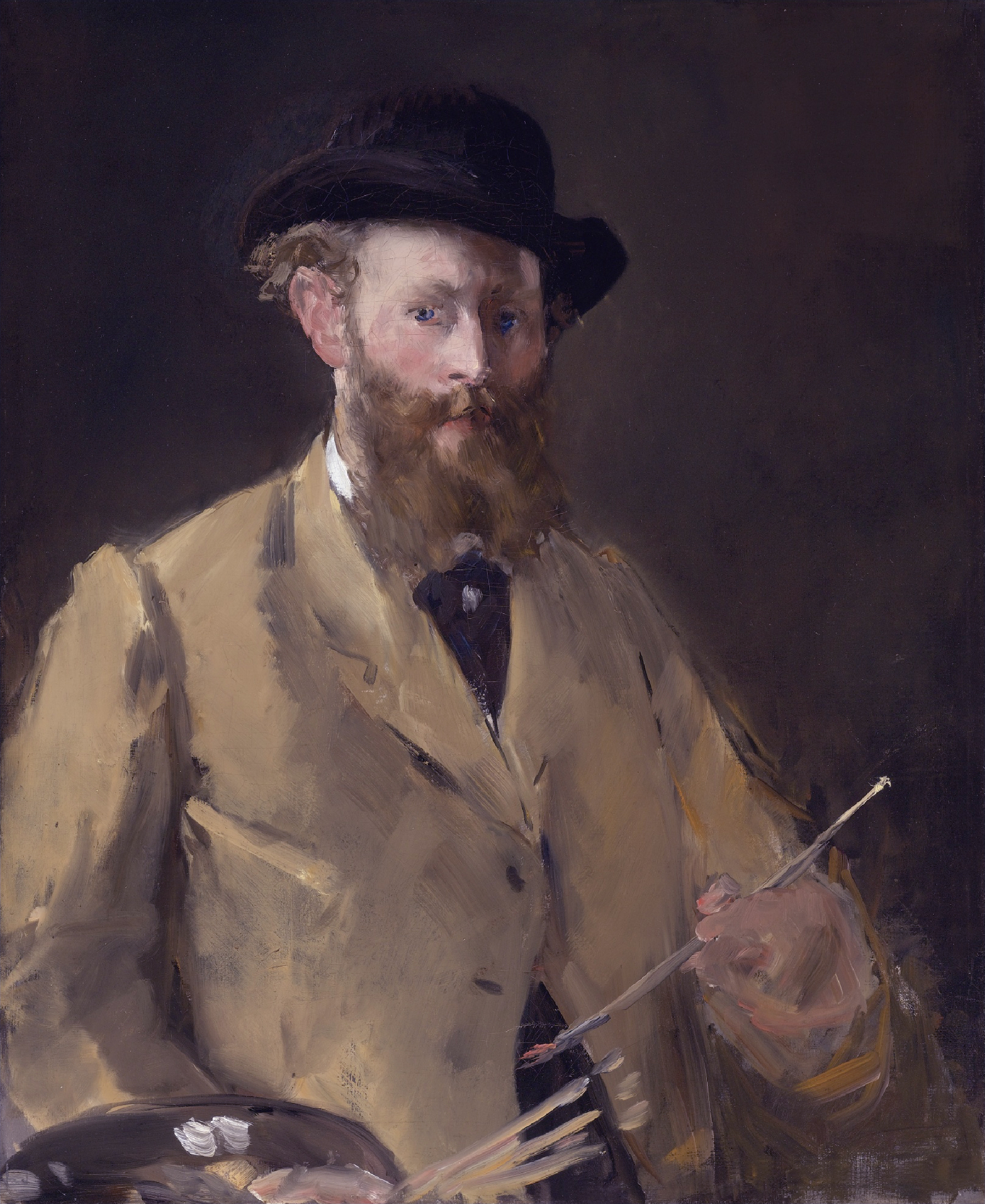
Self-Portrait with Palette (1879)

Unlike the core Impressionist group, Manet maintained that modern artists should seek to exhibit at the Paris Salon rather than abandon it in favour of independent exhibitions. Nevertheless, when Manet was excluded from the International Exhibition of 1867, he set up his own exhibition. His mother worried that he would waste all his inheritance on this project, which was enormously expensive. While the exhibition earned poor reviews from the major critics, it also provided his first contacts with several future Impressionist painters, including Degas.

Although his own work influenced and anticipated the Impressionist style, Manet resisted involvement in Impressionist exhibitions, partly because he did not wish to be seen as the representative of a group identity, and partly because he preferred to exhibit at the Salon. Eva Gonzalès, a daughter of the novelist Emmanuel Gonzalès, was his only formal student.

He was influenced by the Impressionists, especially Monet and Morisot. Their influence is seen in Manet's use of lighter colours: after the early 1870s he made less use of dark backgrounds but retained his distinctive use of black, uncharacteristic of Impressionist painting. He painted many outdoor (plein air) pieces, but always returned to what he considered the serious work of the studio.

Manet enjoyed a close friendship with composer Emmanuel Chabrier, painting two portraits of him; the musician owned 14 of Manet's paintings and dedicated his Impromptu to Manet's wife.

One of Manet's frequent models at the beginning of the 1880s was the "semimondaine" Méry Laurent, who posed for seven portraits in pastel. Laurent's salons hosted many French (and even American) writers and painters of her time; Manet had connections and influence through such events.

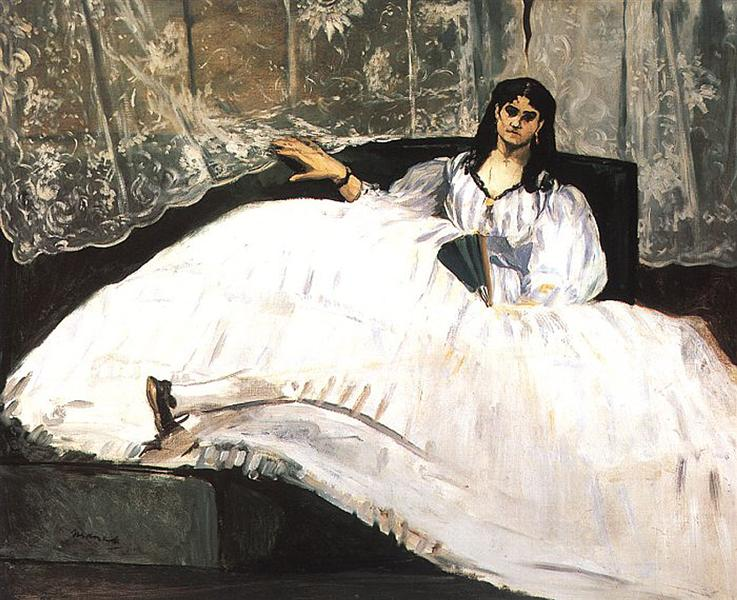
Baudelaire's Mistress (Portrait of Jeanne Duval) (1862)

Throughout his life, although resisted by art critics, Manet could number as his champions Émile Zola, who supported him publicly in the press, Stéphane Mallarmé and Charles Baudelaire, who challenged him to depict life as it was. Manet, in turn, drew or painted each of them.

=== Café scenes ===
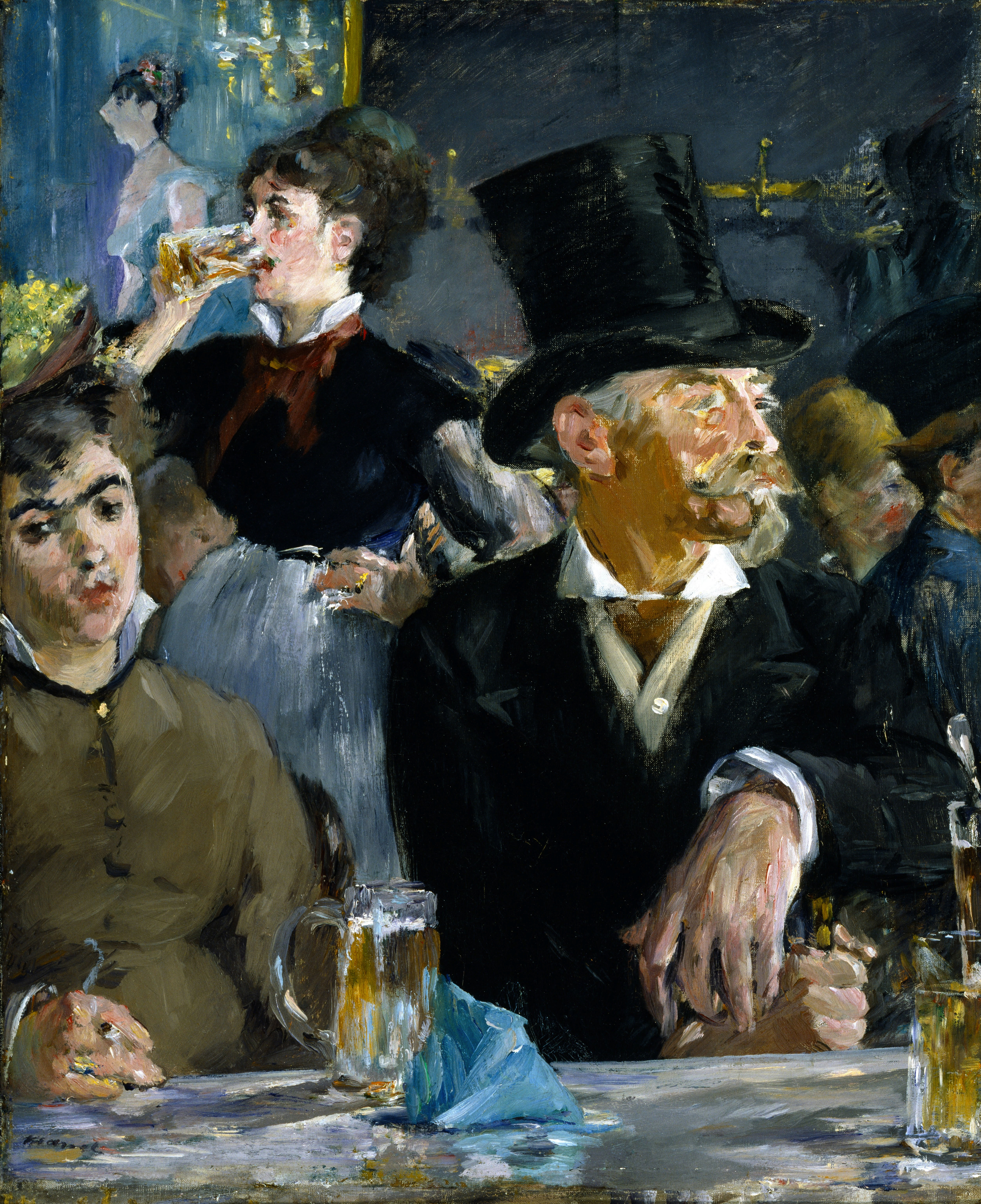
The Café-Concert (1878), Walters Art Museum. Scene set in the Cabaret de Reichshoffen on the Boulevard Rochechouart, where women on the fringes of society freely intermingled with well-heeled gentlemen.

Manet's paintings of café scenes are observations of social life in 19th-century Paris. People are depicted drinking beer, listening to music, flirting, reading, or waiting. Many of these paintings were based on sketches executed on the spot. Manet often visited the Brasserie Reichshoffen on boulevard de Rochechourt, upon which he based At the Cafe in 1878. Several people are at the bar, and one woman confronts the viewer while others wait to be served. Such depictions represent the painted journal of a flâneur. These are painted in a style which is loose, referencing Frans Hals and Diego Velázquez, yet they capture the mood and feeling of Parisian night life. They are painted snapshots of bohemianism, urban working people, as well as some of the bourgeoisie.

In Corner of a Café-Concert, a man smokes while behind him a waitress serves drinks. In The Beer Drinkers a woman enjoys her beer in the company of a friend. In The Café-Concert, shown at right, a sophisticated gentleman sits at a bar while a waitress stands resolutely in the background, sipping her drink. In The Waitress, a serving woman pauses for a moment behind a seated customer smoking a pipe, while a ballet dancer, with arms extended as she is about to turn, is on stage in the background.

Manet also sat at the restaurant on the Avenue de Clichy called Pere Lathuille's, which had a garden in addition to the dining area. One of the paintings he produced here was Chez le Père Lathuille ('At Pere Lathuille's'), in which a man displays an unrequited interest in a woman dining near him.

In Le Bon Bock (1873), a large, cheerful, bearded man sits with a pipe in one hand and a glass of beer in the other, looking straight at the viewer.

=== Paintings of social activities ===
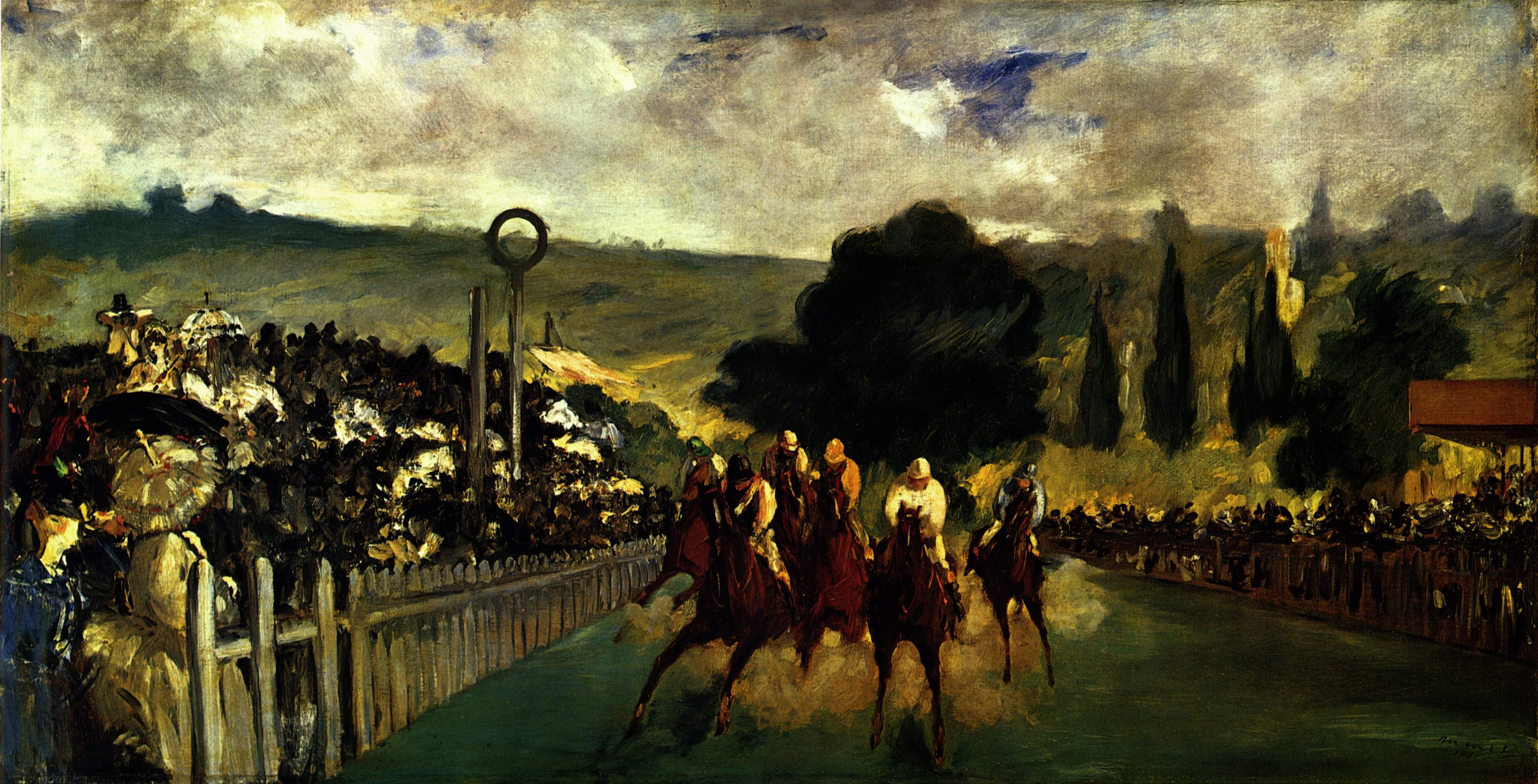
The Races at Longchamp, 1864

Manet painted the upper class enjoying more formal social activities. In Masked Ball at the Opera, Manet shows a lively crowd of people enjoying a party. Men stand with top hats and long black suits while talking to women with masks and costumes. He included portraits of his friends in this picture.

His 1868 painting The Luncheon was posed in the dining room of the Manet house.

Manet depicted other popular activities in his work. In The Races at Longchamp, an unusual perspective is employed to underscore the furious energy of racehorses as they rush toward the viewer. In Skating, Manet shows a well dressed woman in the foreground, while others skate behind her. Always there is the sense of active urban life continuing behind the subject, extending outside the frame of the canvas.

In View of the International Exhibition, soldiers relax, seated and standing, prosperous couples are talking. There is a gardener, a boy with a dog, a woman on horseback—in short, a sample of the classes and ages of the people of Paris.

=== War ===
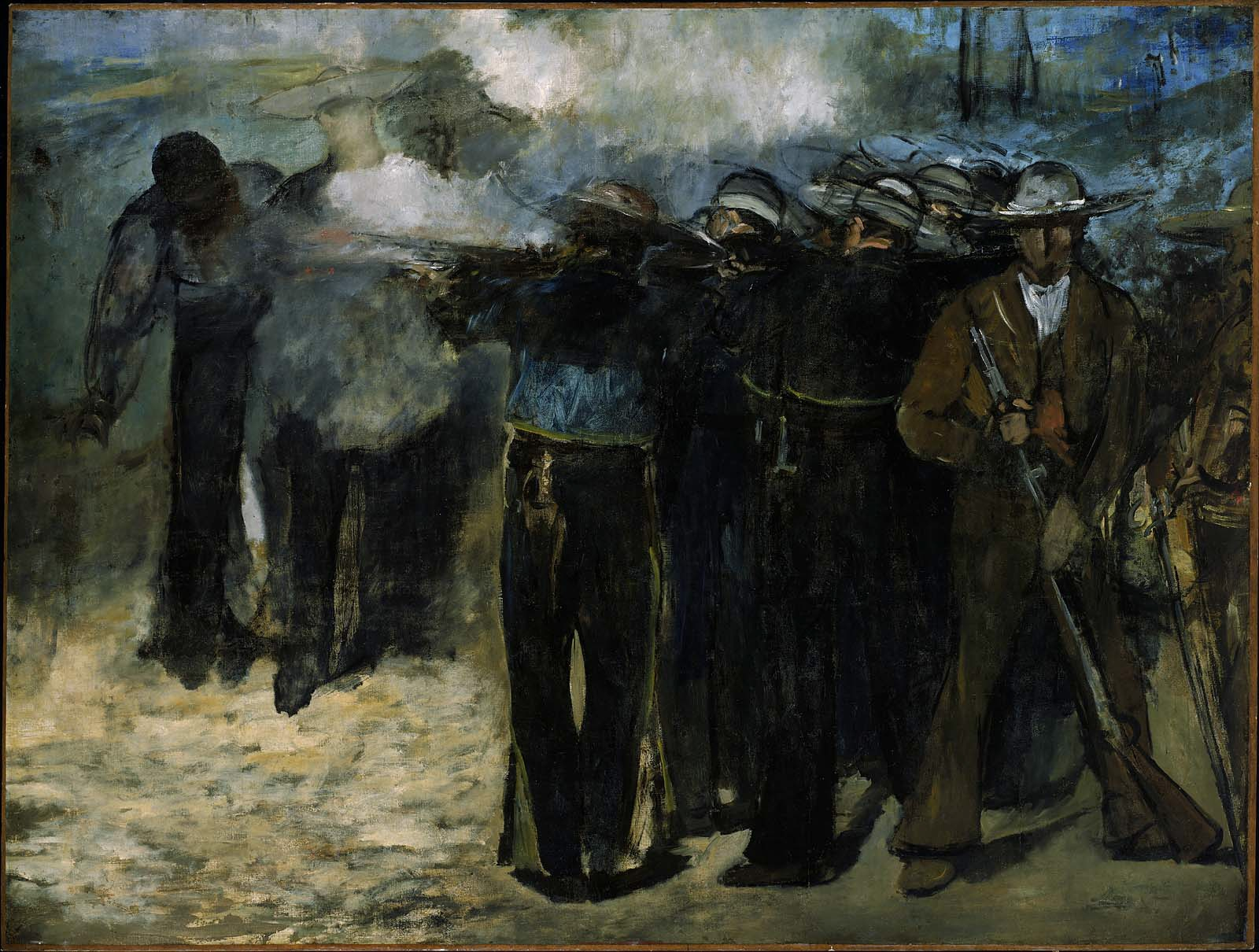
The Execution of Emperor Maximilian (1867). Museum of Fine Arts Boston. The least finished of three large canvases devoted to the execution of Maximilian I of Mexico.

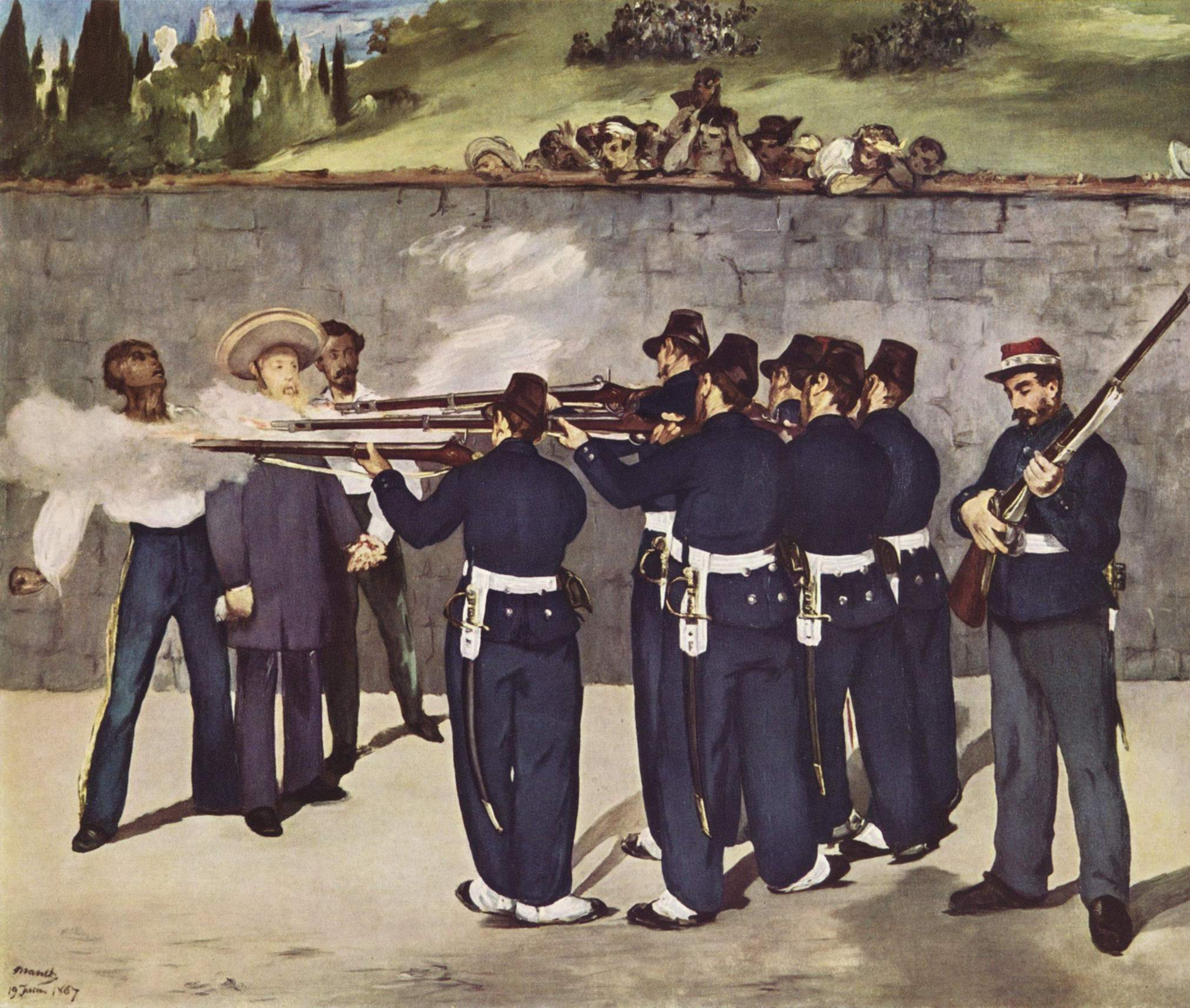
The Execution of Emperor Maximilian (1868), Kunsthalle Mannheim

Manet's response to modern life included works devoted to war, in subjects that may be seen as updated interpretations of the genre of "history painting". The first such work was The Battle of the Kearsarge and the Alabama (1864), a sea skirmish known as the Battle of Cherbourg from the American Civil War which took place off the French coast, and may have been witnessed by the artist.

Of interest next was the French intervention in Mexico; from 1867 to 1869, Manet painted three versions of the Execution of Emperor Maximilian, an event which raised concerns regarding French foreign and domestic policy. The several versions of the Execution are among Manet's largest paintings, which suggests that the theme was one which the painter regarded as most important. Its subject is the execution by Mexican firing squad of a Habsburg emperor who had been installed by Napoleon III. Neither the paintings nor a lithograph of the subject was permitted to be shown in France. As an indictment of formalised slaughter, the paintings look back to Goya, and anticipate Picasso's Guernica.

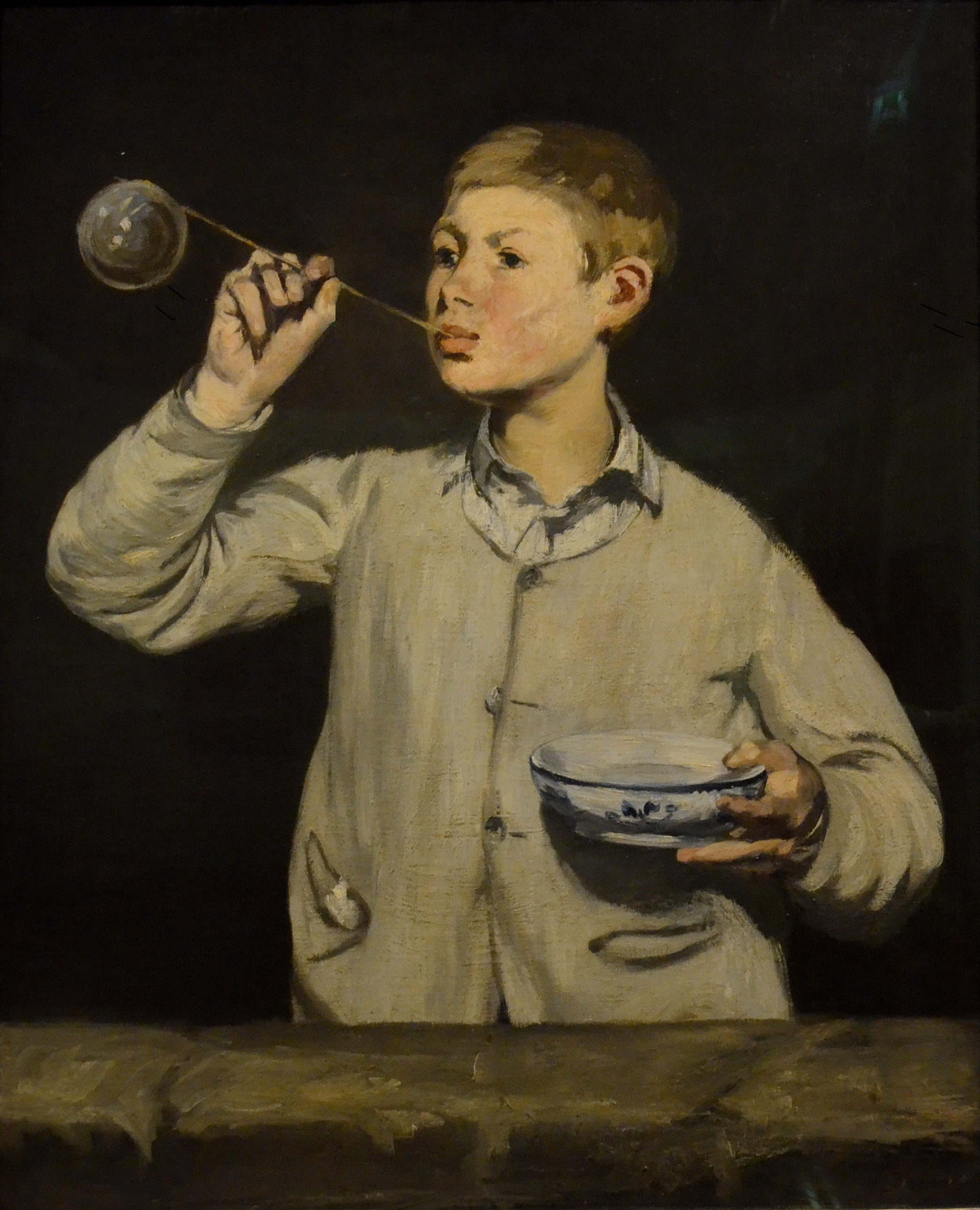
Boy Blowing Bubbles (1867), Calouste Gulbenkian Museum. Manet paints about the fleetingness of life, a theme traditionally represented by soap bubbles in painting

During the Franco-Prussian War, Manet served in the National Guard to help defend the city during the siege of Paris, along with Degas. In January 1871, he travelled to Oloron-Sainte-Marie in the Pyrenees. In his absence his friends added his name to the "Fédération des artistes" (Note: See Gustave Courbet) of the Paris Commune. Manet stayed away from Paris, perhaps, until after the semaine sanglante: in a letter to Berthe Morisot at Cherbourg (10 June 1871) he writes, "We came back to Paris a few days ago..." (the semaine sanglante ended on 28 May).

The prints and drawings collection of the Museum of Fine Arts Budapest has a watercolour-gouache by Manet, The Barricade, depicting a summary execution of Communards by Versailles troops based on a lithograph of the execution of Maximilian. A similar piece, The Barricade (oil on plywood), is held by a private collector.

On 18 March 1871, he wrote to his (confederate) friend Félix Bracquemond in Paris about his visit to Bordeaux, the provisional seat of the French National Assembly of the Third French Republic where Émile Zola introduced him to the sites: "I never imagined that France could be represented by such doddering old fools, not excepting that little twit Thiers..." If this could be interpreted as support of the Commune, a following letter to Bracquemond (21 March 1871) expressed his idea more clearly: "Only party hacks and the ambitious, the Henrys of this world following on the heels of the Milliéres, the grotesque imitators of the Commune of 1793". He knew the communard Lucien Henry to have been a former painter's model and Millière, an insurance agent. "What an encouragement all these bloodthirsty caperings are for the arts! But there is at least one consolation in our misfortunes: that we're not politicians and have no desire to be elected as deputies".

The public figure Manet admired most was the republican Léon Gambetta. In the heat of the seize mai coup in 1877, Manet opened up his atelier to a republican electoral meeting chaired by Gambetta's friend Eugène Spuller.

=== Paris ===
Manet depicted many scenes of the streets of Paris in his works. The Rue Mosnier Decked with Flags depicts red, white, and blue pennants covering buildings on either side of the street; another painting of the same title features a one-legged man walking with crutches. Again depicting the same street, but this time in a different context, is Rue Mosnier with Pavers, in which men repair the roadway while people and horses move past.

The Railway (1873)

The Railway (The Gare Saint-Lazare) was painted in 1873. The setting is the urban landscape of Paris in the late 19th century. Using his favourite model in his last painting of her, a fellow painter, Victorine Meurent, also the model for Olympia and the Luncheon on the Grass, sits before an iron fence holding a sleeping puppy and an open book in her lap. Next to her is a little girl with her back to the painter, watching a train pass beneath them.

Instead of choosing the traditional natural view as background for an outdoor scene, Manet opts for the iron grating which "boldly stretches across the canvas". The only evidence of the train is its white cloud of steam. In the distance, modern apartment buildings are seen. This arrangement compresses the foreground into a narrow focus. The traditional convention of deep space is ignored.

Historian Isabelle Dervaux has described the reception this painting received when it was first exhibited at the official Paris Salon of 1874: "Visitors and critics found its subject baffling, its composition incoherent, and its execution sketchy. Caricaturists ridiculed Manet's picture, in which only a few recognised the symbol of modernity that it has become today". The painting is currently in the National Gallery of Art Washington.

Manet painted several boating subjects in 1874. Boating, now in the Metropolitan Museum of Art, exemplifies in its conciseness the lessons Manet learned from Japanese prints, and the abrupt cropping by the frame of the boat and sail adds to the immediacy of the image.

In 1875, a book-length French edition of Edgar Allan Poe's The Raven included lithographs by Manet and translation by Mallarmé.

In 1881, with pressure from his friend Antonin Proust, the French government awarded Manet the Légion d'honneur.

=== Late works ===
A Bar at the Folies-Bergère (1882), Courtauld Gallery

In his mid-forties Manet's health deteriorated, and he developed severe pain and partial paralysis in his legs. In 1879 he began receiving hydrotherapy treatments at a spa near Meudon intended to improve what he believed was a circulatory problem, but in reality he was suffering from locomotor ataxia, a known side-effect of syphilis. In 1880, he painted a portrait there of the opera singer Émilie Ambre as Carmen. Ambre and her lover Gaston de Beauplan had an estate in Meudon and had organised the first exhibition of Manet's The Execution of Emperor Maximilian in New York in December 1879.

In his last years Manet painted many small-scale still lifes of fruits and vegetables, such as A Bundle of Asparagus and The Lemon (both 1880). He completed his last major work, A Bar at the Folies-Bergère (Un Bar aux Folies-Bergère), in 1882, and it hung in the Salon that year. Afterwards, he limited himself to small formats.

Manet's last paintings were of flowers in glass vases. There are 20 such paintings known, with the last one painted in March 1883, barely two months before his death. Quoted in Venice thirteen years later, Manet is credited with stating that an artist can say everything he has to say with "flowers, fruit, and clouds." His last flower paintings are a demonstration of that belief.

In 2023, the Metropolitan Museum of Art in New York City exhibited a two-person exhibition of Manet with Degas.

== Death ==
In April 1883, Manet's left foot was amputated because of gangrene caused by complications from syphilis and rheumatism. He died 11 days later on 30 April in Paris and is buried in the Passy Cemetery in the city.

== Legacy ==
Manet's public career lasted from 1861, the year of his first participation in the Salon, until his death in 1883. His known extant works, as catalogued in 1975 by Denis Rouart and Daniel Wildenstein, comprise 430 oil paintings, 89 pastels, and more than 400 works on paper.

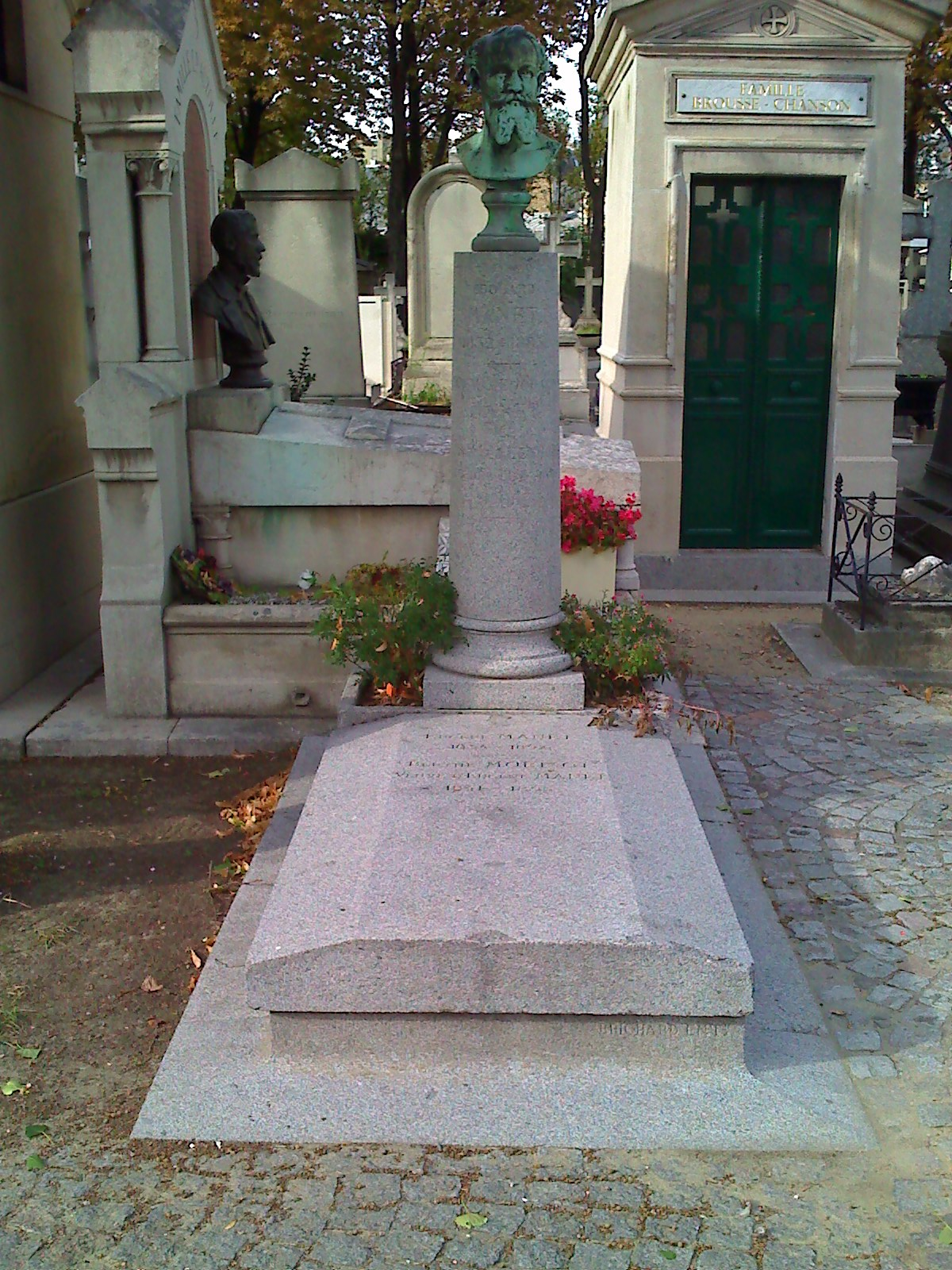
The grave of Manet at Passy Cemetery

Although harshly condemned by critics who decried its lack of conventional finish, Manet's work had admirers from the beginning. One was Émile Zola, who wrote in 1867: "We are not accustomed to seeing such simple and direct translations of reality. Then, as I said, there is such a surprisingly elegant awkwardness ... it is a truly charming experience to contemplate this luminous and serious painting which interprets nature with a gentle brutality."

The roughly painted style and photographic lighting in Manet's paintings was seen as specifically modern, and as a challenge to the Renaissance works he copied or used as source material. He rejected the technique he had learned in the studio of Thomas Couture – in which a painting was constructed using successive layers of paint on a dark-toned ground – in favour of a direct, alla prima method using opaque paint on a light ground. Novel at the time, this method made possible the completion of a painting in a single sitting. It was adopted by the Impressionists, and became the prevalent method of painting in oils for generations that followed. Manet's work is considered "early modern", partially because of the opaque flatness of his surfaces, the frequent sketch-like passages, and the black outlining of figures, all of which draw attention to the surface of the picture plane and the material quality of paint.

The art historian Beatrice Farwell says Manet "has been universally regarded as the Father of Modernism. With Courbet he was among the first to take serious risks with the public whose favour he sought, the first to make alla prima painting the standard technique for oil painting and one of the first to take liberties with Renaissance perspective and to offer 'pure painting' as a source of aesthetic pleasure. He was a pioneer, again with Courbet, in the rejection of humanistic and historical subject-matter, and shared with Degas the establishment of modern urban life as acceptable material for high art."

=== Art market ===
The late Manet painting, Le Printemps (1881), sold to the J. Paul Getty Museum for US$65.1 million, setting a new auction record for Manet, exceeding its pre-sale estimate of US$25–35 million at Christie's on 5 November 2014. The previous auction record was held by his Self-Portrait with Palette, which sold for US$33.2 million at Sotheby's on 22 June 2010.

== Gallery ==
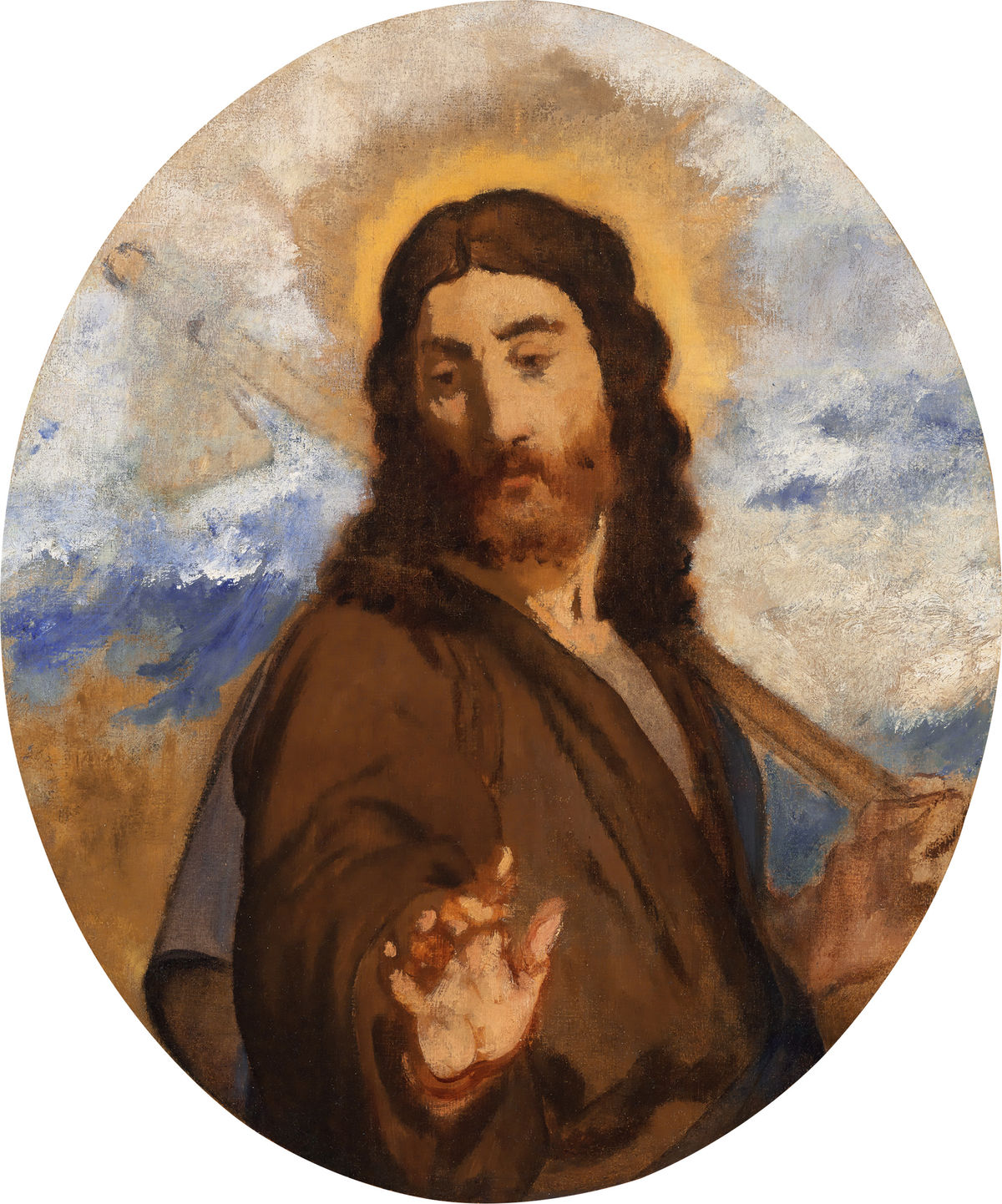
Christ as a Gardener, c. 1856–1859, Private Collection

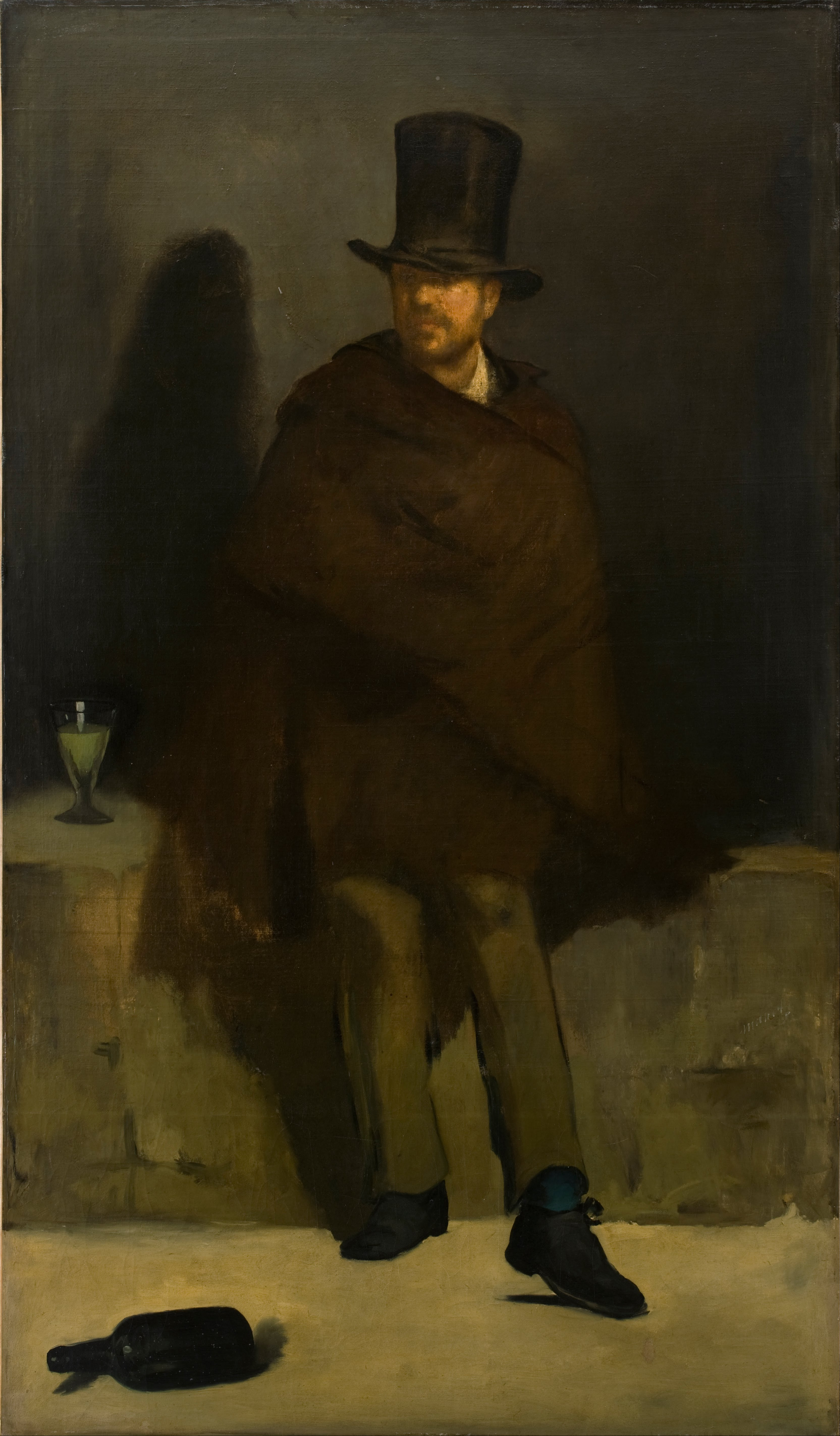
The Absinthe Drinker c. 1859, Ny Carlsberg Glyptotek

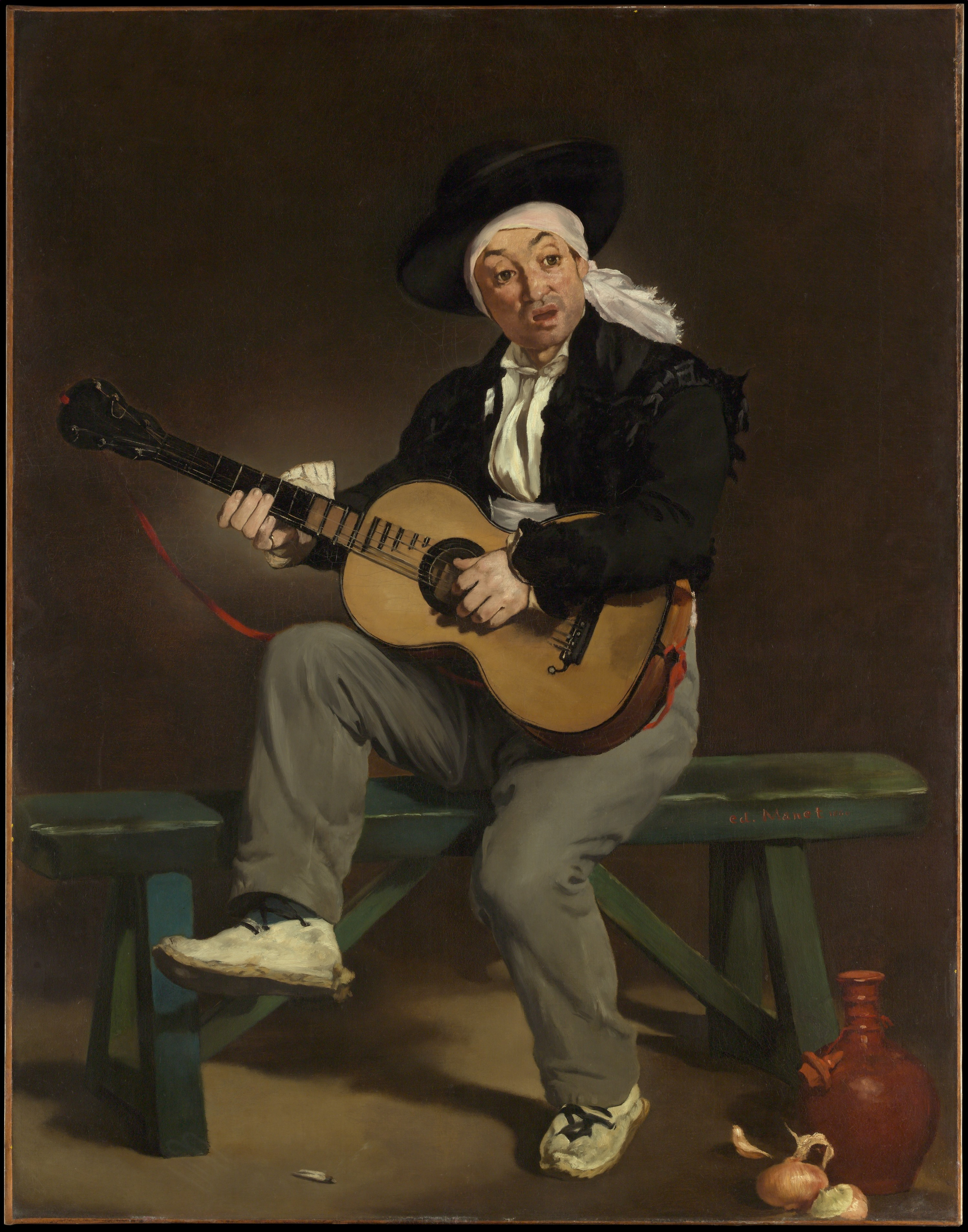
The Spanish Singer, 1860, Metropolitan Museum of Art

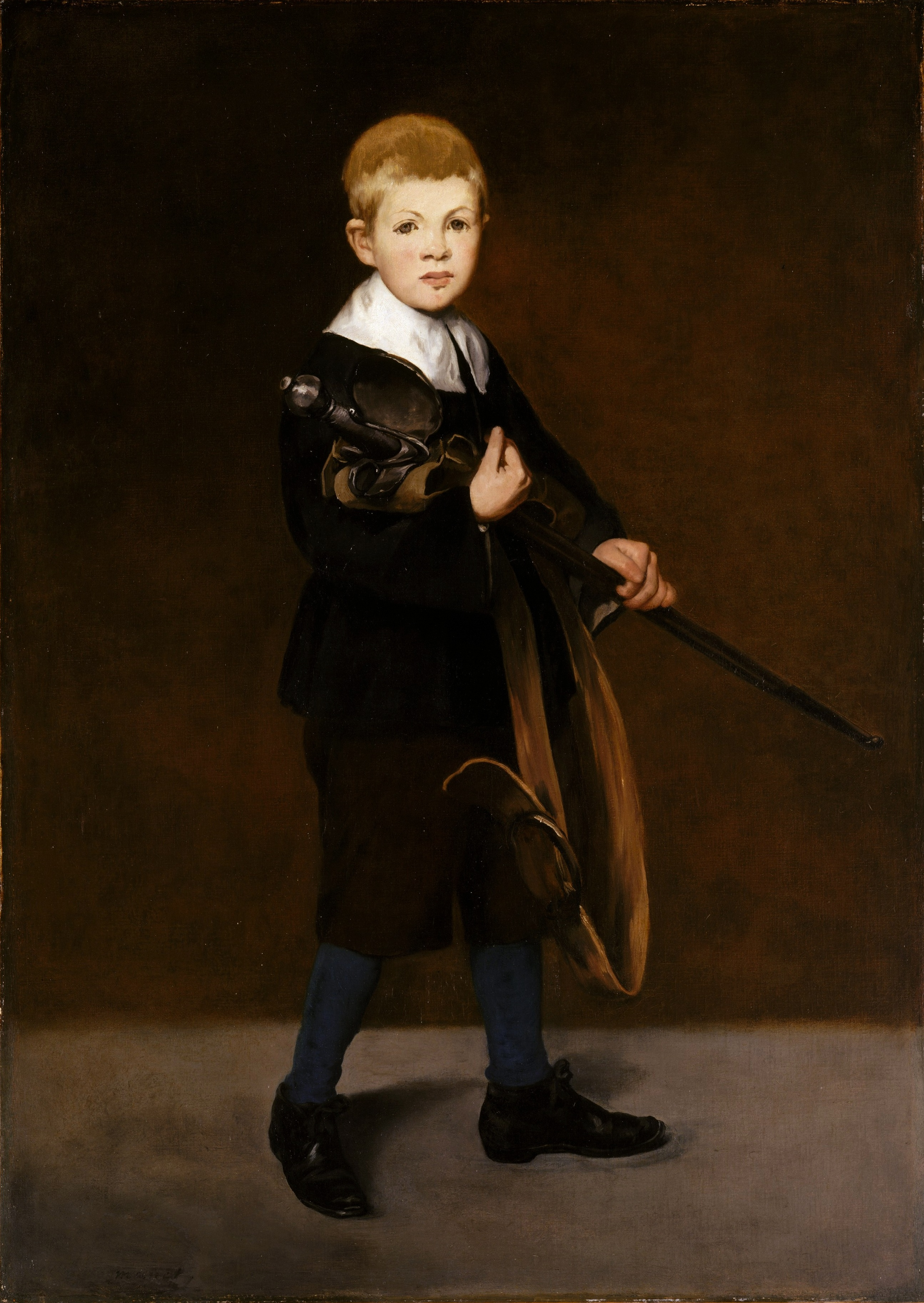
Boy Carrying a Sword, 1861, Metropolitan Museum of Art

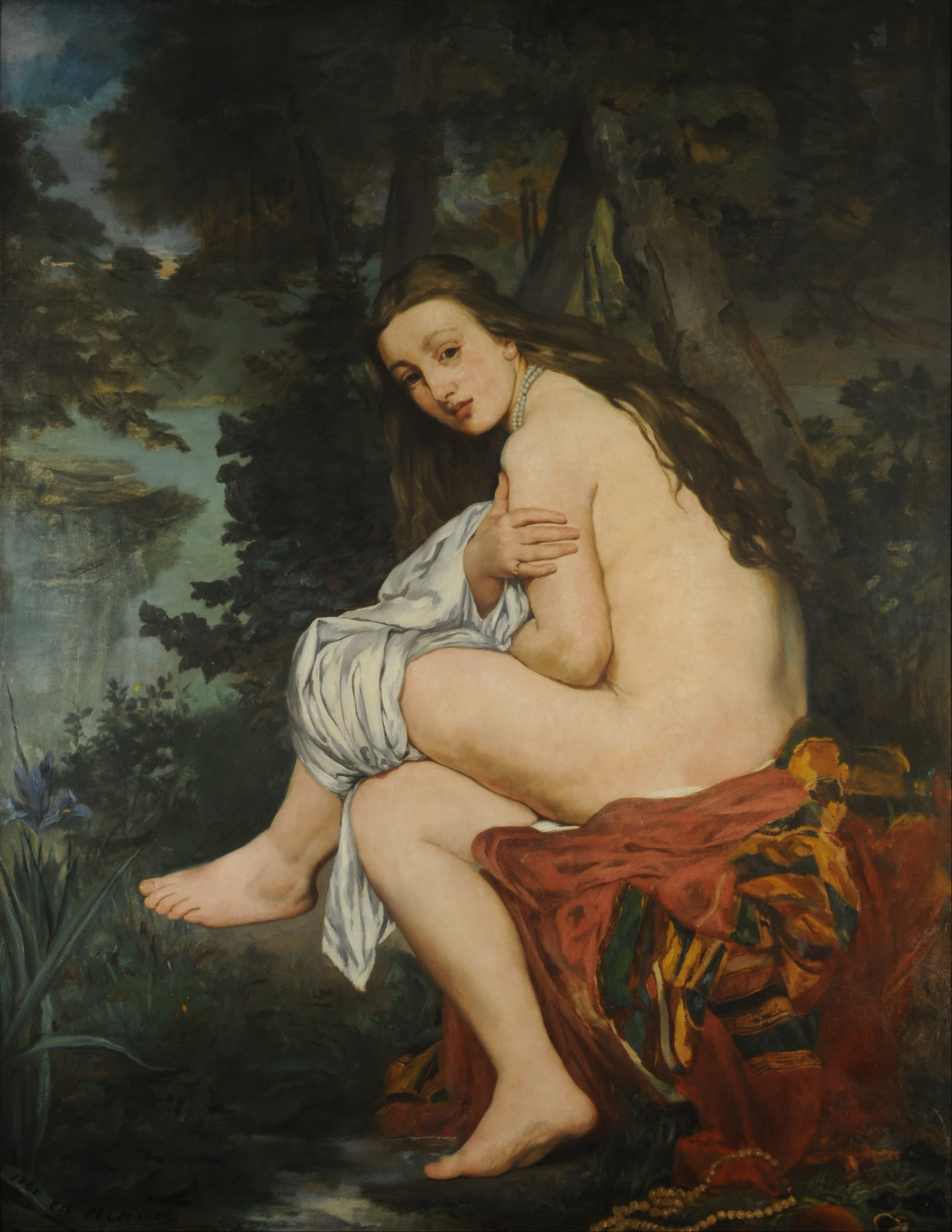
The surprised nymph, 1861, National Museum of Fine Arts Buenos Aires

The Old Musician, 1862, National Gallery of Art Washington

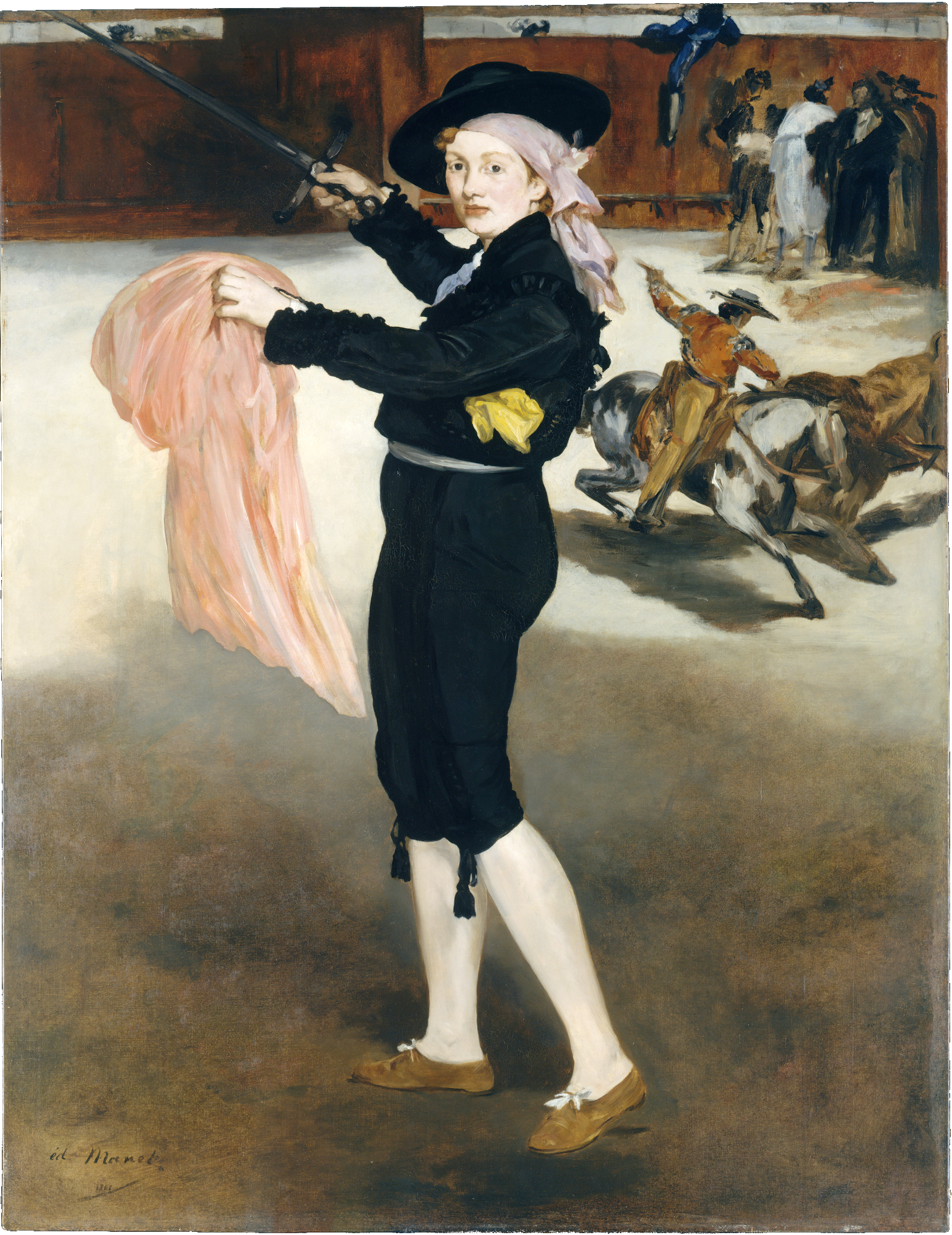
Mlle. Victorine in the Costume of a Matador, 1862, Metropolitan Museum of Art

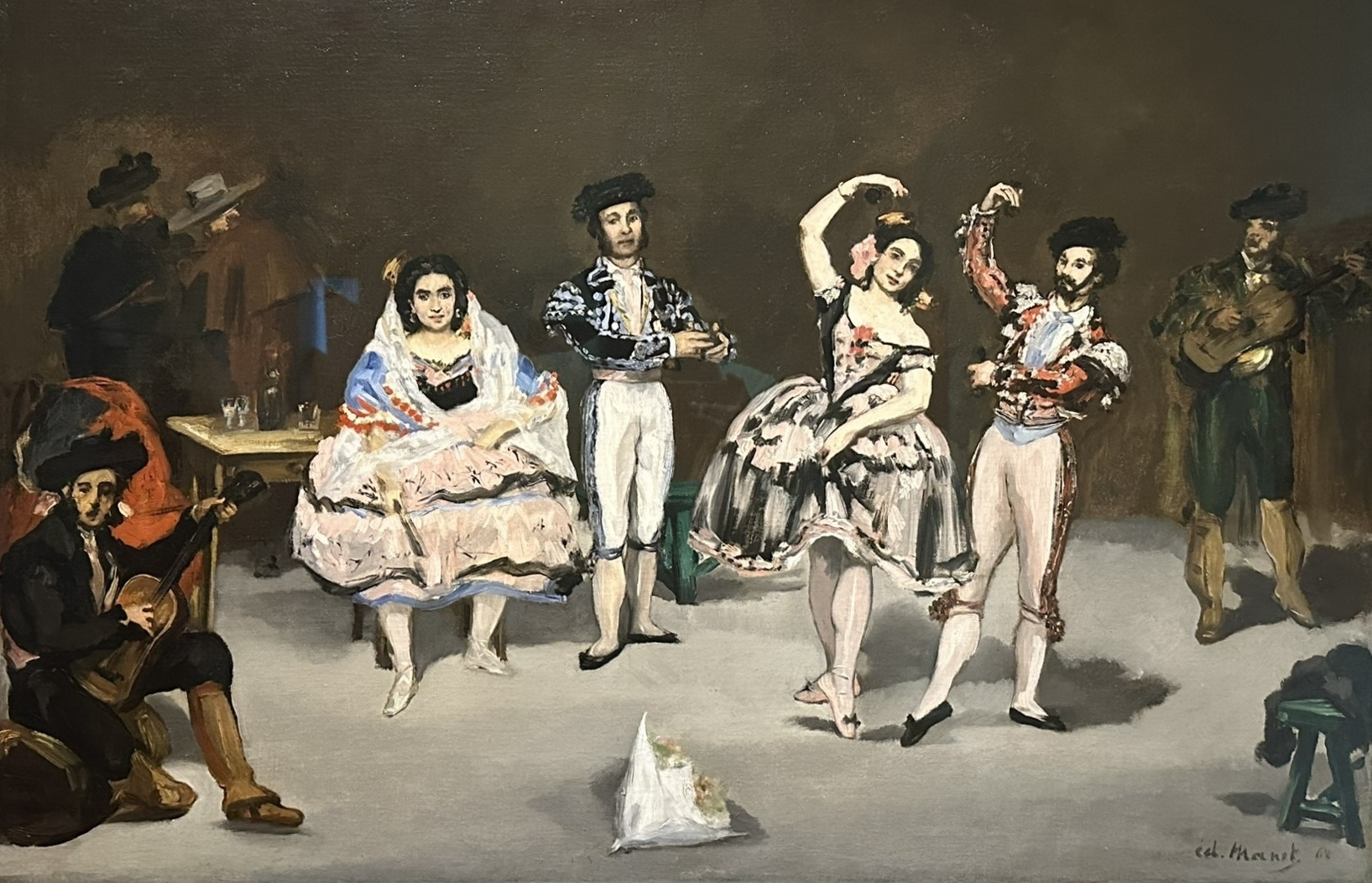
Spanish Ballet, 1864, The Phillips Collection

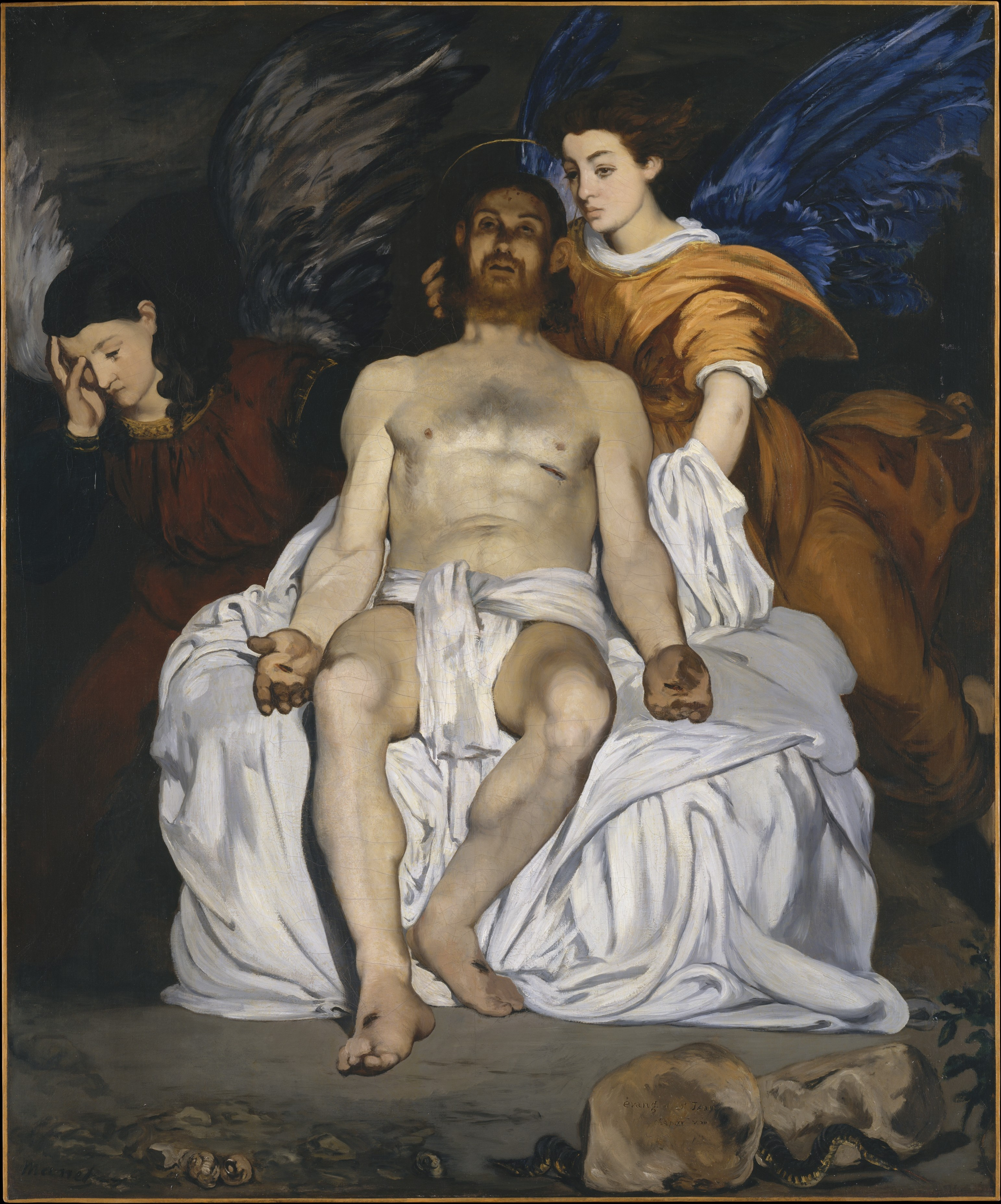
The Dead Christ with Angels, 1864, Metropolitan Museum of Art

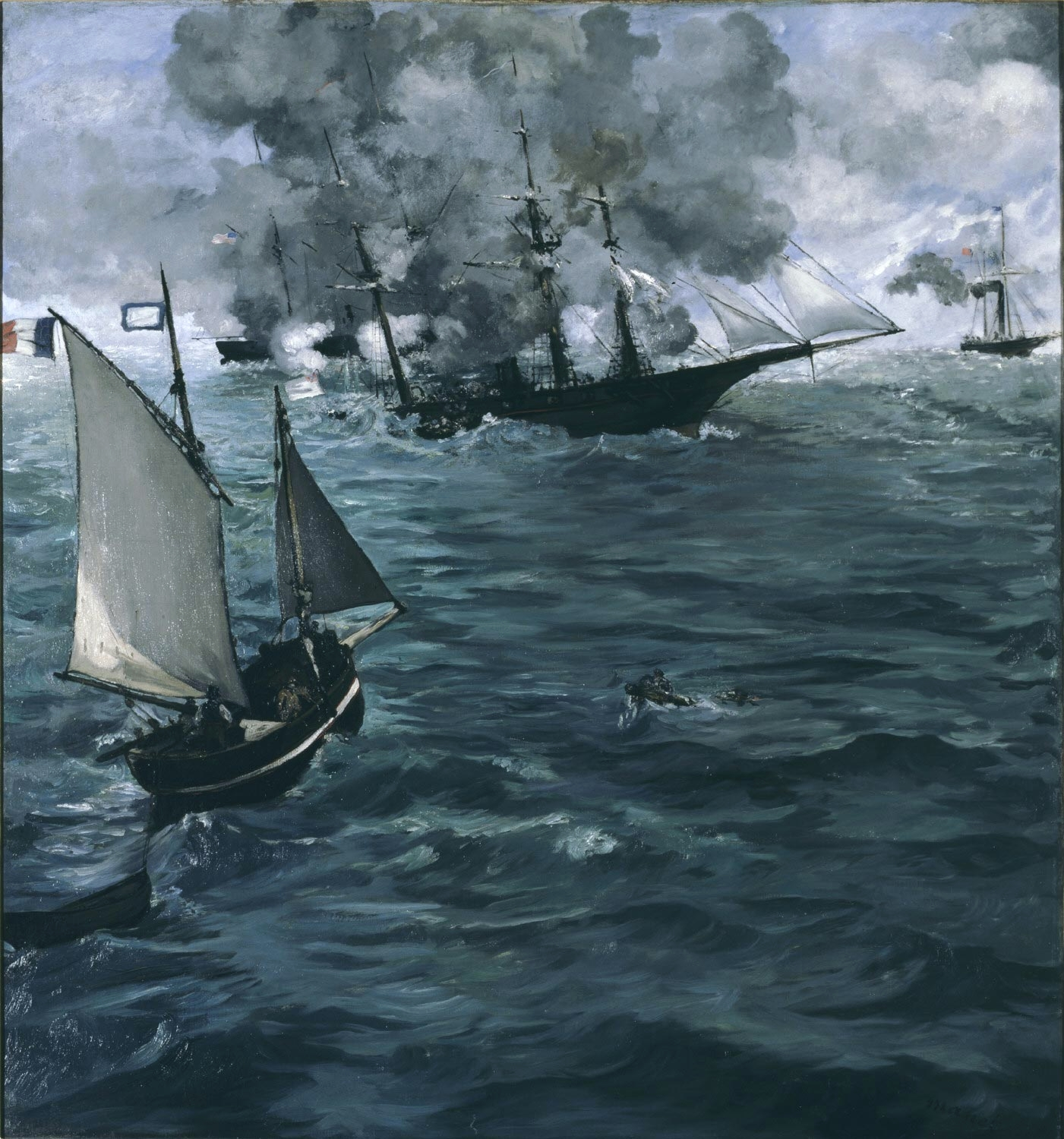
The Battle of the Kearsarge and the Alabama, 1864, Philadelphia Museum of Art. Inspired by the Battle of Cherbourg (1864)

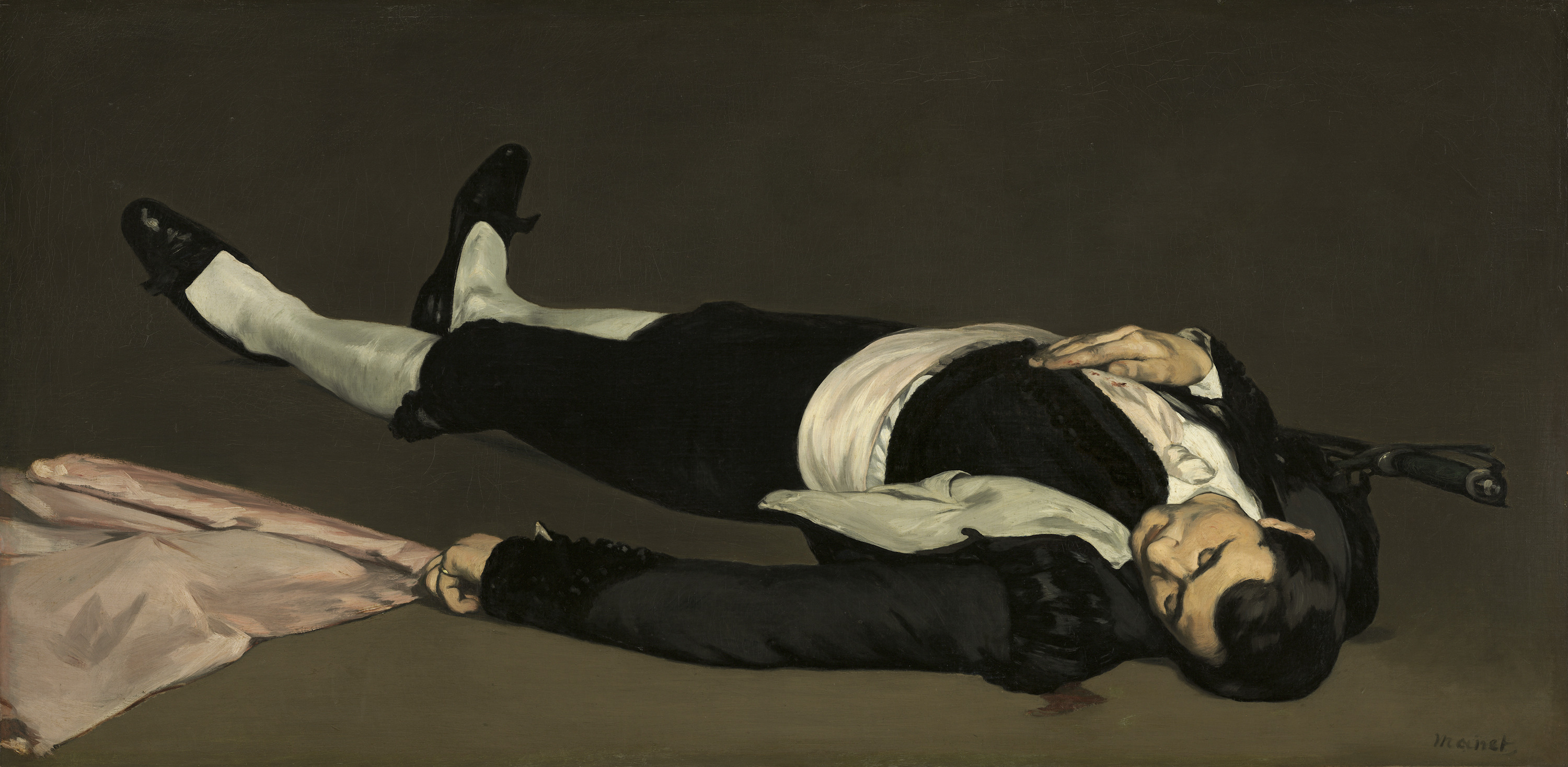
Dead Matador, 1864–65, National Gallery of Art Washington

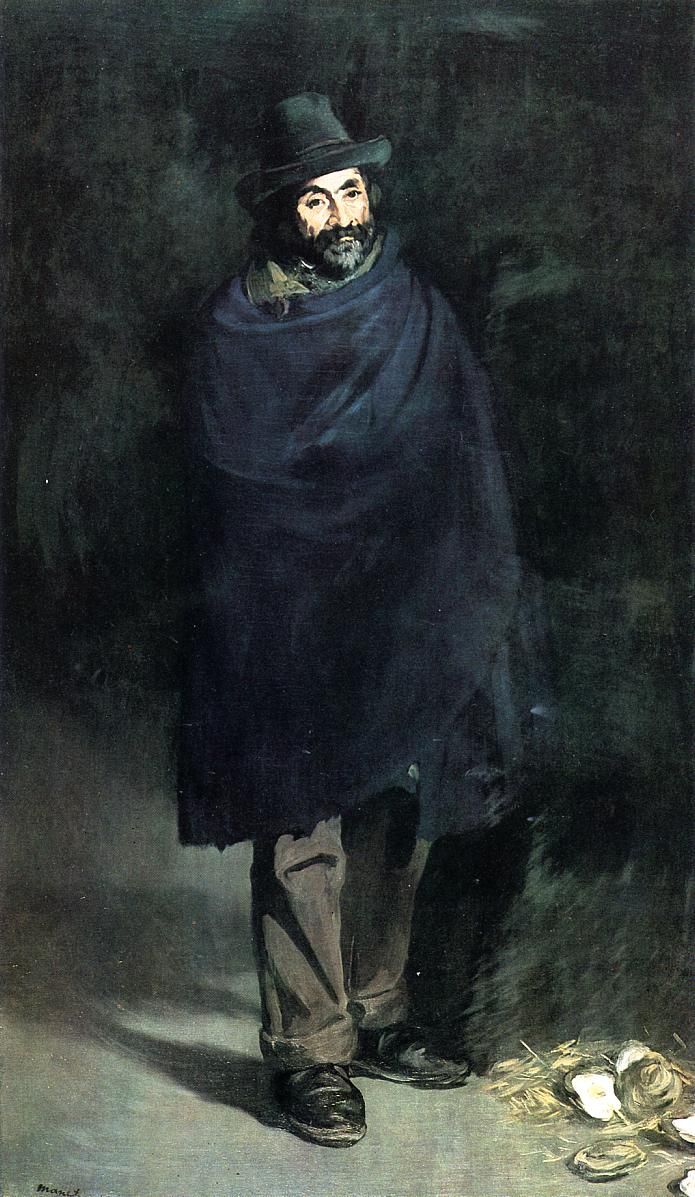
The Philosopher, (Beggar with Oysters), 1864–67, Art Institute of Chicago

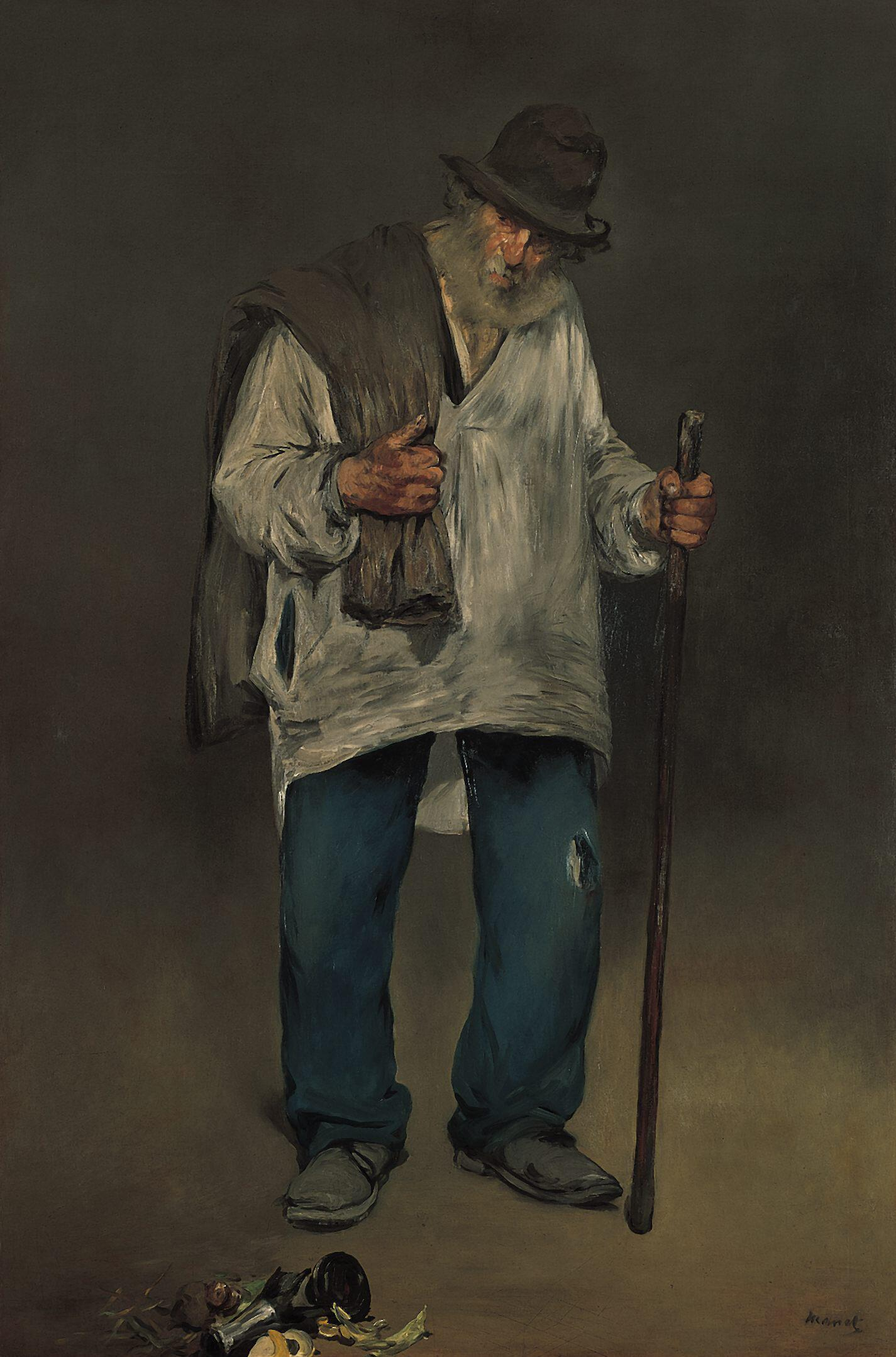
The Ragpicker, 1865–70, Norton Simon Museum

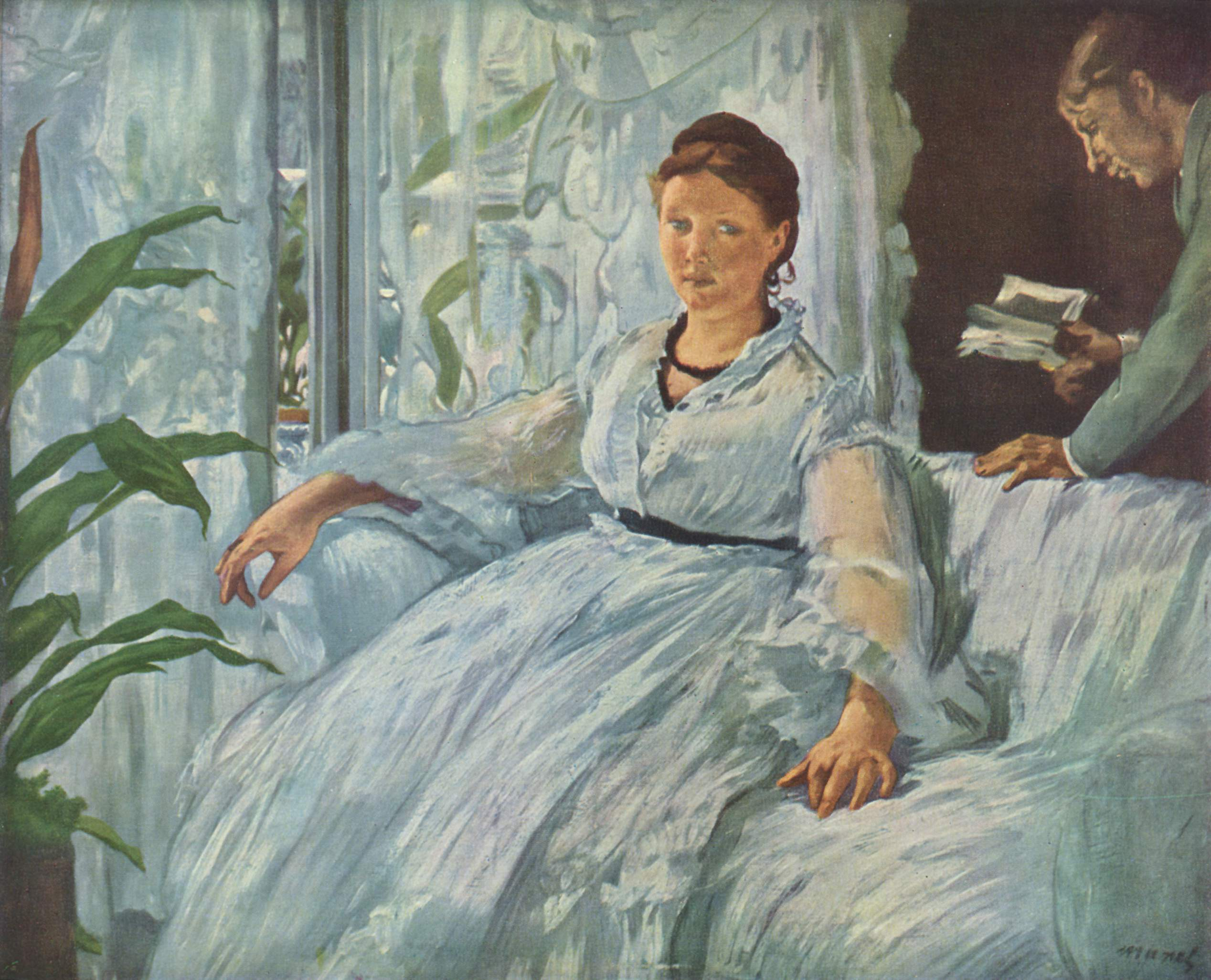
The Reading, 1865–1873, Musée d'Orsay

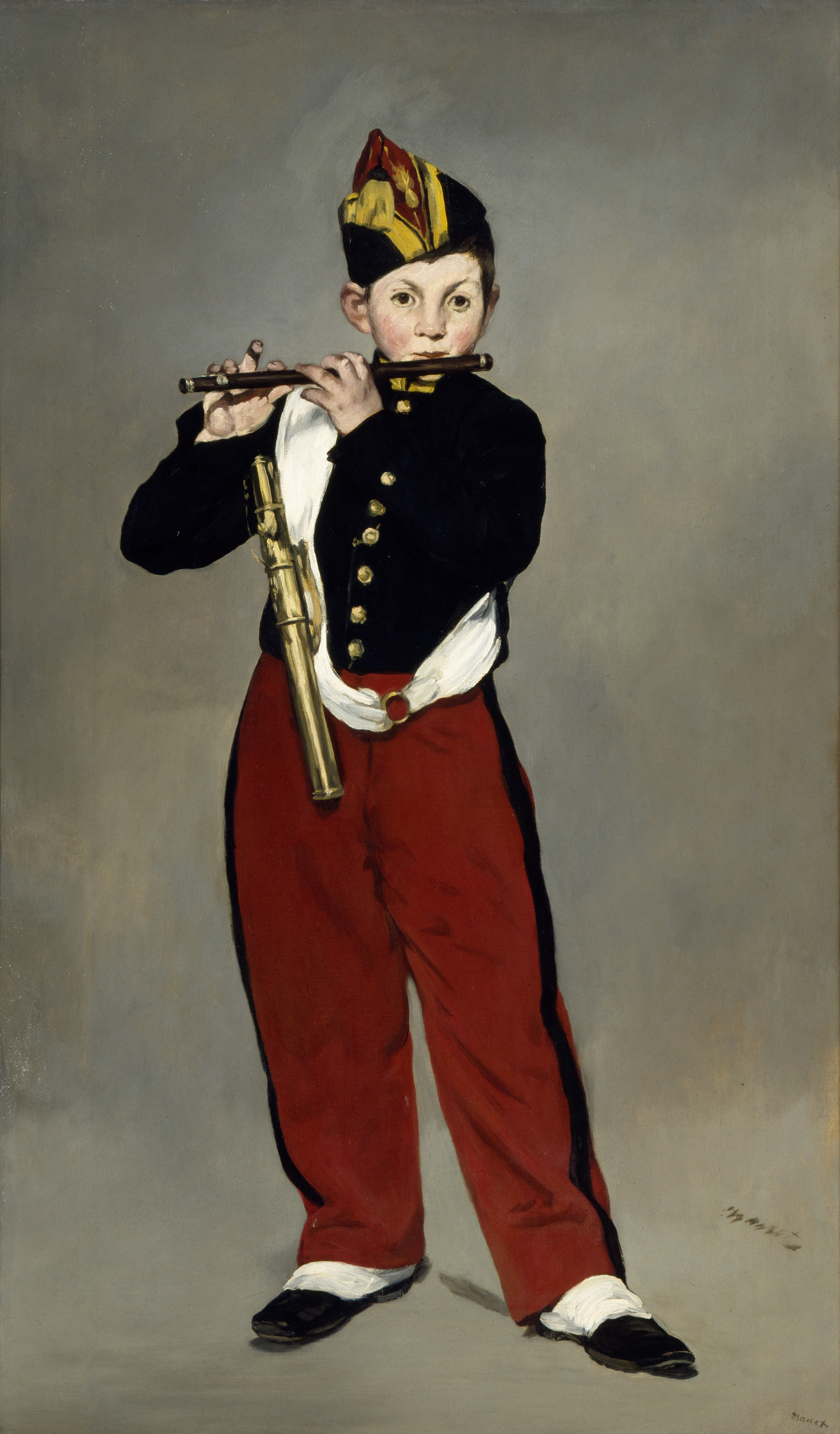
Young Flautist, or The Fifer, 1866, Musée d'Orsay

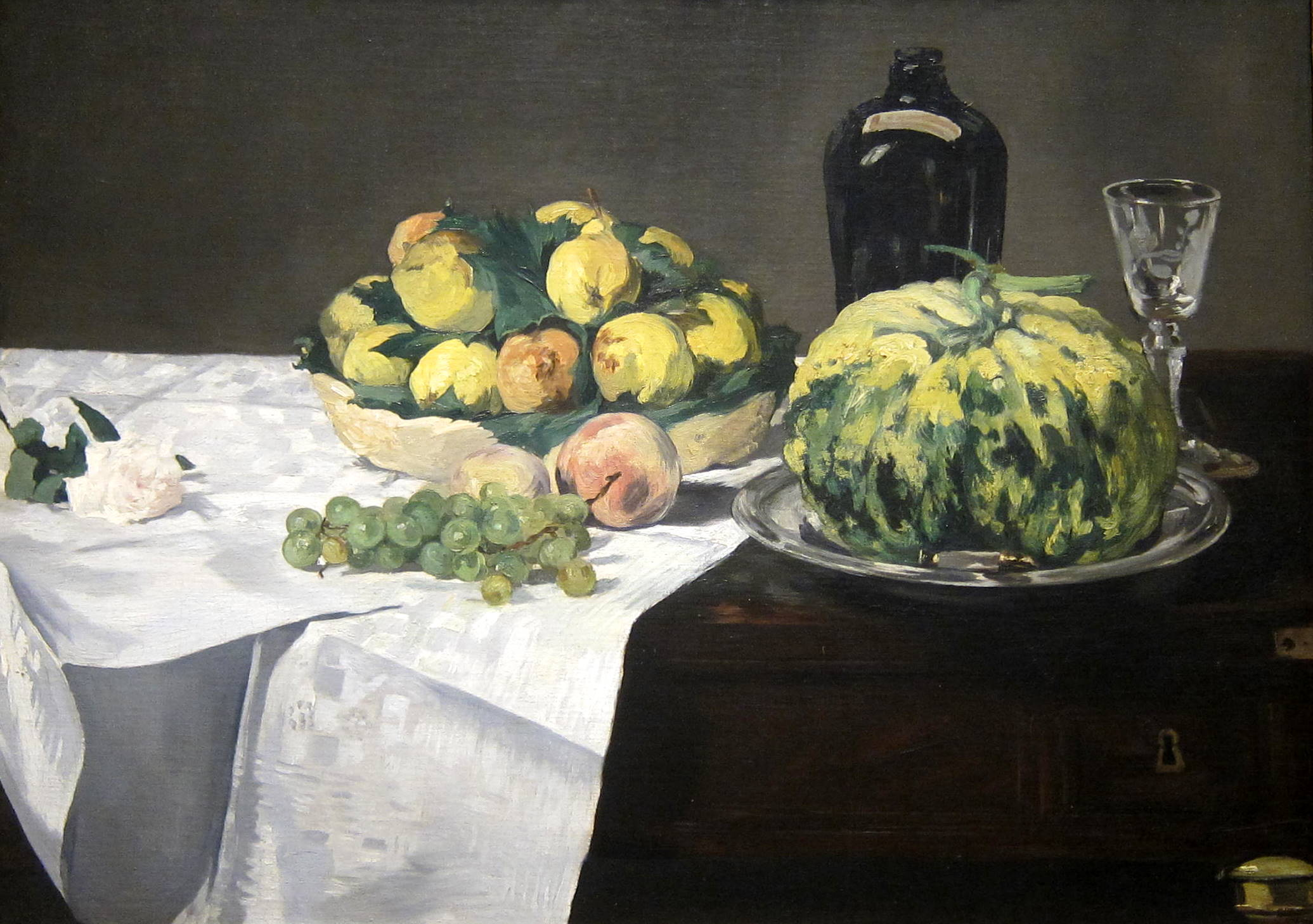
Still Life with Melon and Peaches, 1866, National Gallery of Art Washington

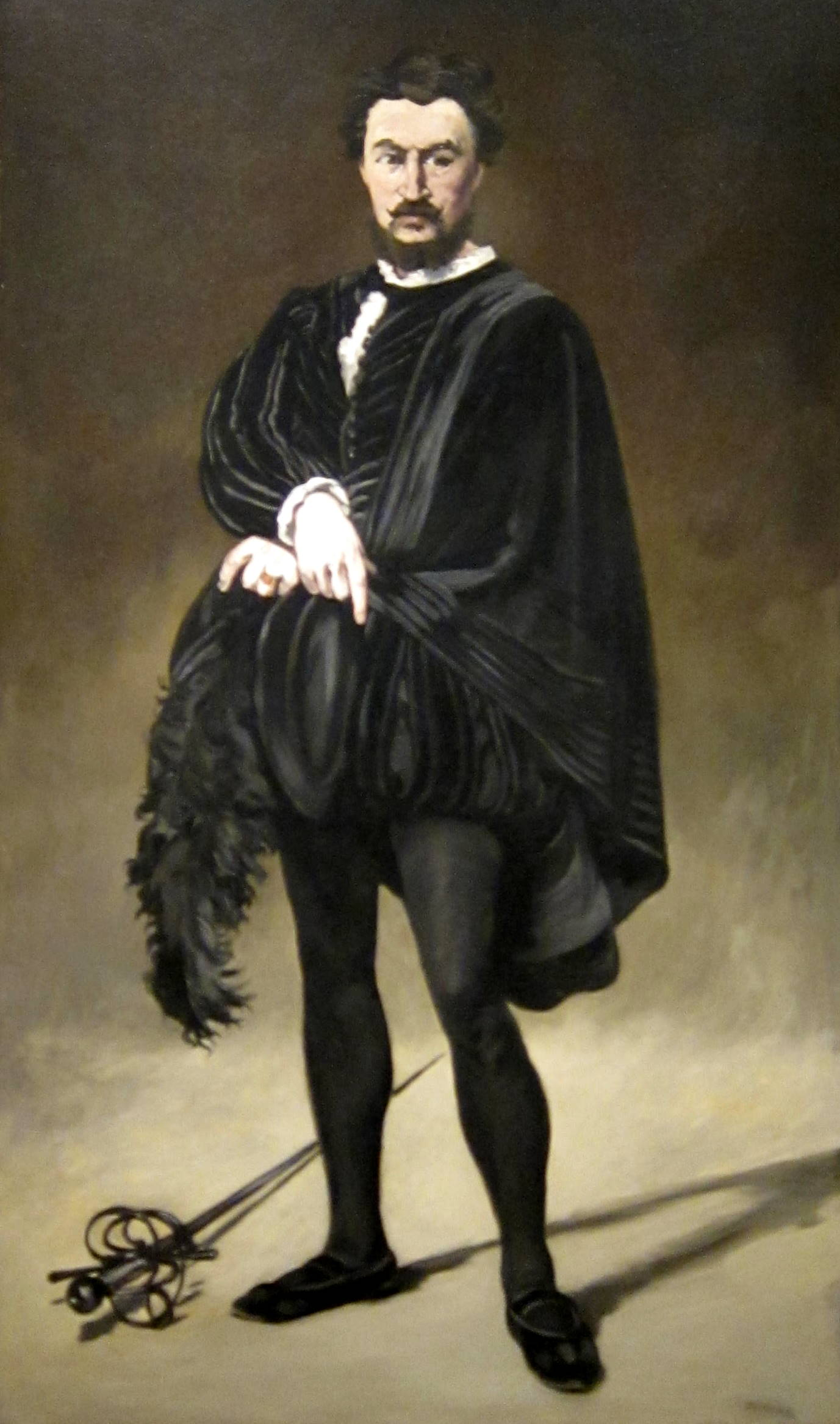
The Tragic Actor (Rouvière as Hamlet), 1866, National Gallery of Art Washington

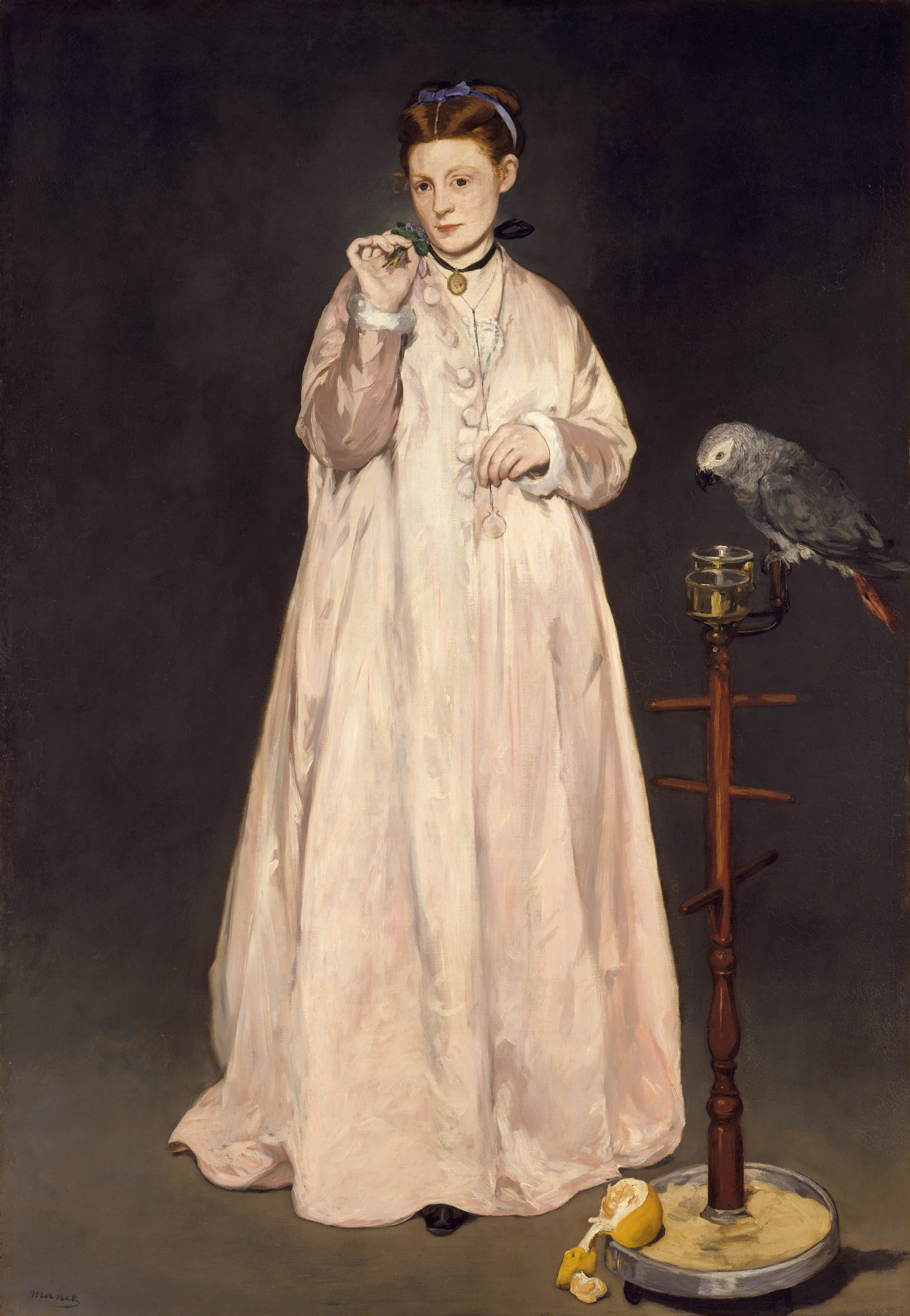
Woman with Parrot, 1866, Metropolitan Museum of Art

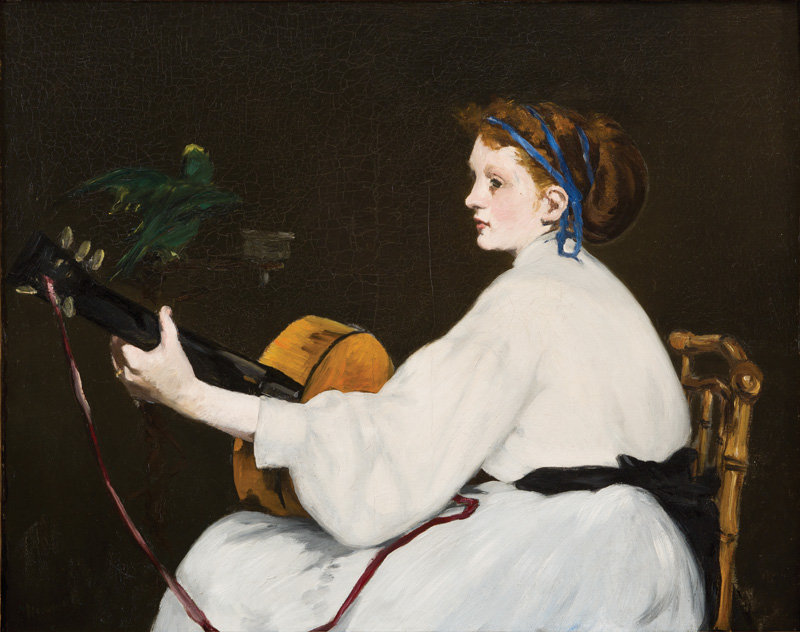
The Guitar Player, c. 1866, Hill-Stead Museum

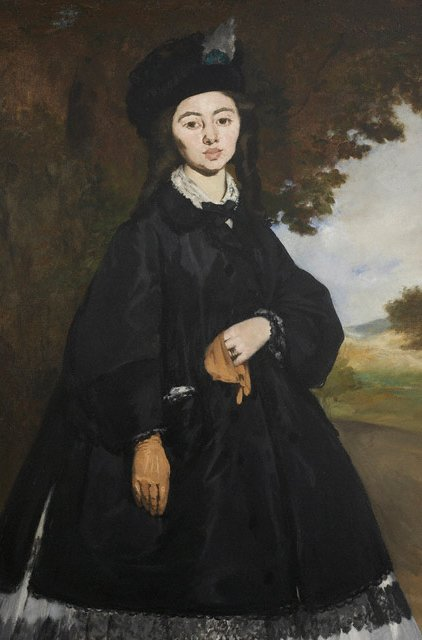
Portrait of Madame Brunet, 1867, J. Paul Getty Museum

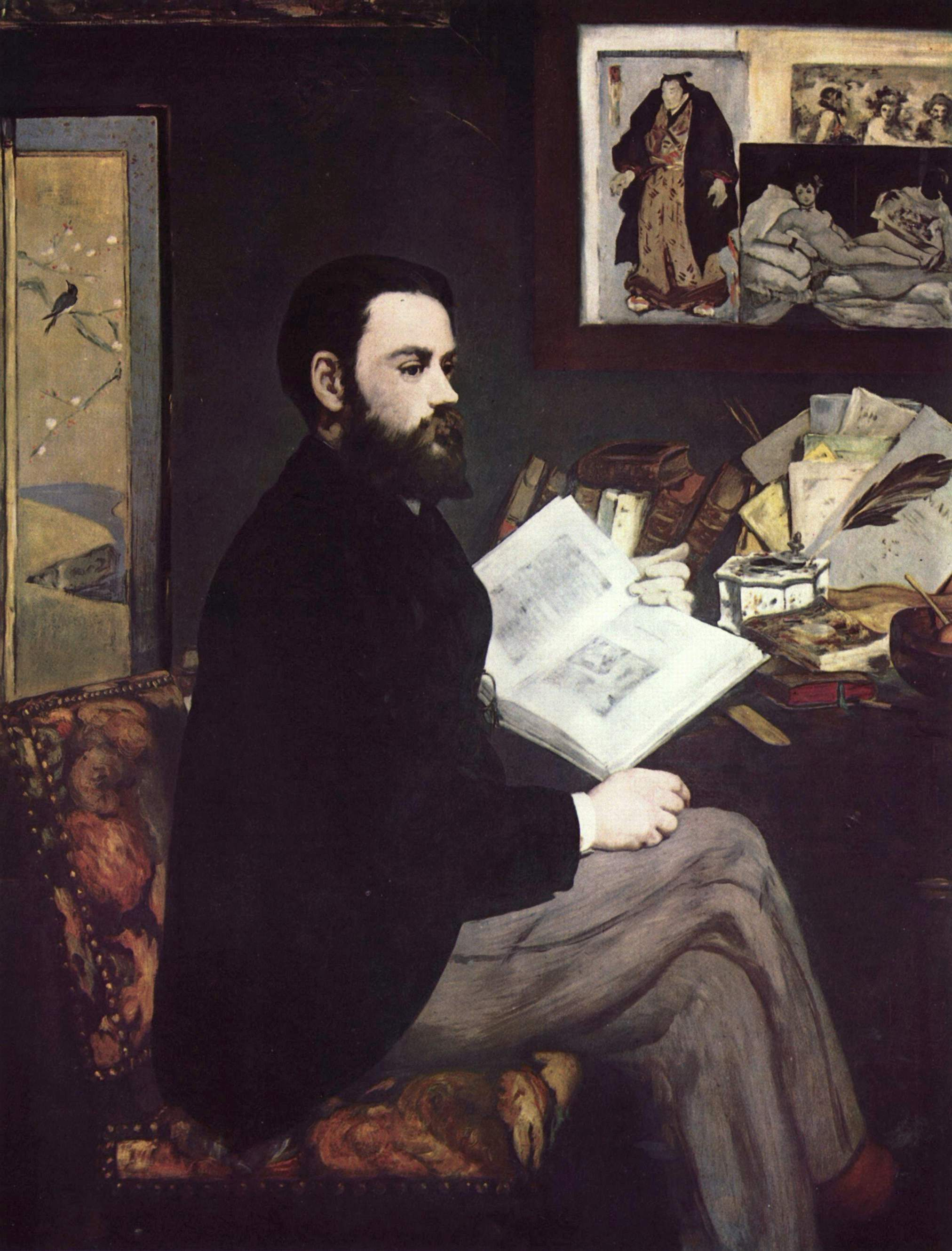
Portrait of Emile Zola, 1868, Musée d'Orsay

Breakfast in the Studio (the Black Jacket), 1868, Neue Pinakothek

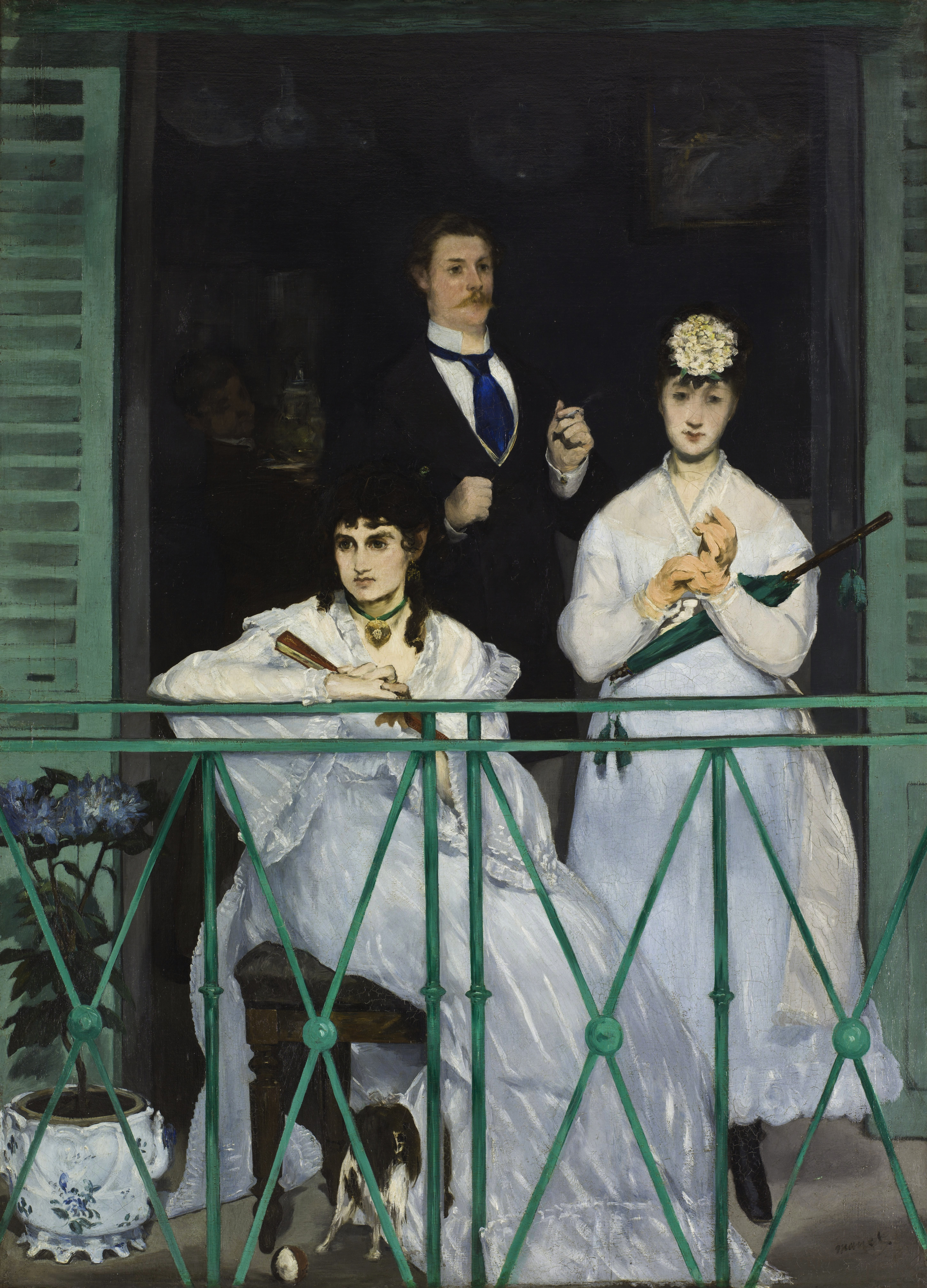
The Balcony, 1868–69, Musée d'Orsay

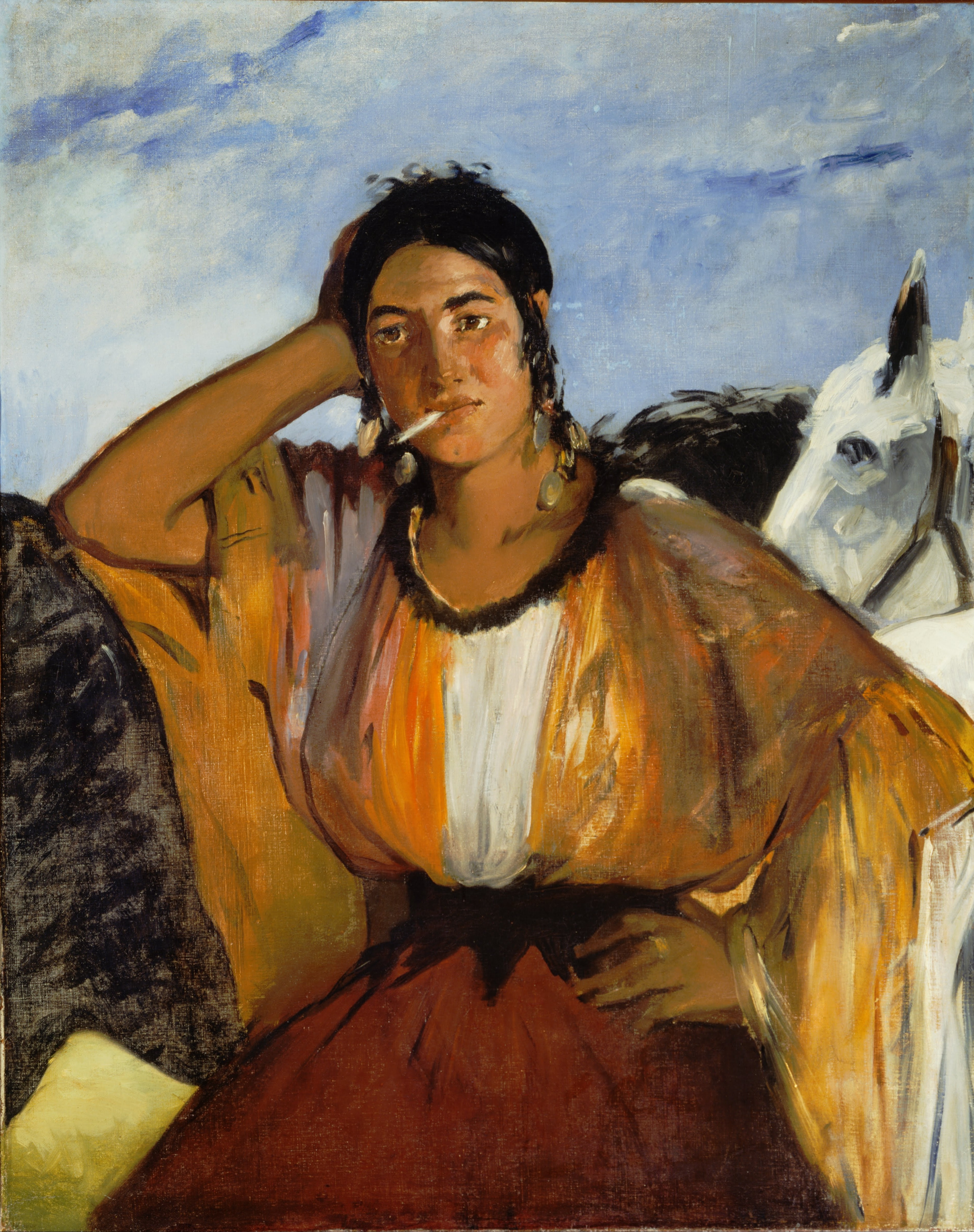
Gypsy with a Cigarette, c. 1860s–1870s, Princeton University Art Museum

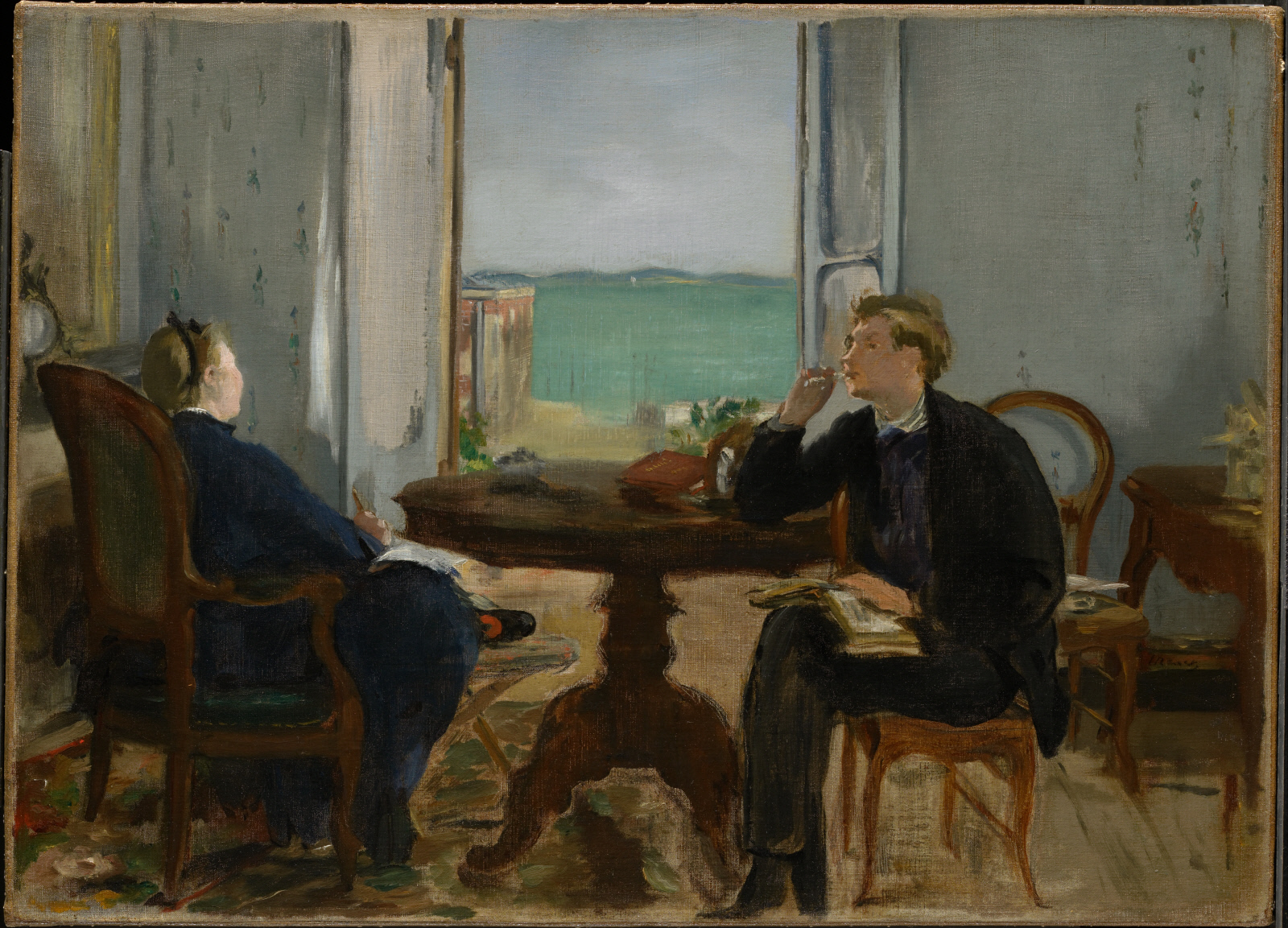
Interior at Arcachon, c. 1871, Clark Art Institute

Masked Ball at the Opera House, 1873, National Gallery of Art Washington

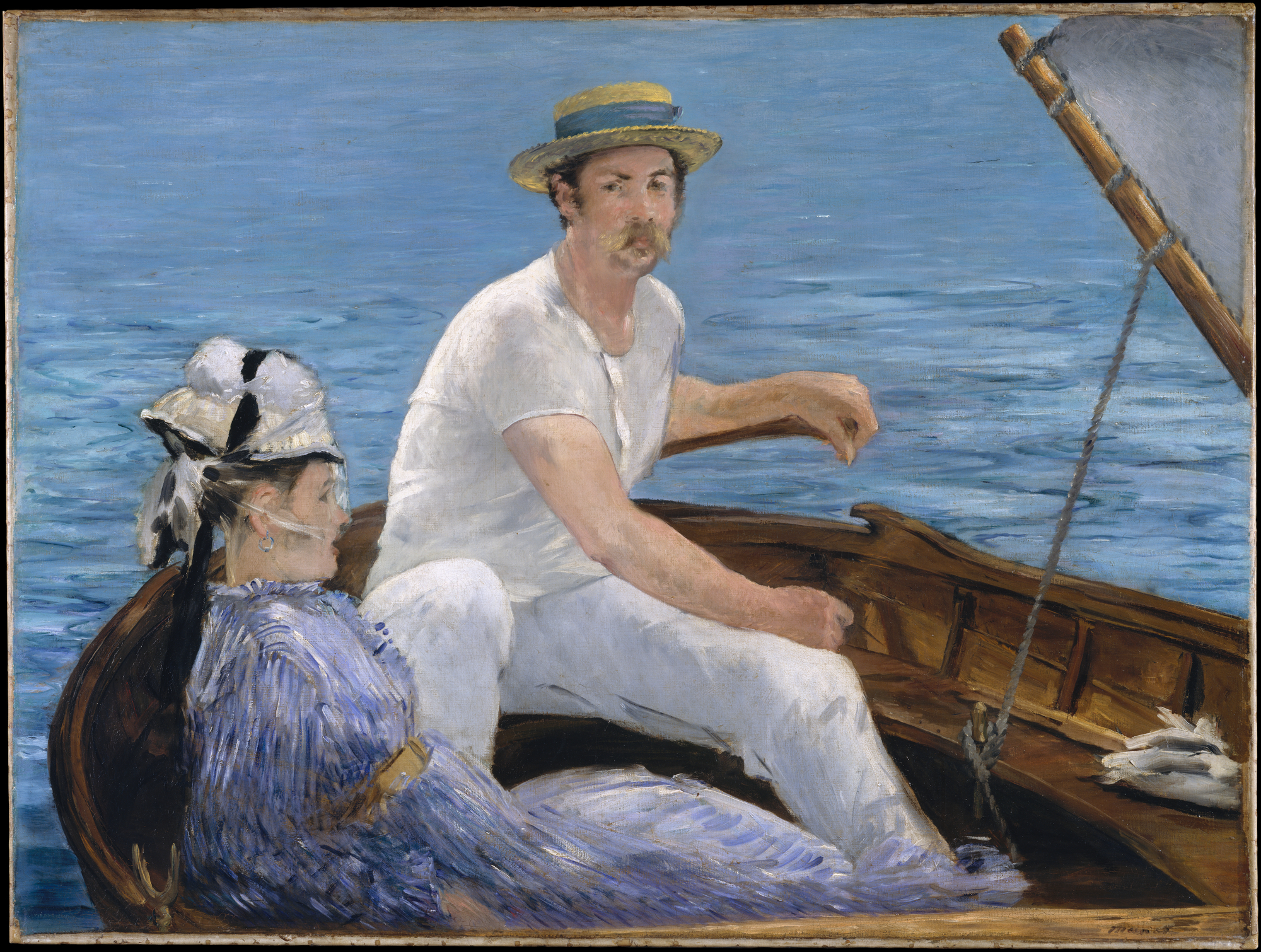
Boating, 1874, Metropolitan Museum of Art

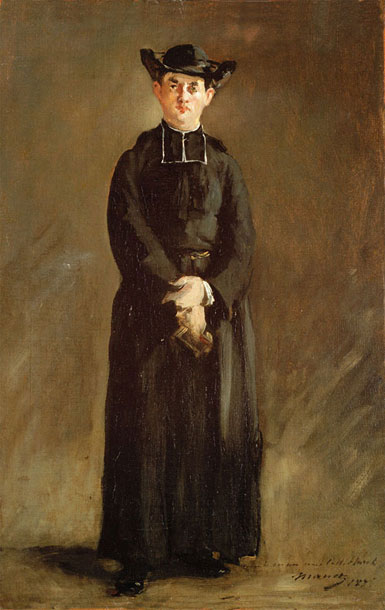
Portrait of Abbé Hurel, 1874, National Museum of Decorative Arts Buenos Aires

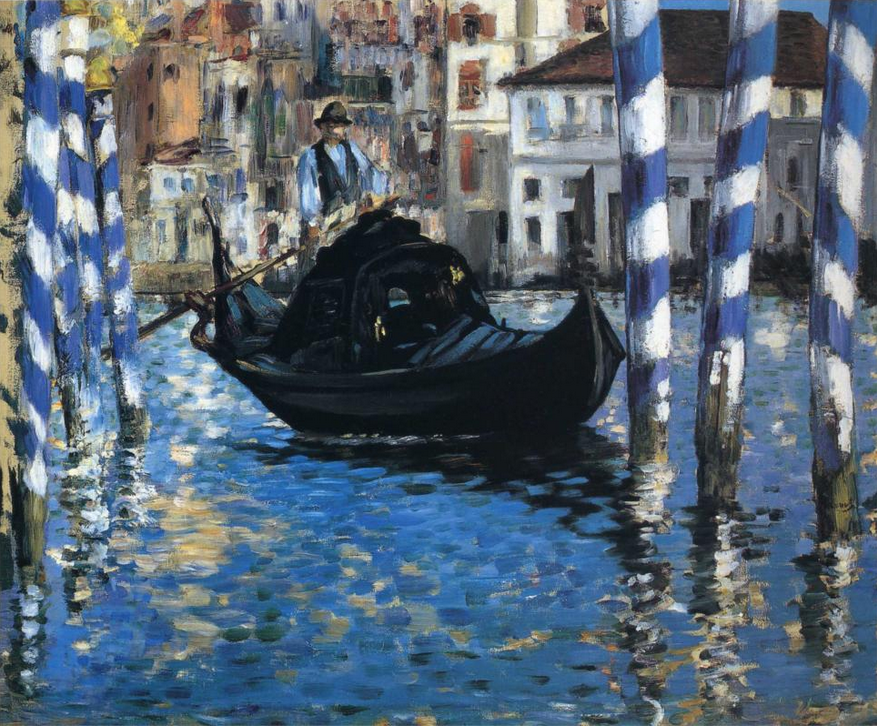
The grand canal of Venice (Blue Venice), 1875, Shelburne Museum

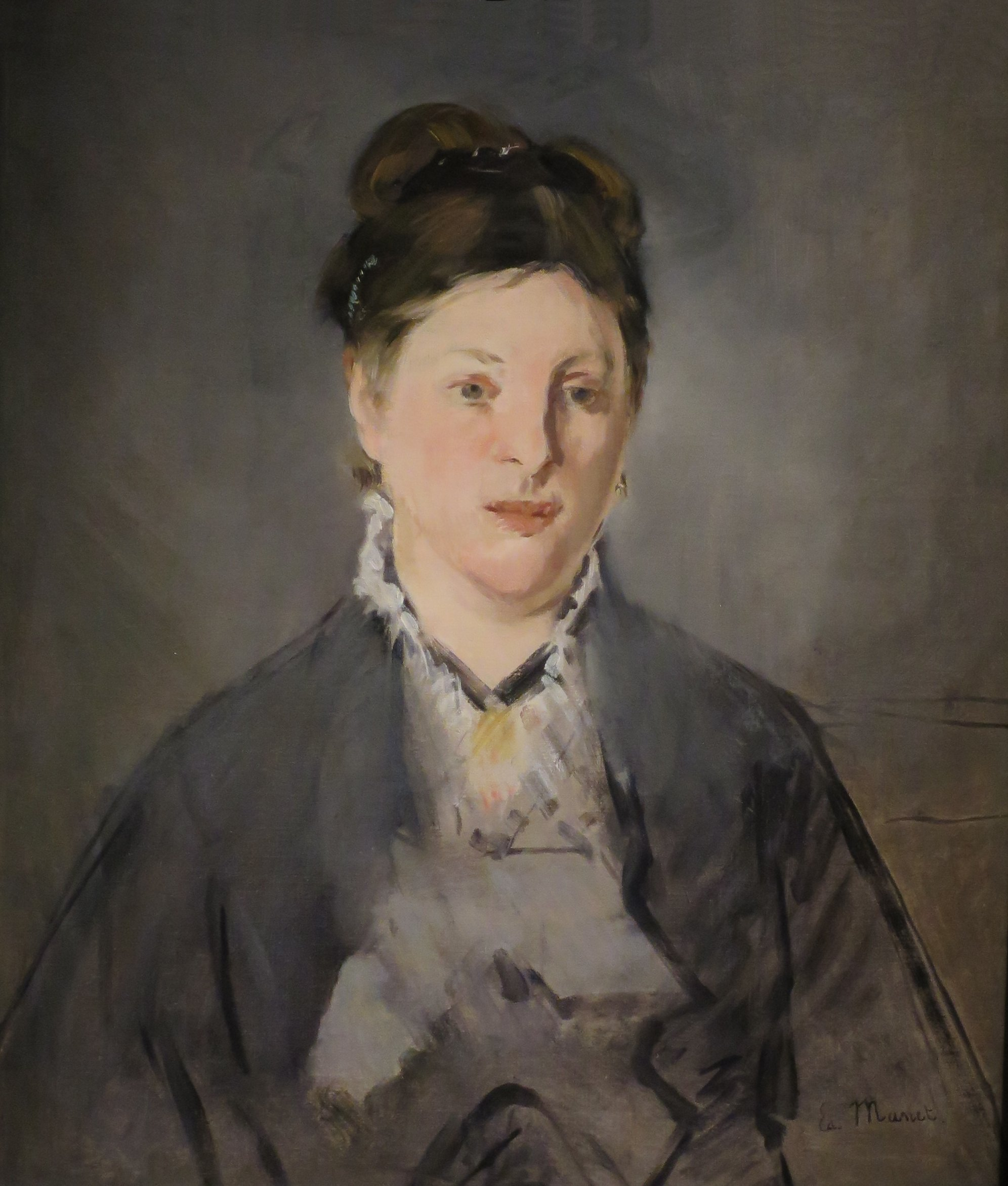
Madame Manet, c. 1874–76, Norton Simon Museum

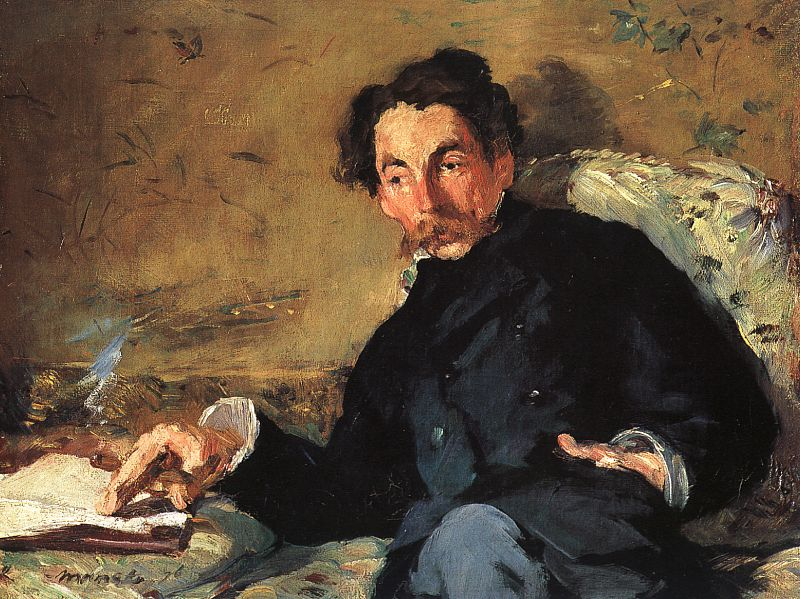
Portrait of Stéphane Mallarmé, 1876, Musée d'Orsay

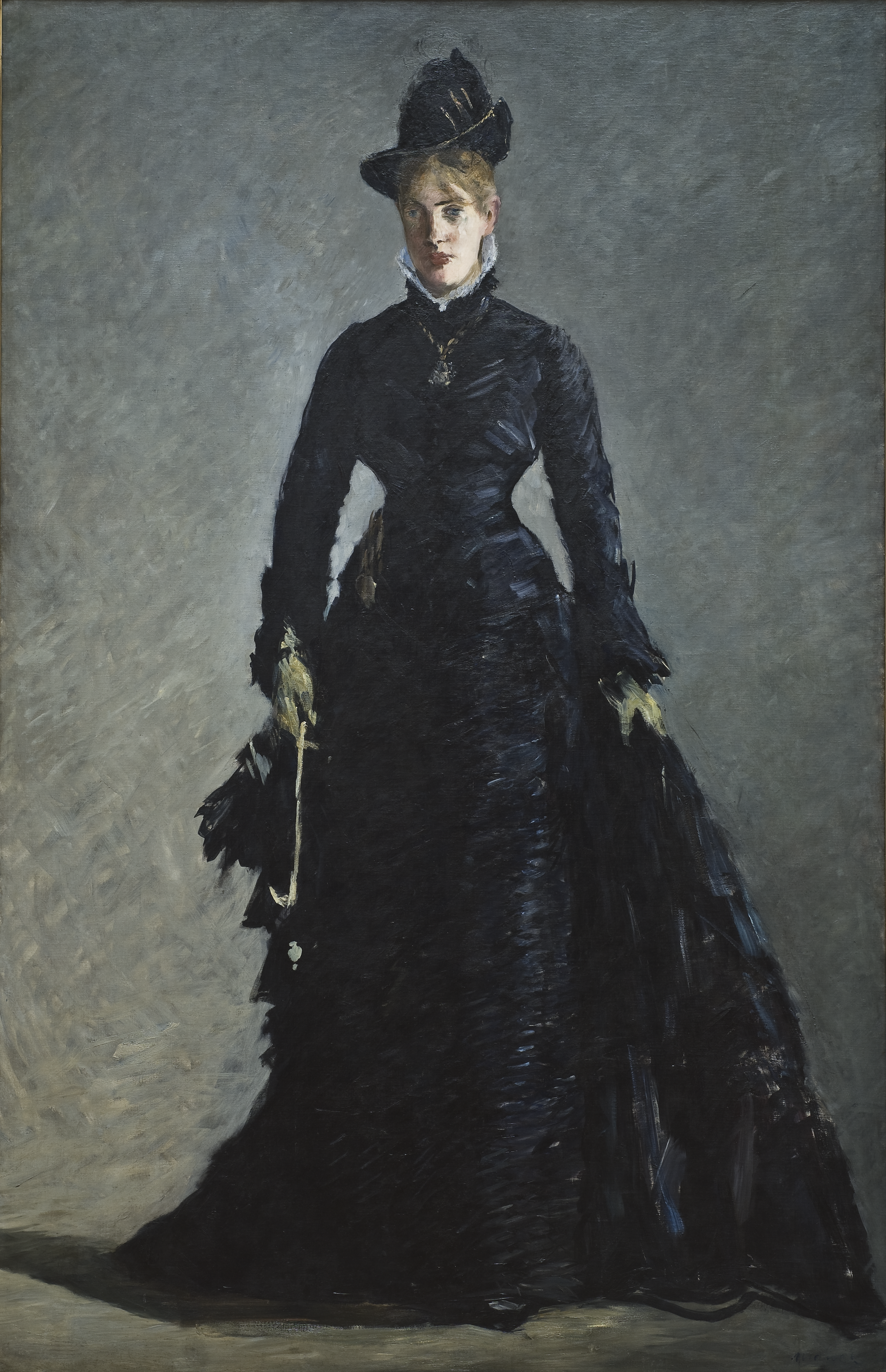
A Parisian Lady, ca. 1876, Nationalmuseum Stockholm

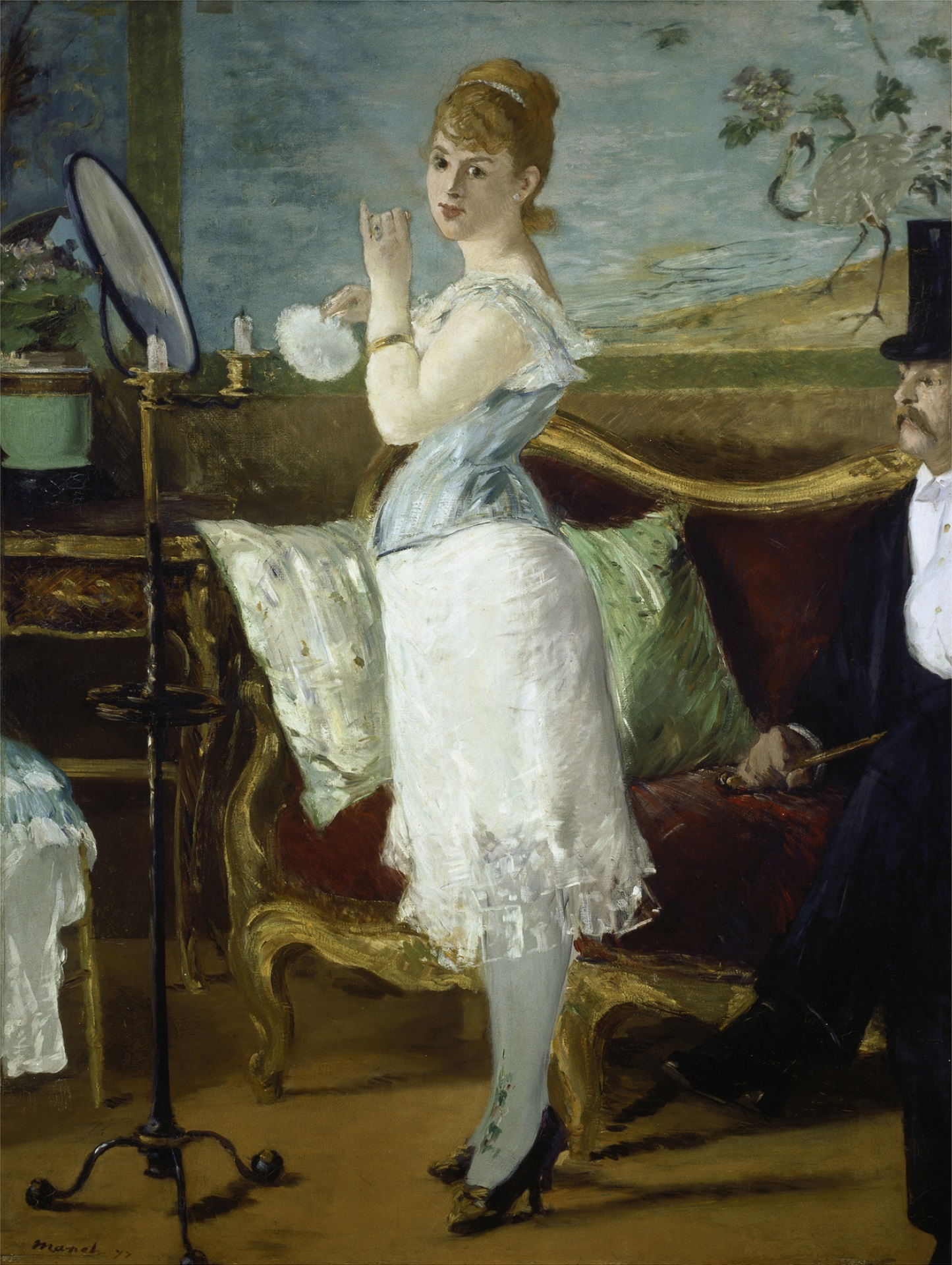
Nana, 1877, Hamburger Kunsthalle

The Rue Mosnier Dressed with Flags, 1878, J. Paul Getty Museum

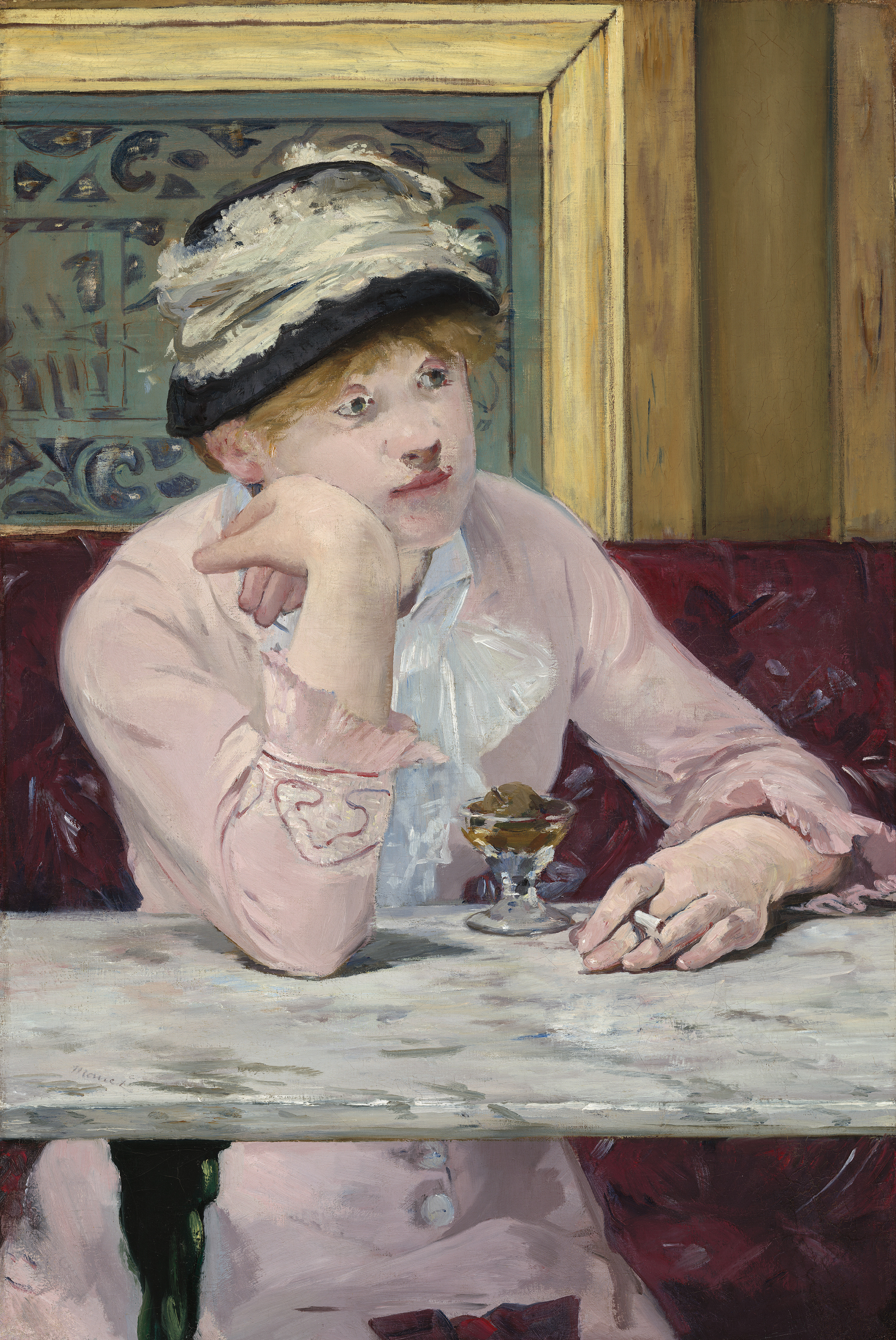
The Plum, 1878, National Gallery of Art Washington

At the café, 1878, Sammlung Oskar Reinhart 'Am Römerholz', Winterthur

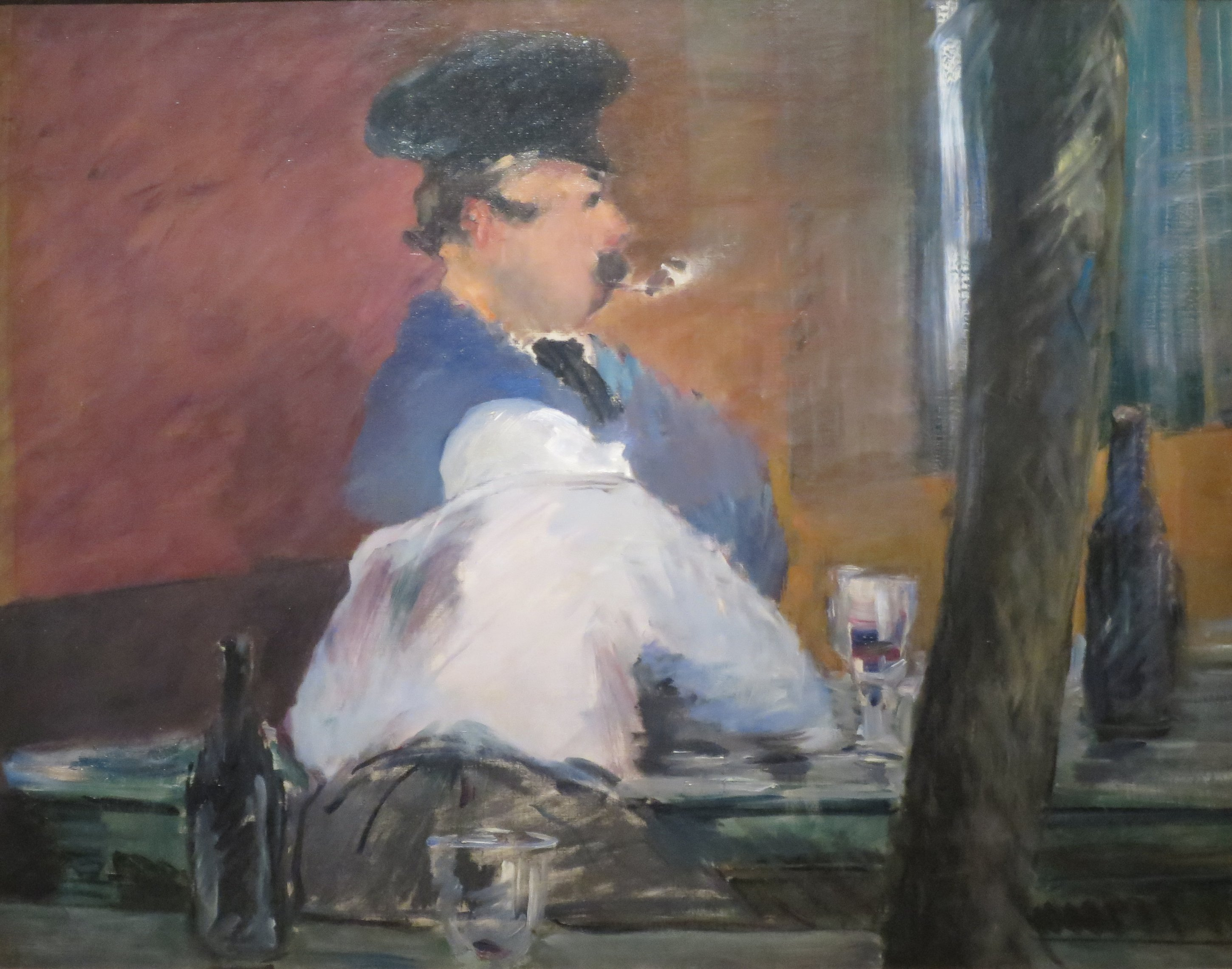
The bar, 1878–79, Pushkin Museum

In the Conservatory, 1879, Alte Nationalgalerie

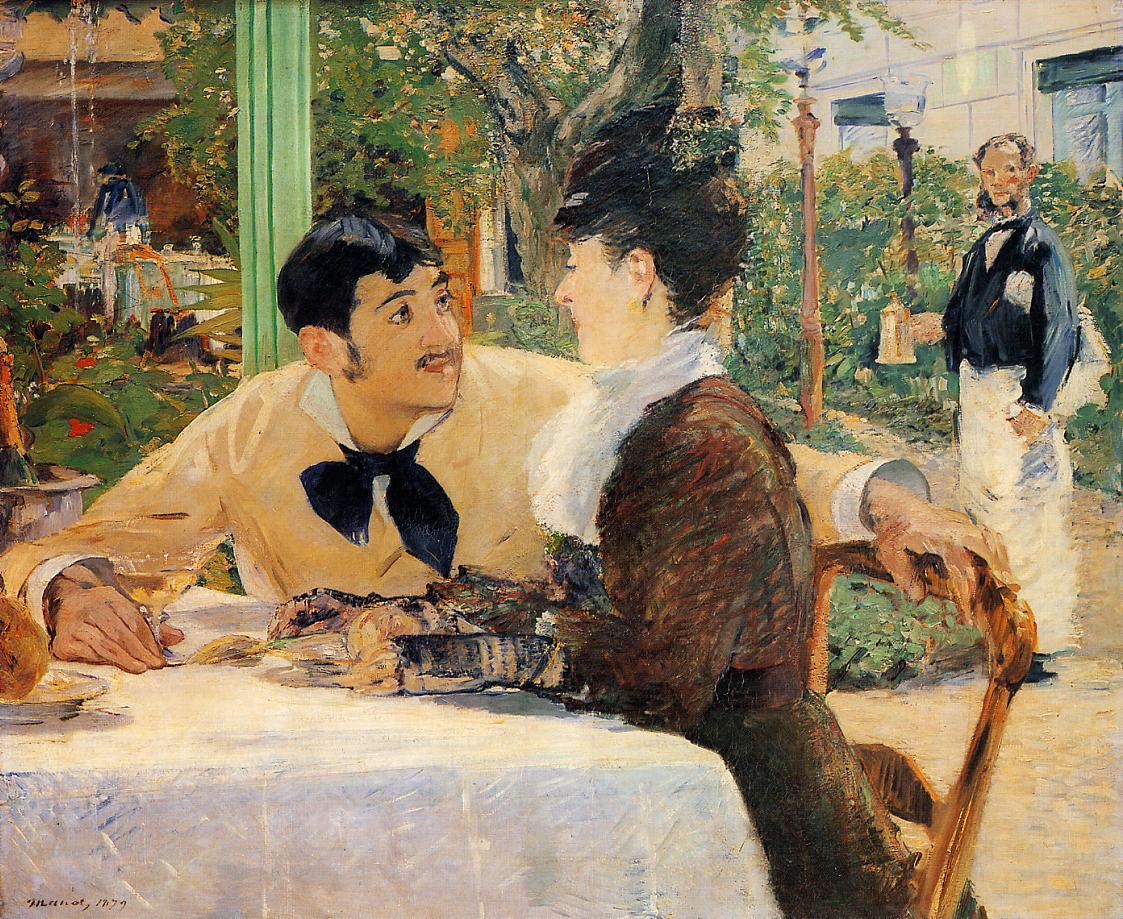
Chez le père Lathuille, 1879, Musée des Beaux-Arts Tournai

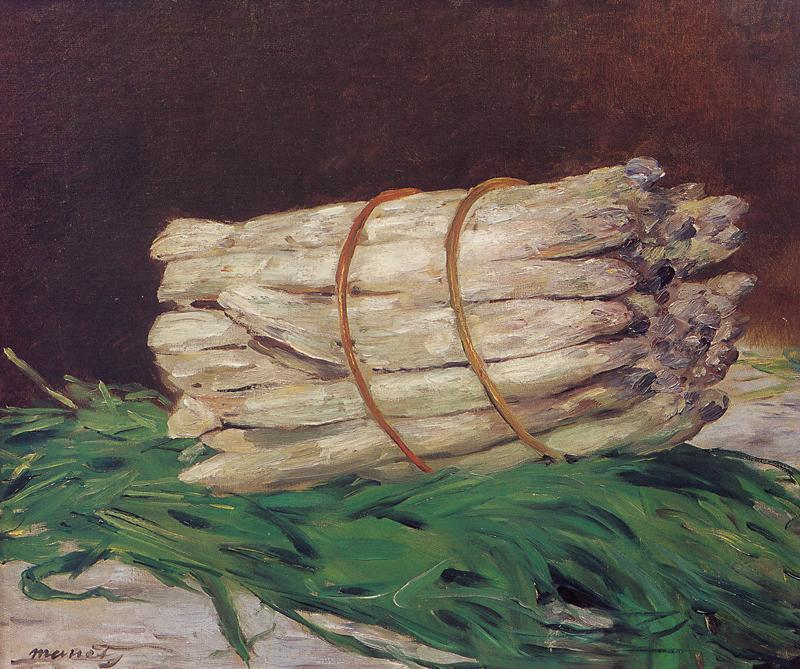
A Bundle of Asparagus, 1880, Wallraf–Richartz Museum

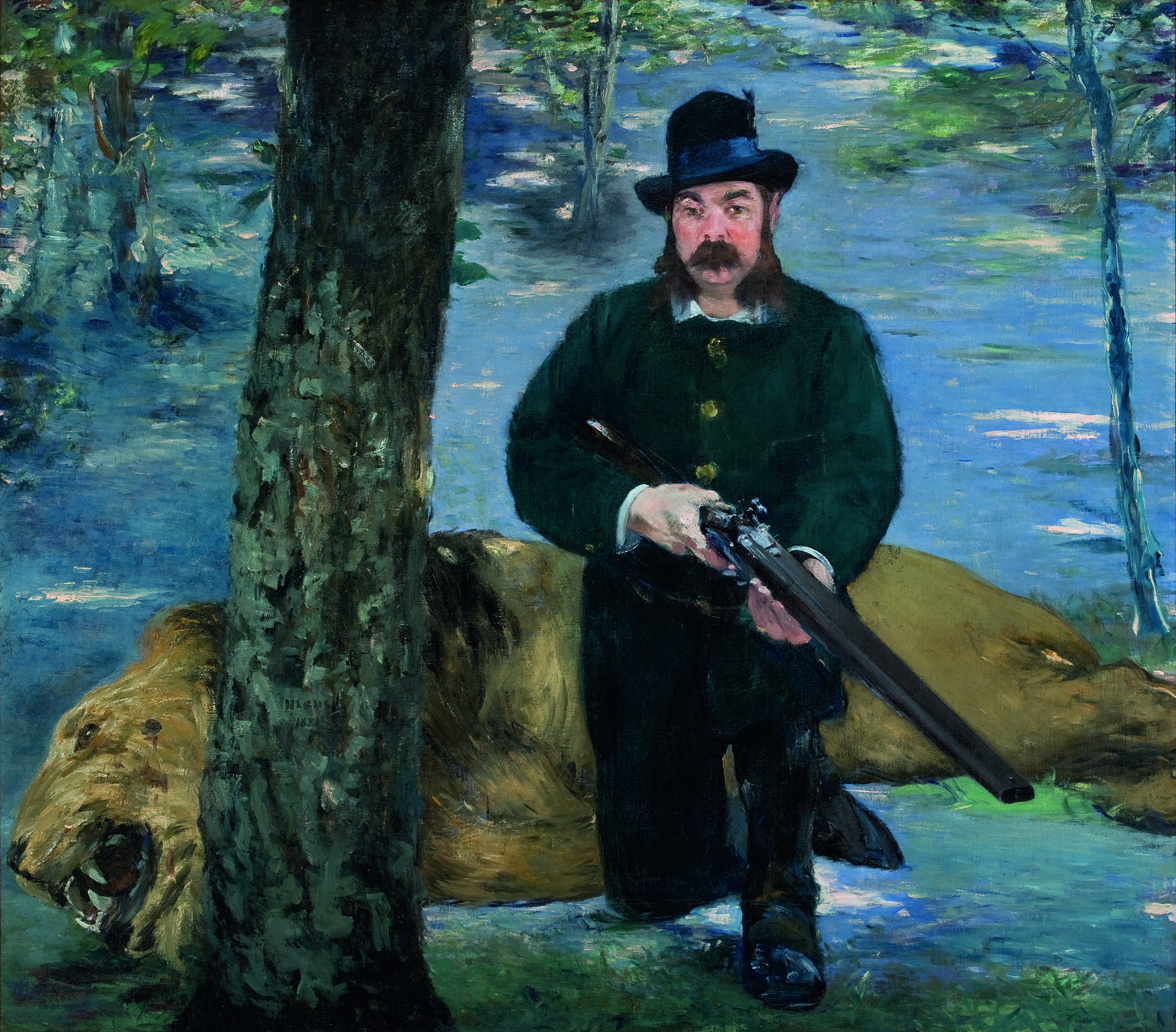
Pertuiset, the lion hunter, 1881, São Paulo Museum of Art

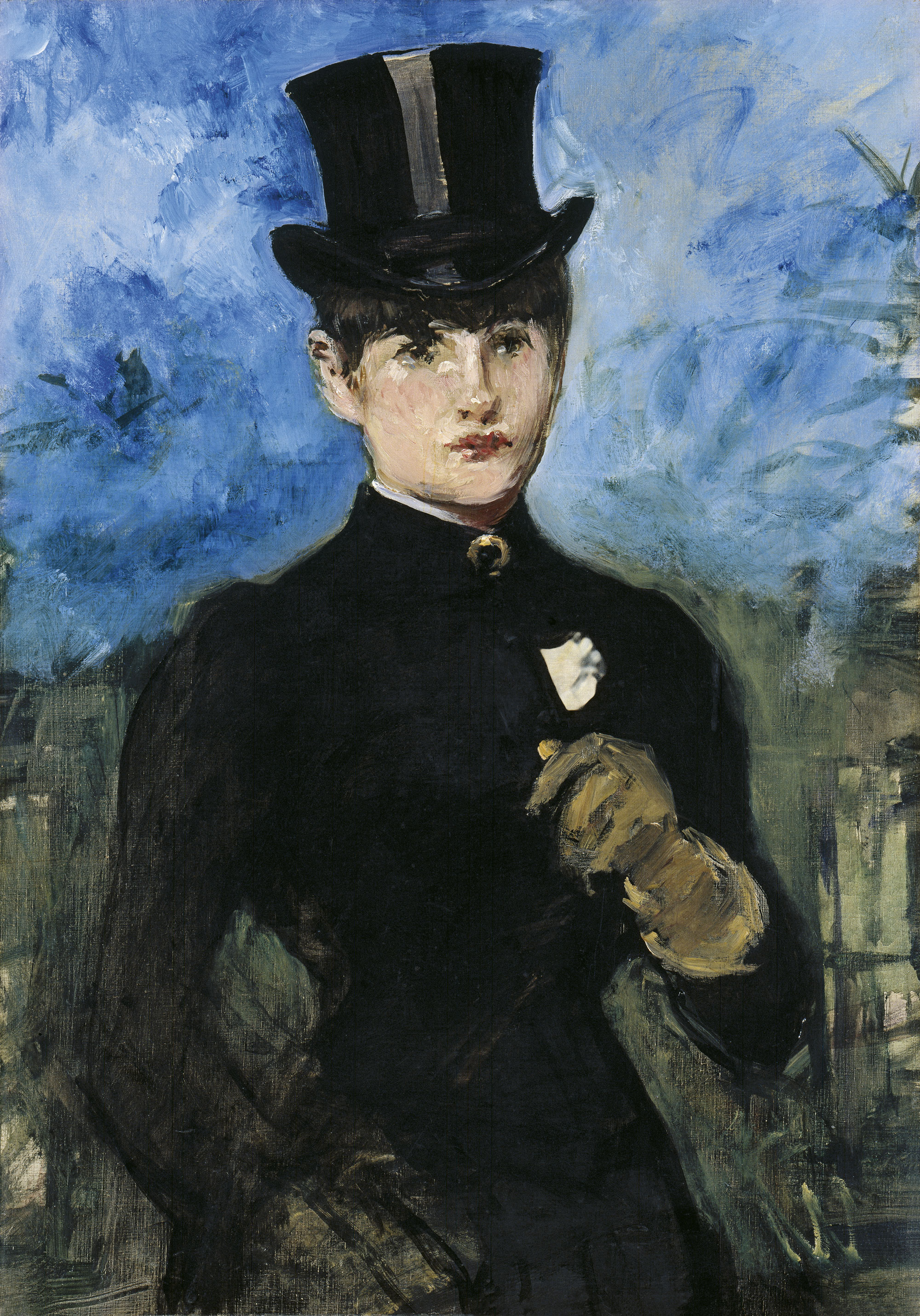
Horsewoman, c. 1882, Thyssen-Bornemisza Museum

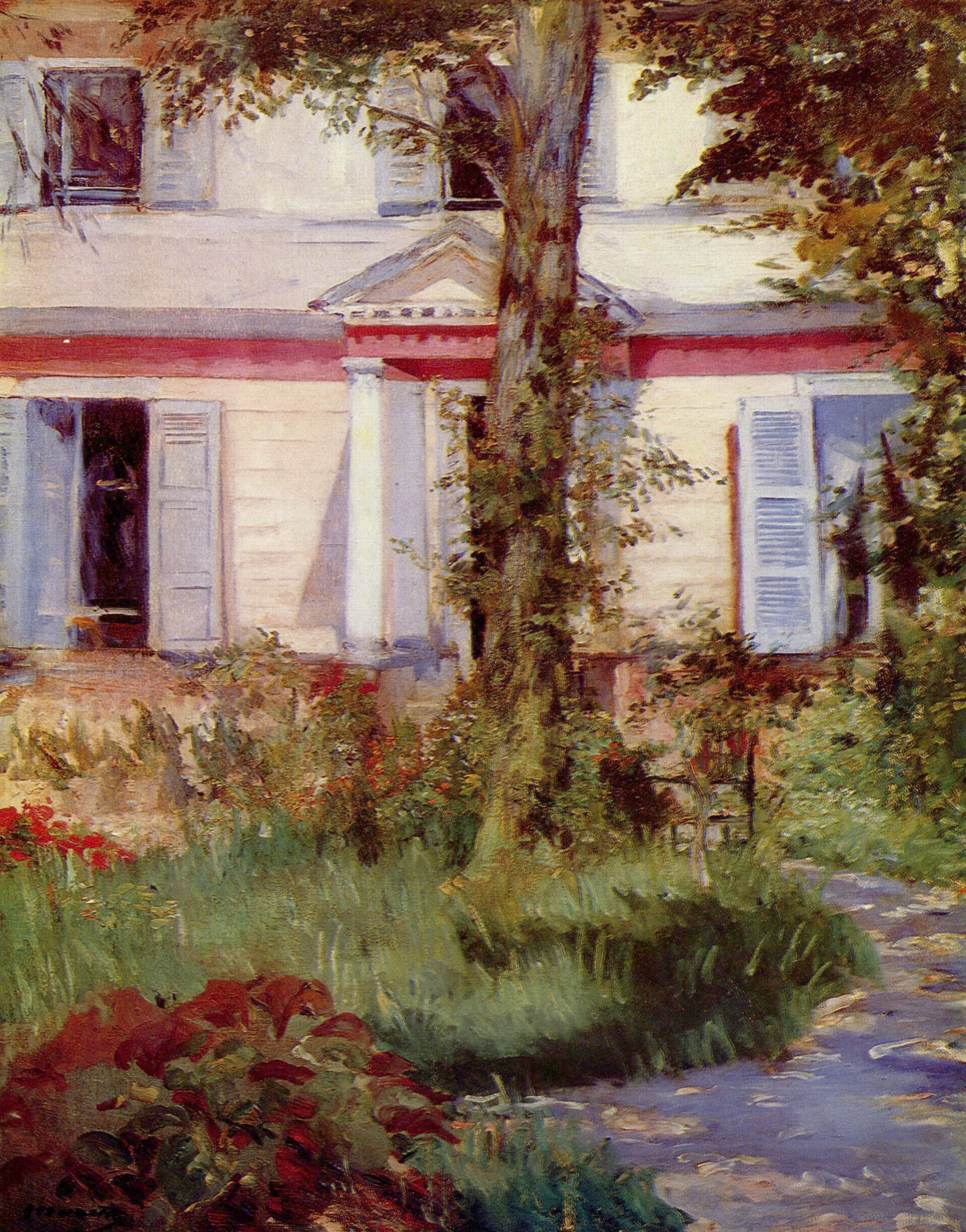
House in Rueil, 1882, National Gallery of Victoria

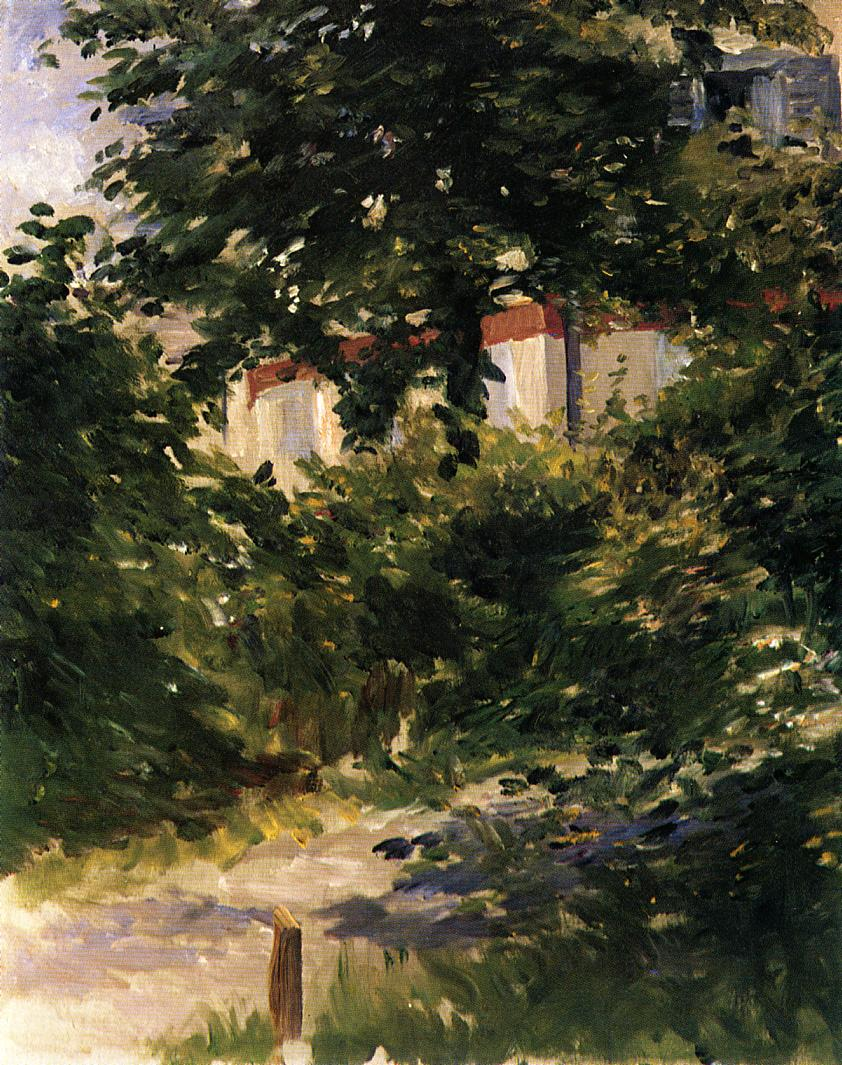
Garden Path in Rueil, 1882, Musée des Beaux-Arts de Dijon

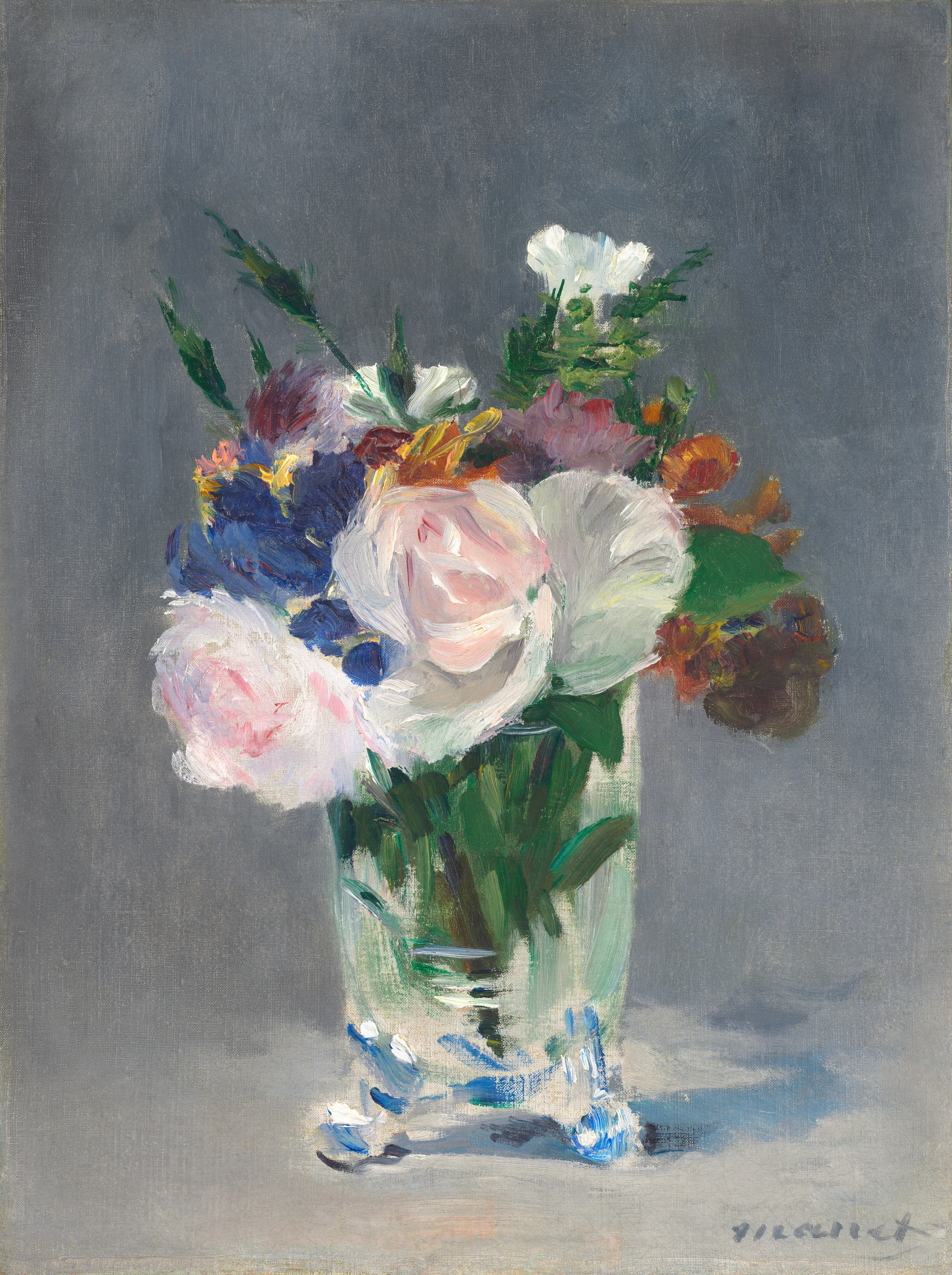
Flowers in a Crystal Vase, 1882, National Gallery of Art Washington

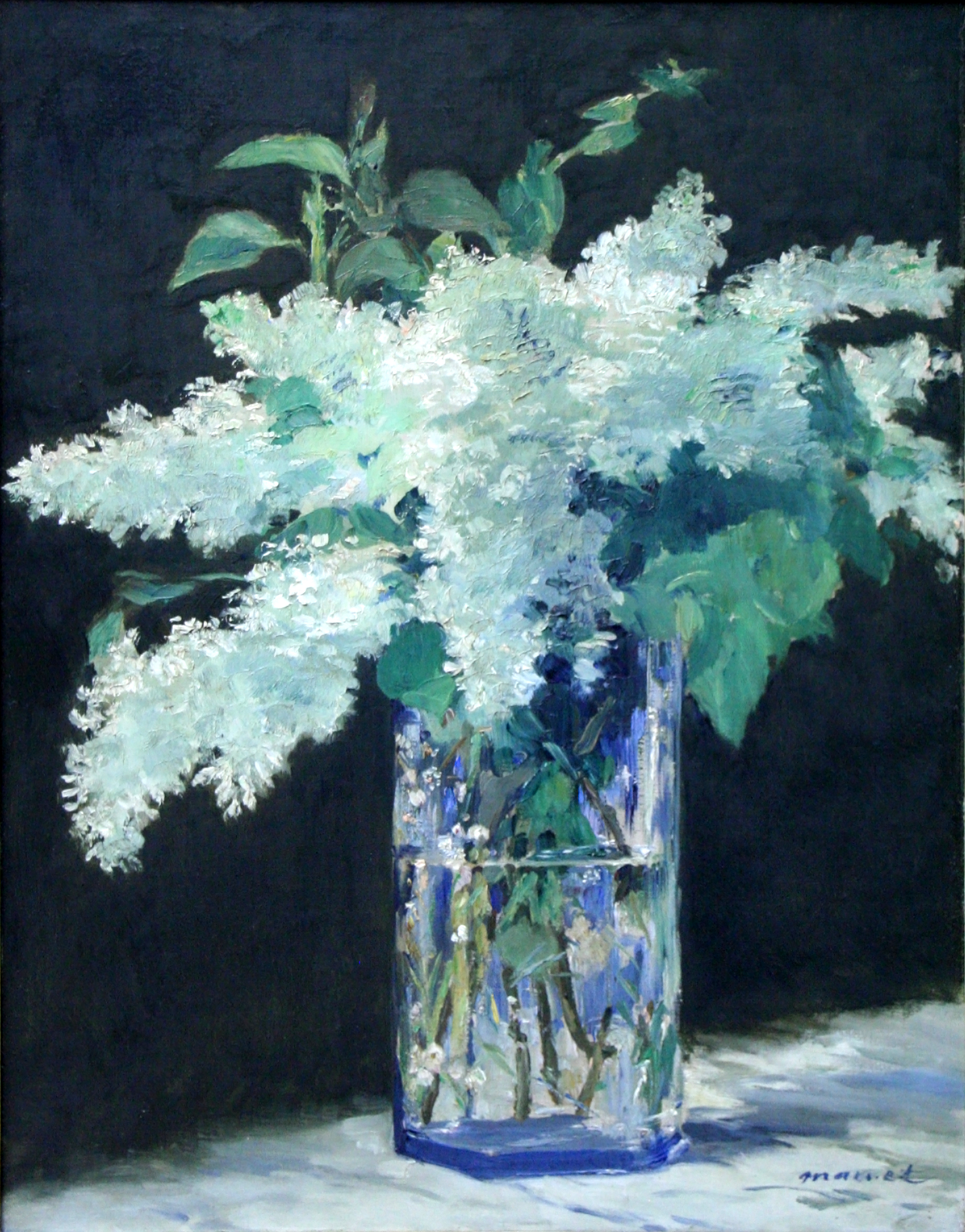
White Lilacs in a Glass Vase, 1883, Alte Nationalgalerie

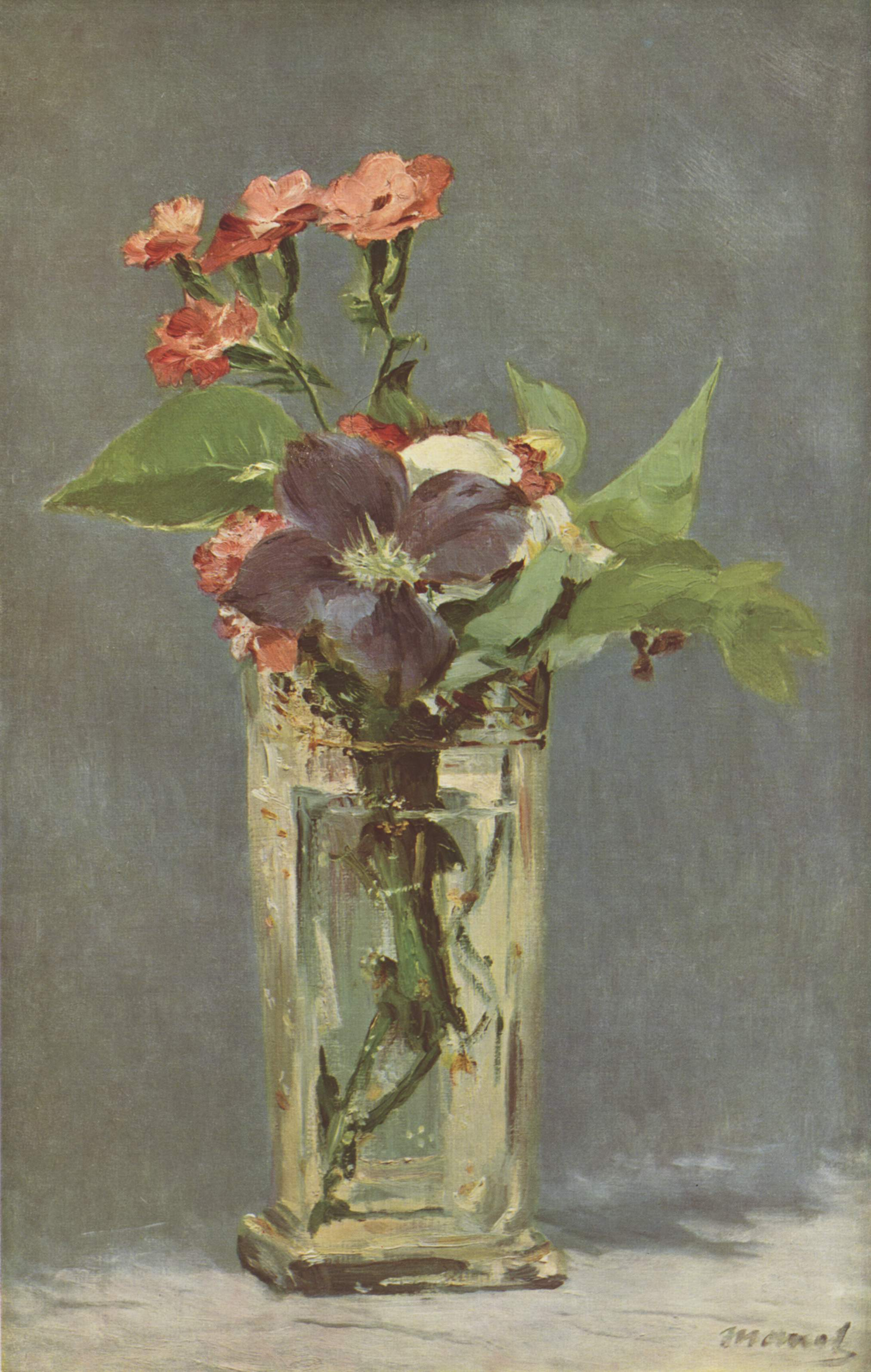
Flowers in a Crystal Vase, 1883, Musée d'Orsay

== See also ==
- List of paintings by Édouard Manet
- Realism
- Hispagnolisme
- Portraiture
- History of painting
- Western painting

== Sources ==
- Brombert, Beth Archer (1996). Édouard Manet: Rebel in a Frock Coat. Little, Brown. ISBN 0316109479. and Brombert, Beth Archer (1997). Édouard Manet: Rebel in a Frock Coat (paperback ed.). University of Chicago Press. ISBN 0226075443.
- Courthion, Pierre (1984). Manet. Harry N. Abrams. ISBN 0810913186.
- King, Ross (2006). The Judgment of Paris: The Revolutionary Decade that Gave the World Impressionism. New York: Waller & Company. ISBN 0802714668.
- Krell, Alan (1996). Manet and the Painters of Contemporary Life. Thames and Hudson. p. 83.
- Mauner, George L.; Loyrette, Henri (2000). Manet: The Still-Life Paintings. New York: H. N. Abrams in association with the American Federation of Arts. p. 66. ISBN 0810943913.
- Meyers, Jeffrey (2005). Impressionist Quartet: The Intimate Genius of Manet and Morisot, Degas and Cassatt. Harcourt. ISBN 9780151010769.
- Néret, Gilles (2003). Manet. Taschen. ISBN 3822819492.
- Stevens, Mary Anne; Nichols, Lawrence W., eds. (2012). Manet: Portraying Life. Toledo: Toledo Museum of Art. p. 199. ISBN 978-1907533532.
