= Albert Hecht =

French art collector (1842–1889)

Albert Hecht (Brussels, 2 July 1842 – Paris, 21 August 1889) was a French banker, dealer and art collector, considered one of the leading Impressionist collectors of the time.

== Early life ==
Hecht was born in Brussels to Maurice Hecht (born in Bad Dürkheim in 1814 and died in Paris in 1891), also an art collector, and his wife, Jeanne Kohn. Hecht had two brothers Myrtil and Henri. He and Henri built a private collection of hundreds of artworks, mainly Impressionist.

Hecht was friends with Édouard Manet, who art he also collected. He also befriended Edgar Degas, Claude Monet, Camille Pissarro, and Pierre-Auguste Renoir.

Hecht died at the age of 47 in Paris. He bequeathed his large private collection to his daughter Suzanne Hecht Pontremoli. The latter had married the well-known French architect Emmanuel Pontremoli.

== Collection Hecht ==
The collection contains paintings purchased by brothers Albert and Henri Hecht.

=== Van Oostsanen ===
- Jacob Pijnssen, executed in 1514 by Jacob Cornelisz van Oostsanen currently preserved at the Rijksmuseum Twenthe.

=== Flinck ===
- Ritratto di un uomo barbuto in busto, executed in 1638 by Govert Flinck currently held in a private collection.

=== Van der Werff ===
- Ritratto di una donna nelle vesti di Diana, executed in 1686 by Adriaen van der Werff currently held in a private collection.

=== Fragonard ===
- The Procuress, executed in 1770 by Jean-Honoré Fragonard currently preserved at the Fondazione Jan Krugier.
- Susannah e gli anziani, executed in 1776 by Jean-Honoré Fragonard currently held in a private collection.

=== Delacroix ===
- Cristo sul mare di Galilea, executed in 1852 by Eugène Delacroix currently housed in the Emil Bührle Collection.
- Saada, la moglie Abraham Ben-Chimol, e Préciada, una delle loro figlie, performed in 1832 by Eugène Delacroix currently housed in the Metropolitan Museum of Art.
- Dedham Lock (1820), 1820 by John Constable.

=== Daumier ===
- Lettura, 1860 by Honoré Daumier currently in a private collection in New York City.

=== Gonzales ===
- La pianta fiorita, 1872 da Eva Gonzalès currently in a private collection.
- La servitrice, 1865 by Eva Gonzalès currently in a private collection.
- Donna con pappagallo, 1866 by Édouard Manet currently at Metropolitan Museum of Art.
- Ragazzo che soffia bolle di sapone, 1867 by Édouard Manet currently at Museu Calouste-Gulbenkian.
- The Croquet Game, 1873 by Édouard Manet currently at Städel Museum.
- The Swallows, 1873 by Édouard Manet currently in the Bührle Collection at the Kunsthaus Zürich.
- La viennese, 1881 da Édouard Manet at Museo d'Orsay.
- Fuga di Rochefort, 1881 da Édouard Manet at Museo d'Orsay.
- Ritratto di Suzanne Hecht, by Édouard Manet nel 1882 at Museo d'Orsay.
- Ballo in maschera all'Opera, eseguito da Édouard Manet nel 1873 attualmente conservato presso il National Gallery of Art.

=== Monet ===
- Vista di un porto, eseguito da Claude Monet nel 1871 attualmente conservato presso una collezione privata.
- Barche nel porto di Londra, eseguito da Claude Monet nel 1871 attualmente conservato presso una collezione privata.
- Les déchargeurs de charbon, by Claude Monet 1875
- Il lungo mare d'Argenteuil, 1882 by Claude Monet at National Gallery of Art.
- Regata a Sainte-Adresse, l 1867 by Claude Monet at Metropolitan Museum of Art

=== Corot ===
- La sera al lago d'Albano, Jean-Baptiste Camille Corotl 1855 currently in a private collection
- Mattina sotto gli alberi, eseguito da Jean-Baptiste Camille Corot nel 1875 currently in a private collection
- Souvenir of the Environs of Lake Nemi, by Jean-Baptiste Camille Corot nel 1865 at thel Art Institute of Chicago.
- L'odalisque Sicilienne, eseguito da Jean-Baptiste Camille Corot nel 1872.

=== Courbet ===
- L'uomo Ferito, eseguito nel 1844 da Gustave Courbet.
- Madame Auguste Cuoq,1852, by Gustave Courbet, currently in the Metropolitan Museum of Art.
- Le Rut du printemps. Combat de cerfs,1861, by Gustave Courbet, currently in the Musée d'Orsay.
- Gustave Courbet, The Spring Carriageway. The Struggle of the Stags, 1861
- Rocky Edges of la Loue, executed in 1864 by Gustave Courbet, now in a private collection.
- The Waterfall, executed in 1874 by Gustave Courbet, currently held in a private collection.
- The Source of the Lison, executed in 1864 by Gustave Courbet, currently in the Berlin State Museums.
- The Wave, executed in 1865 by Gustave Courbet currently housed in the Walters Art Museum.[15]
- The Immensity, executed in 1869 by Gustave Courbet currently conserved at the Victoria and Albert Museum.

=== Degas ===
- Il Balletto di Robert le Diable, eseguito da Edgar Degas nel 1871 attualmente conservato presso il Metropolitan Museum of Art.
- Il Balletto dell'Opera di Parigi, eseguito da Edgar Degas nel 1877 attualmente conservato presso il Art Institute of Chicago.

=== Renoir ===
- Prima del bagno, eseguito nel 1873 da Pierre-Auguste Renoir attualmente conservato presso il Barnes Foundation.

=== Barye ===
- Gruppo di bisonti, eseguito nel 1810 da Antoine-Louis Barye attualmente conservato presso il Metropolitan Museum of Art.

=== Sisley ===
- Il lavatoio di Bougival, eseguito nel 1877 da Alfred Sisley attualmente conservato presso una collezione privata.

== Gallery ==
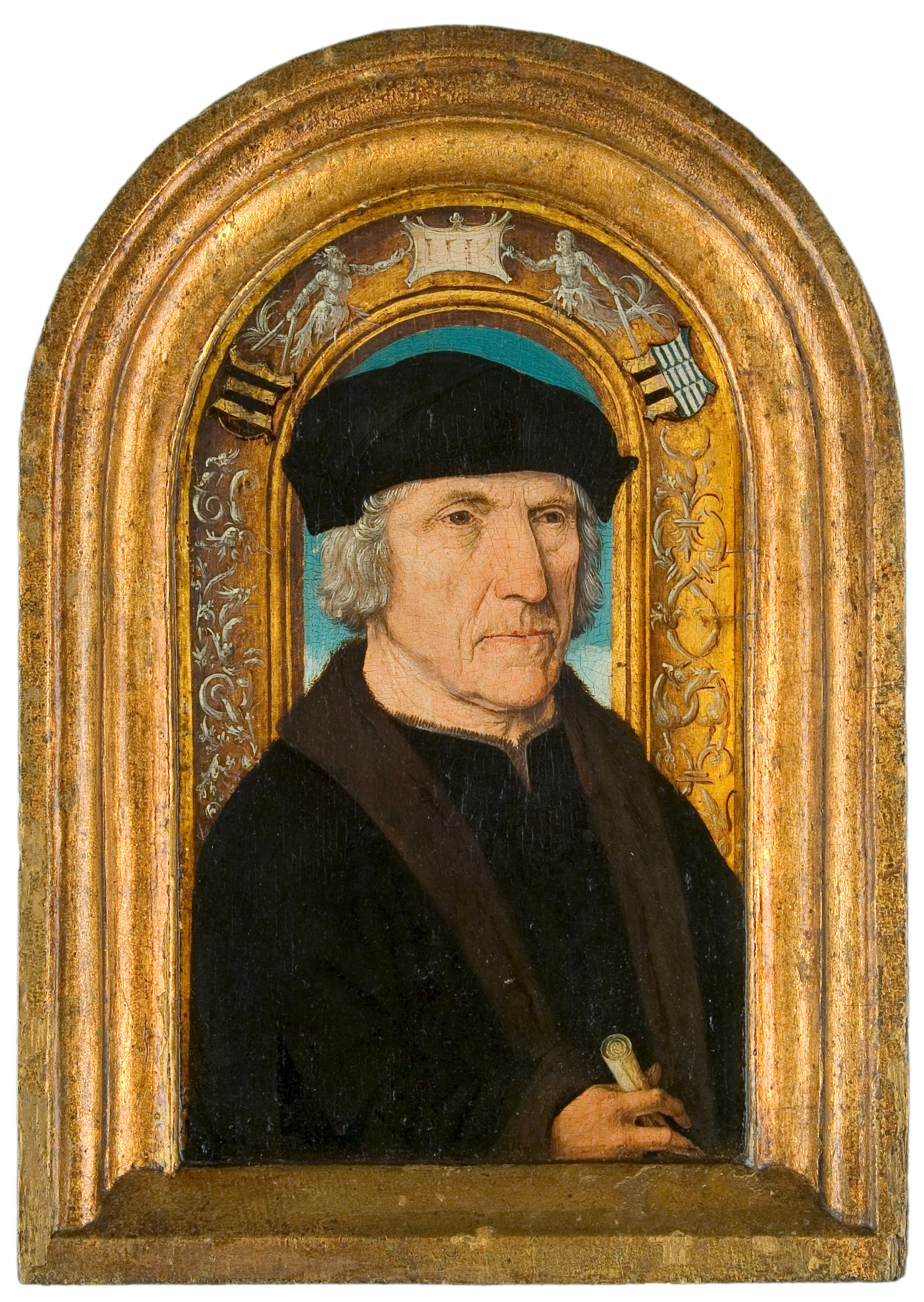
Jacob Cornelisz van Oostsanen, Jacob Pijnssen, 1514

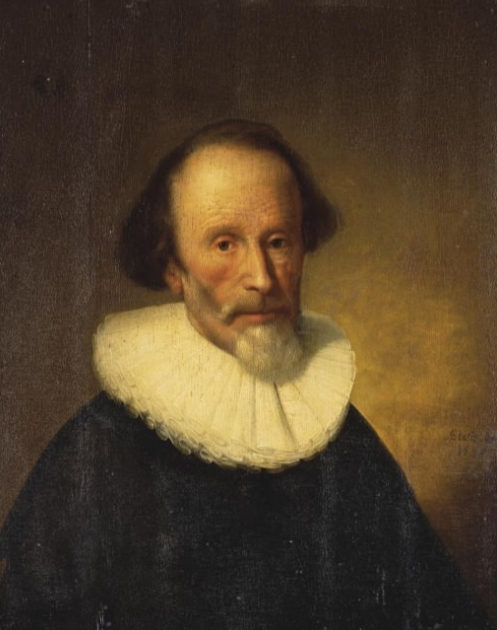
Govert Flinck, Ritratto di un uomo barbuto in busto, 1638

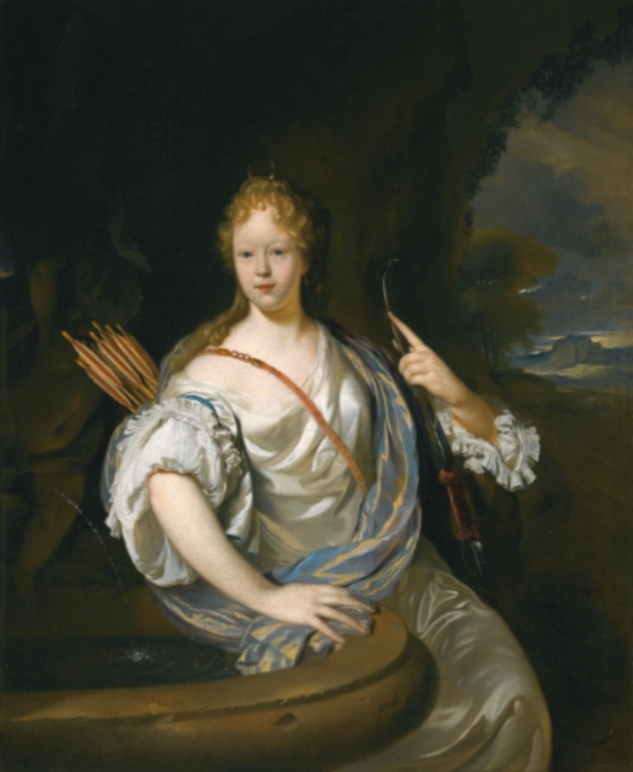
Adriaen van der Werff, Ritratto di una donna nelle vesti di Diana, 1686

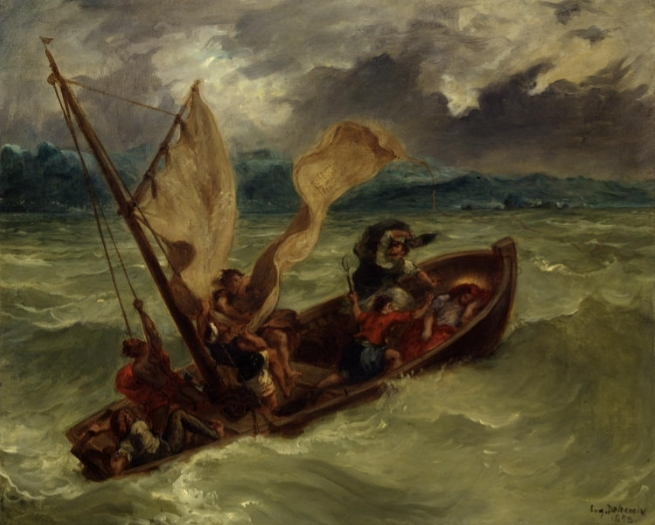
Eugène Delacroix, Cristo sul mare di Galilea, 1853

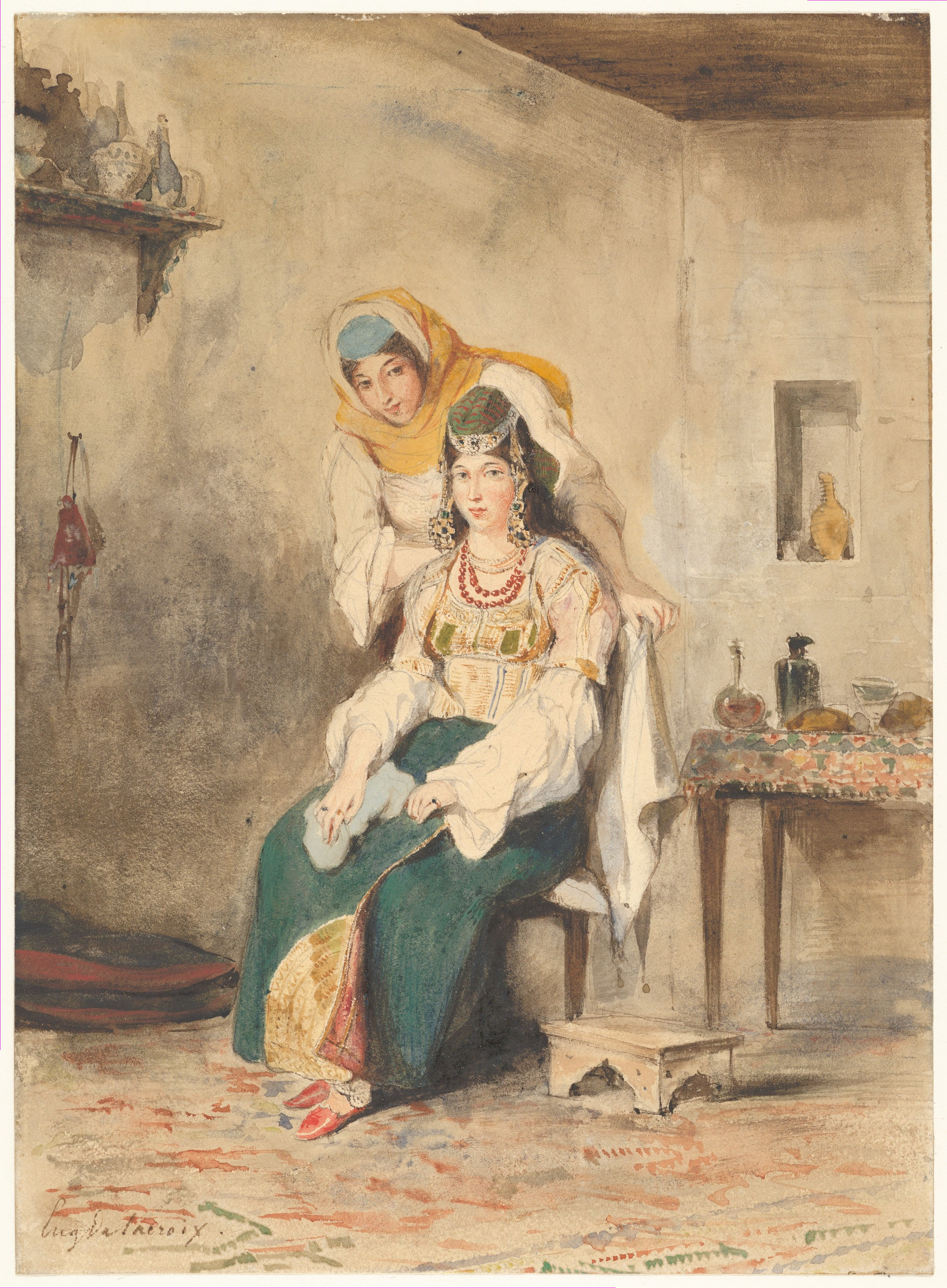
Eugène Delacroix, Saada, la moglie Abraham Ben-Chimol, e Préciada, una delle loro figlie, 1832

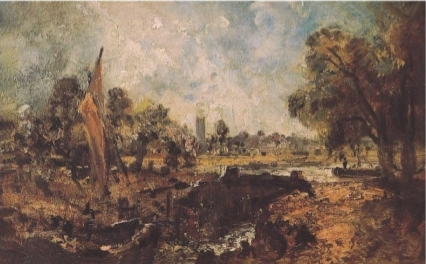
John Constable, Dedham Lock, 1820

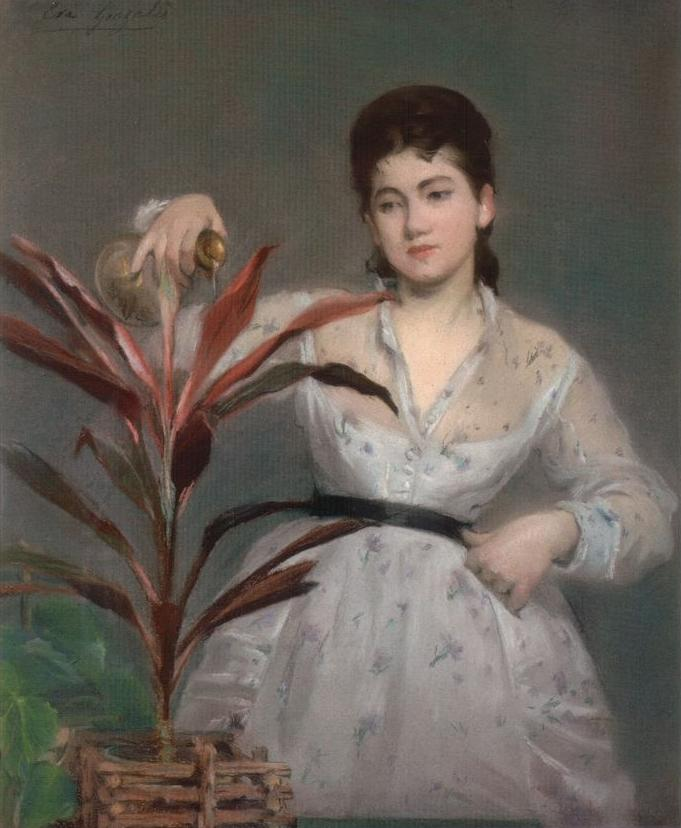
Eva Gonzalès, La pianta fiorita, 1872

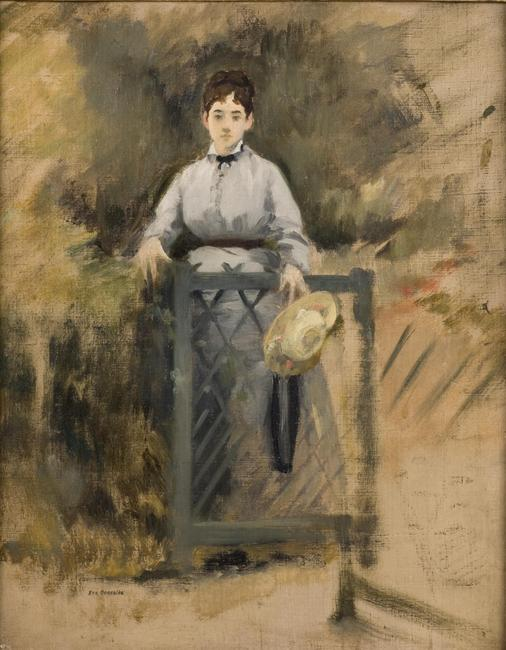
Eva Gonzalès, La servitrice, 1864

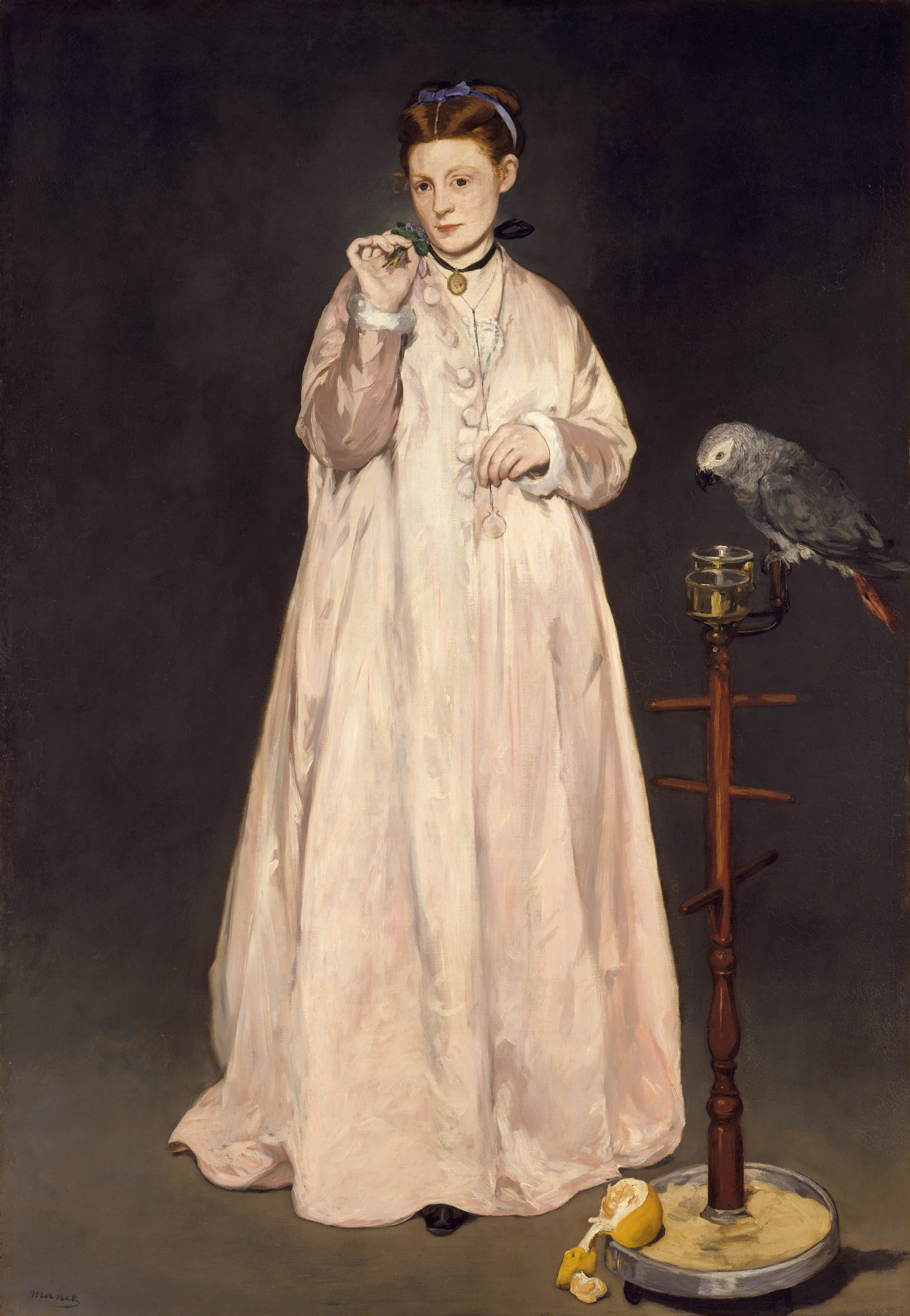
Édouard Manet, Donna con pappagallo, 1866

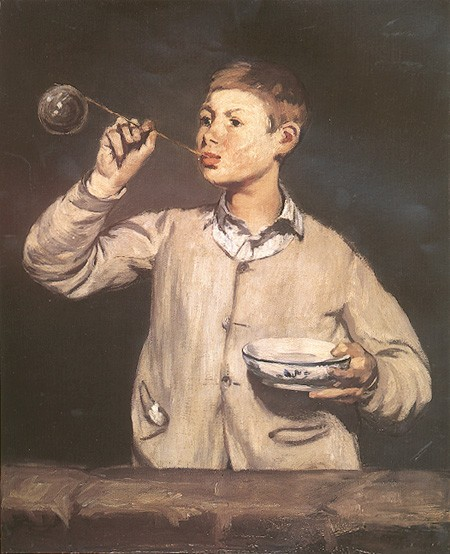
Édouard Manet, Ragazzo che soffia bolle di sapone, 1867

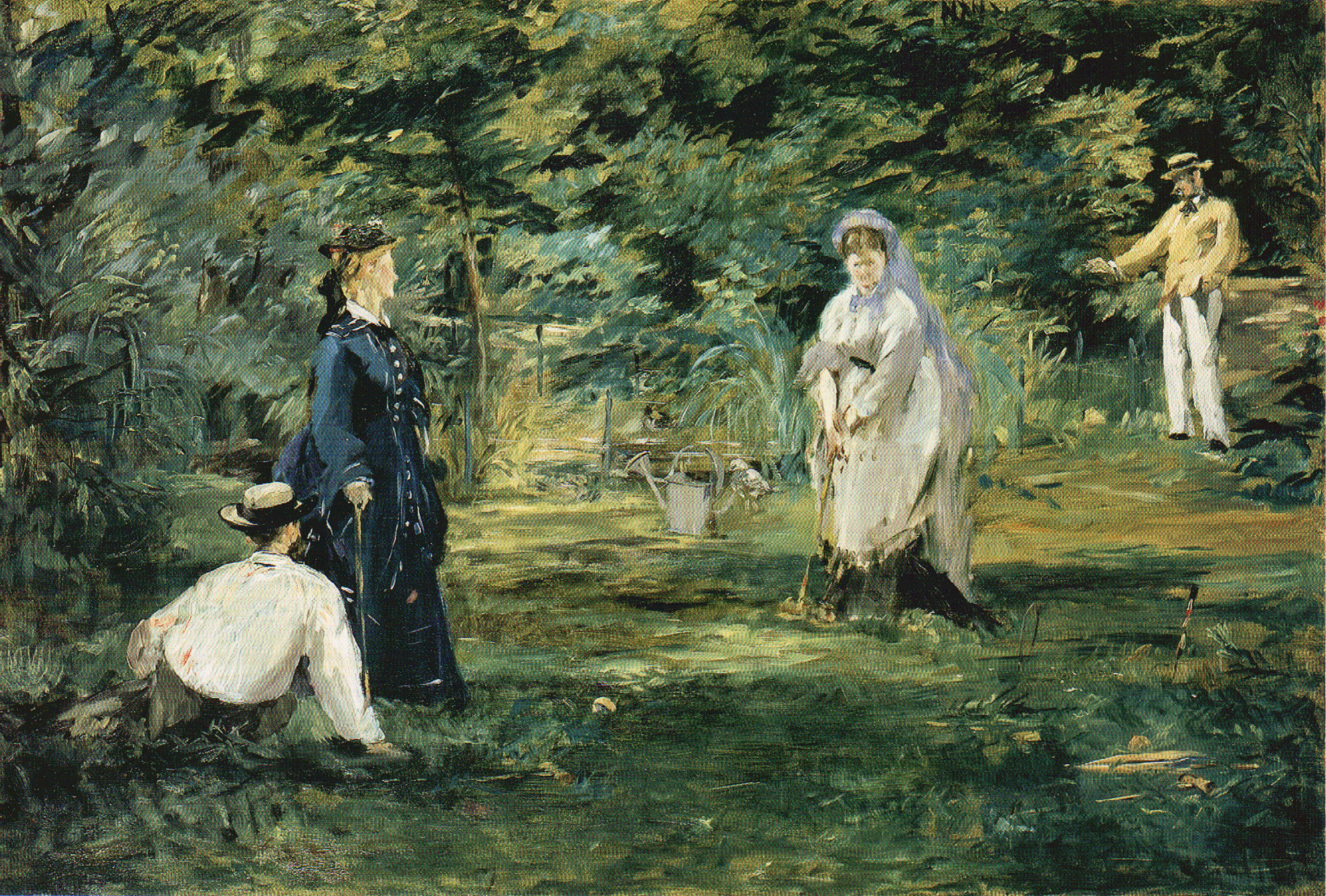
Édouard Manet, The Croquet Game, 1873

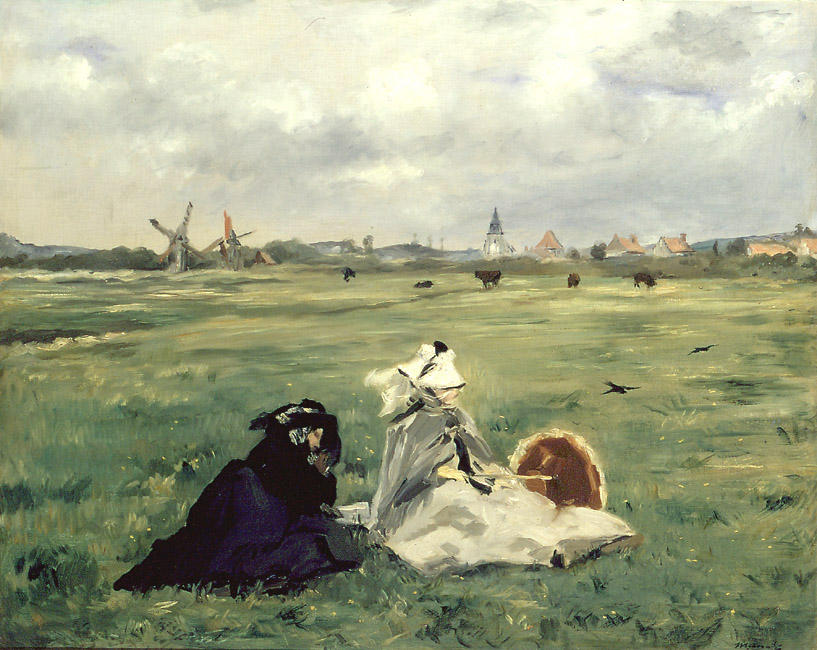
Édouard Manet, Swallows, 1873

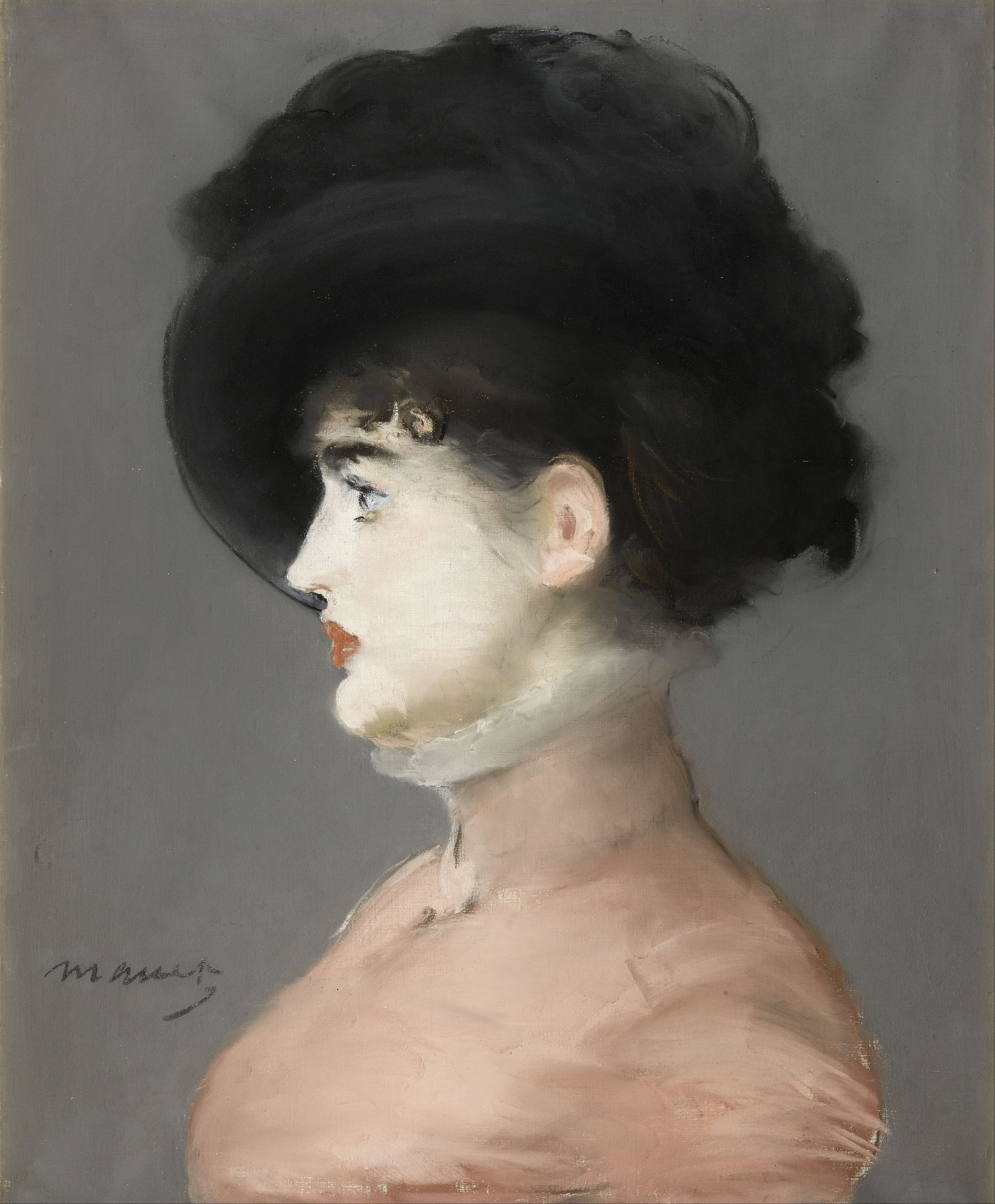
Édouard Manet, La Viennese, 1881

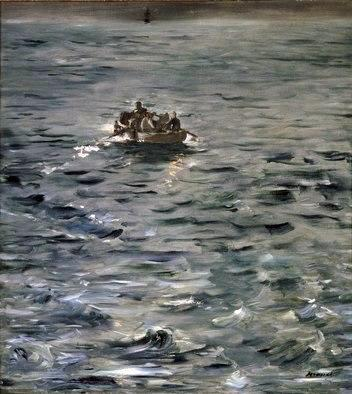
Édouard Manet, The Escape of Rochefort (1880-81) Museo d'Orsay di Parigi

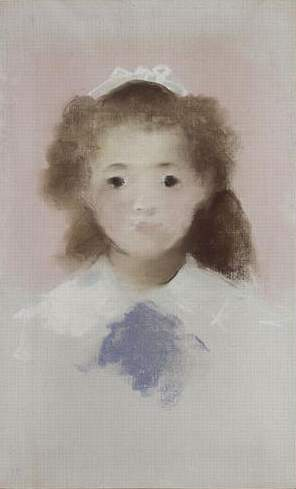
Suzanne Hecht Pontremoli, 1882 eseguito da Édouard Manet, Museo d'Orsay

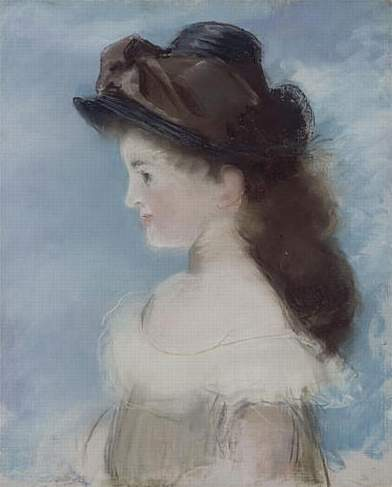
Suzanne Hecht Pontremoli 1882 eseguito da Édouard Manet, Museo d'Orsay

Édouard Manet, Ballo in maschera all'Opera, 1873

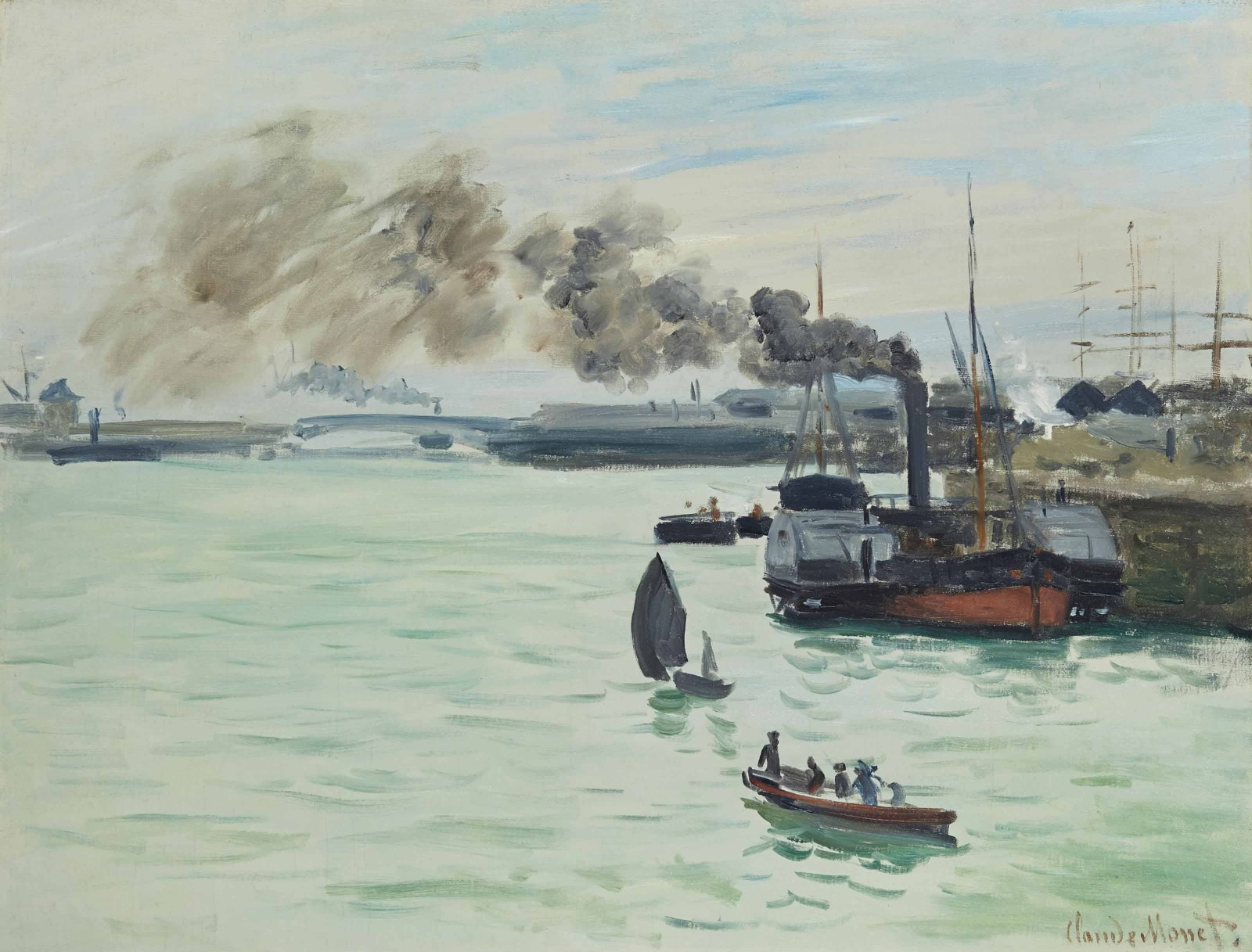
Claude Monet, Vista di un porto, 1871

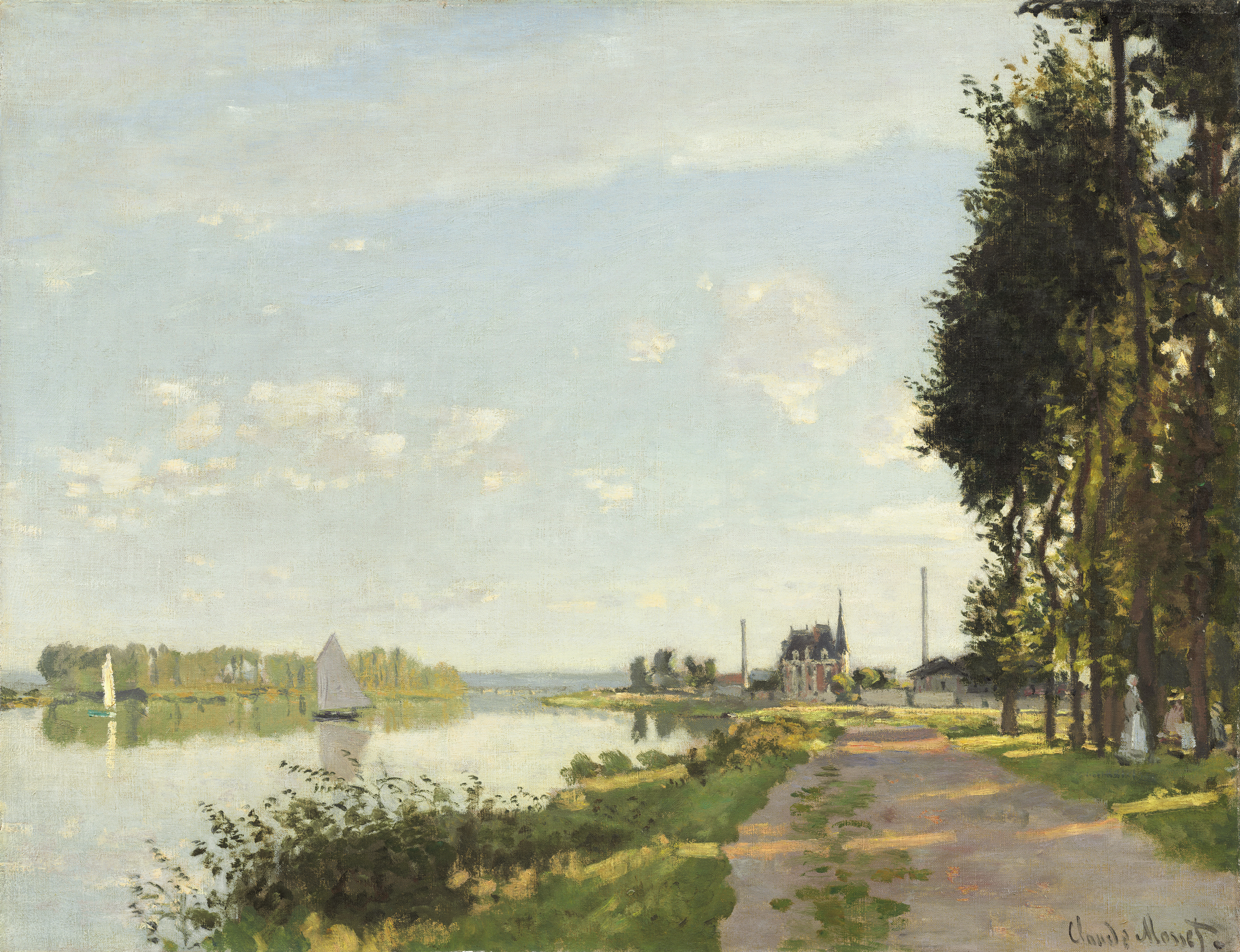
Claude Monet, Il lungo mare d'Argenteuil, 1882

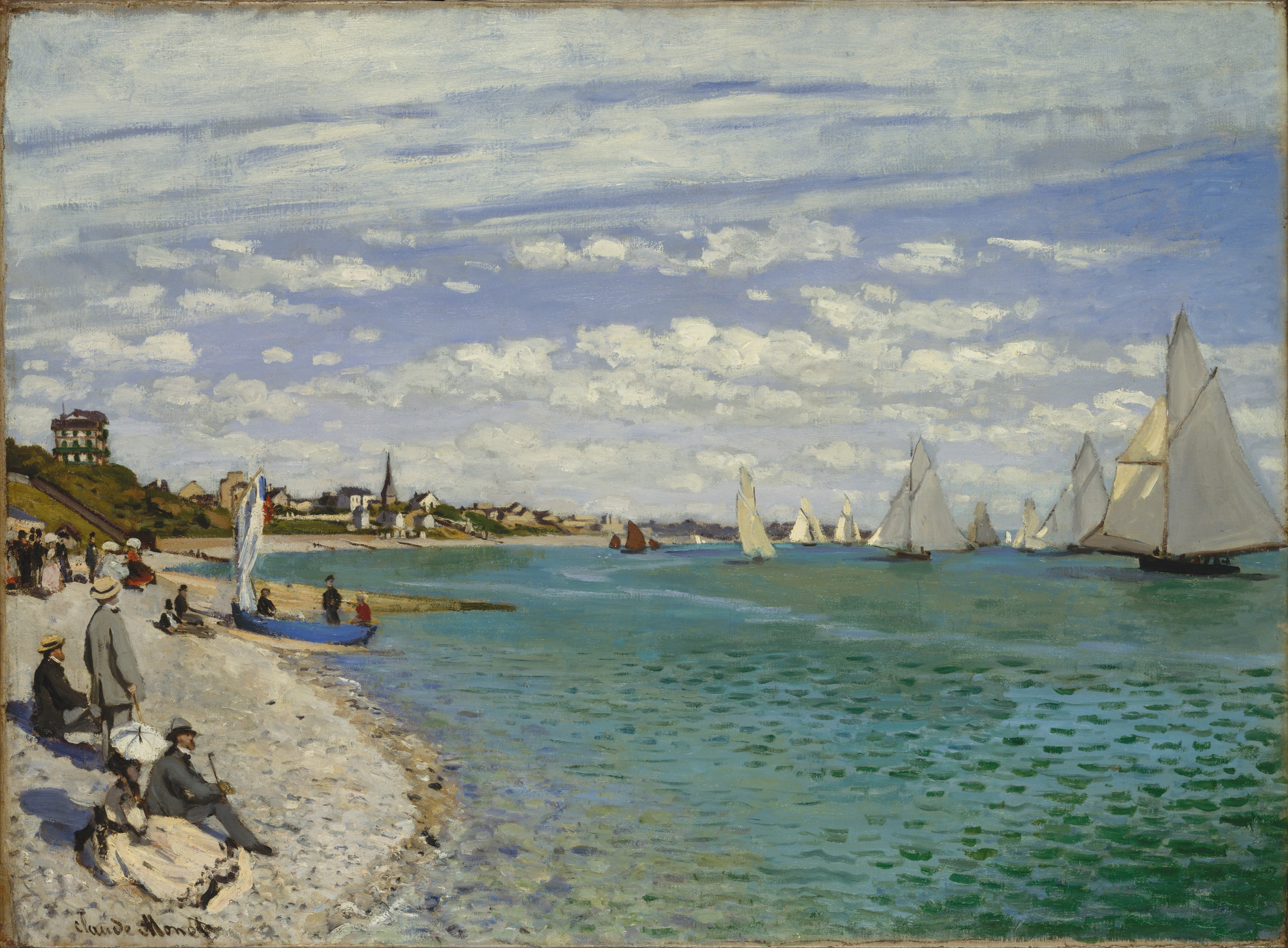
Claude Monet, Regata a Sainte-Adresse, 1867

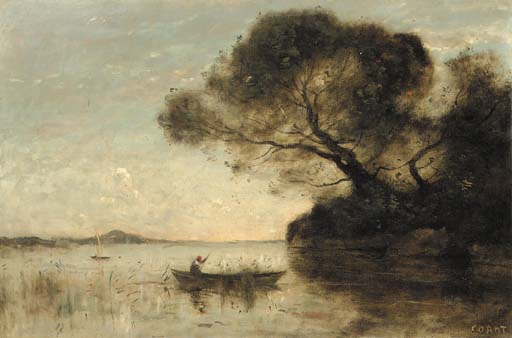
Jean-Baptiste Camille Corot, La sera al lago d'Albano, 1855

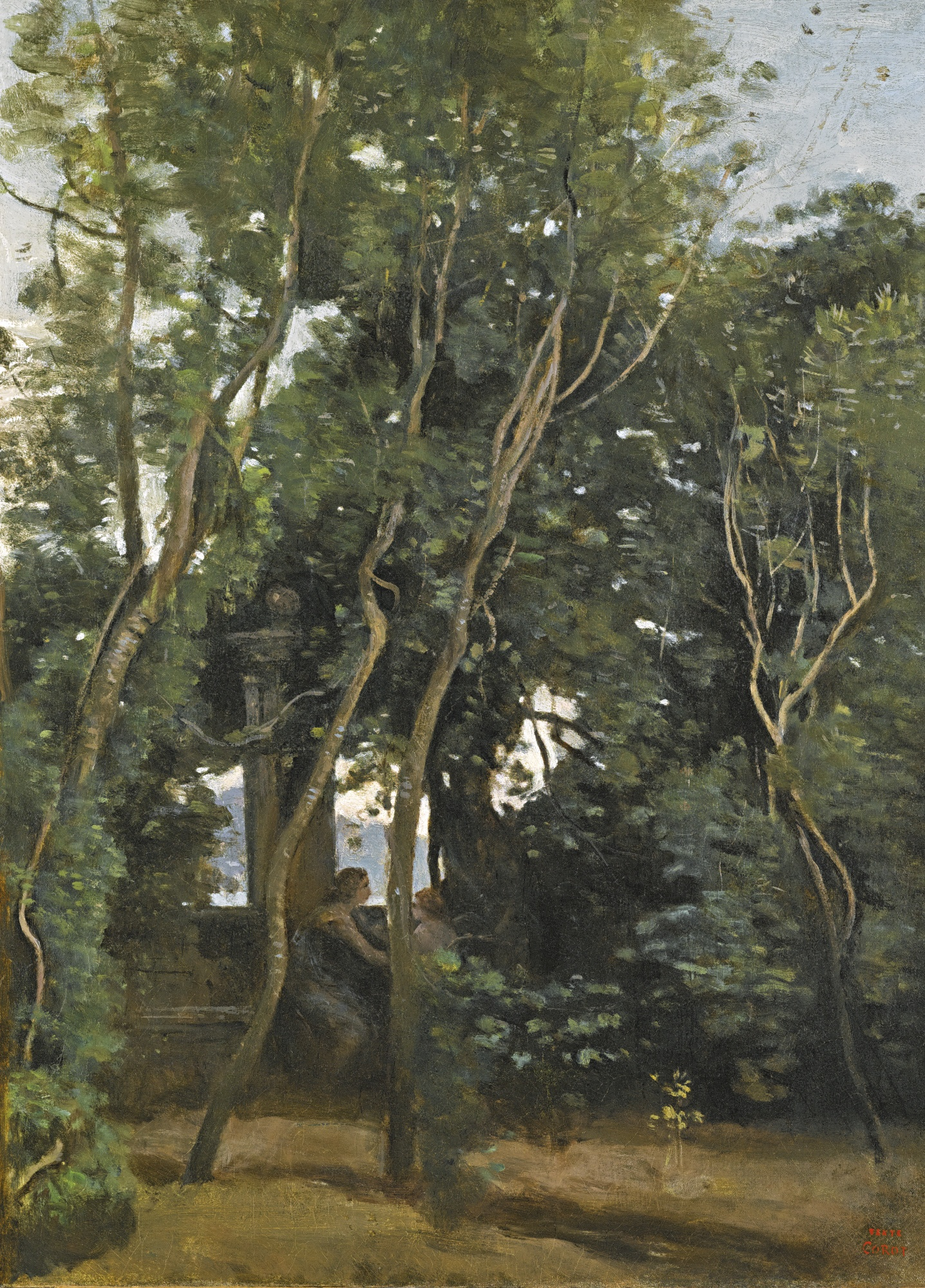
Jean-Baptiste Camille Corot, Mattina sotto gli alberi, 1875

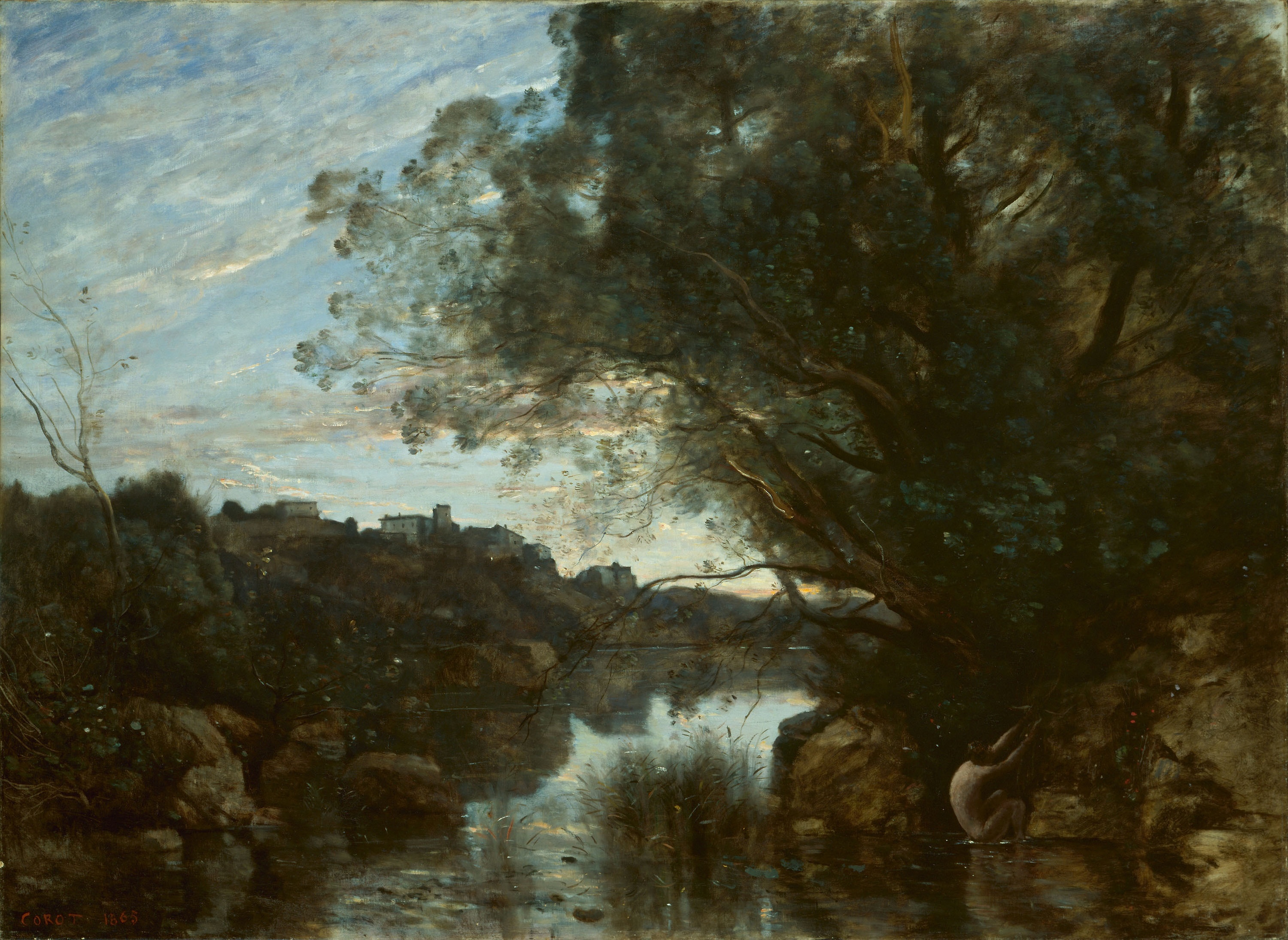
Jean-Baptiste Camille Corot, Souvenir of the Environs of Lake Nemi, 1865

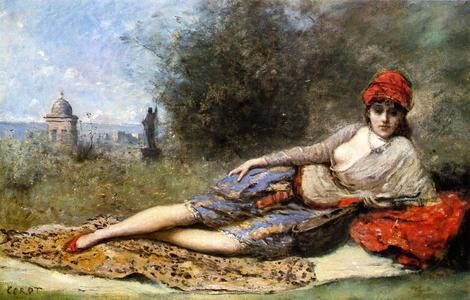
Jean-Baptiste Camille Corot, L'odalisque Sicilienne Corot, 1872

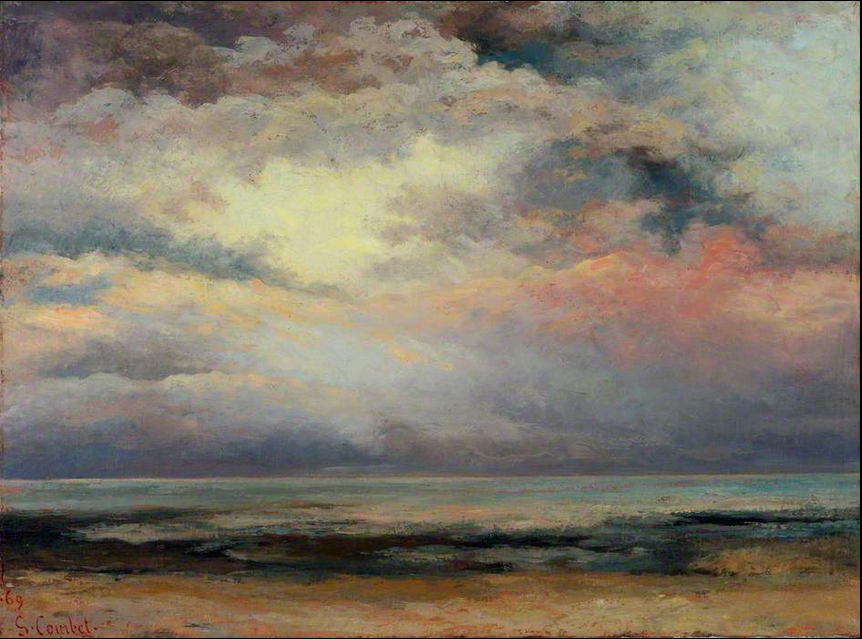
Gustave Courbet, L'immensità, 1869

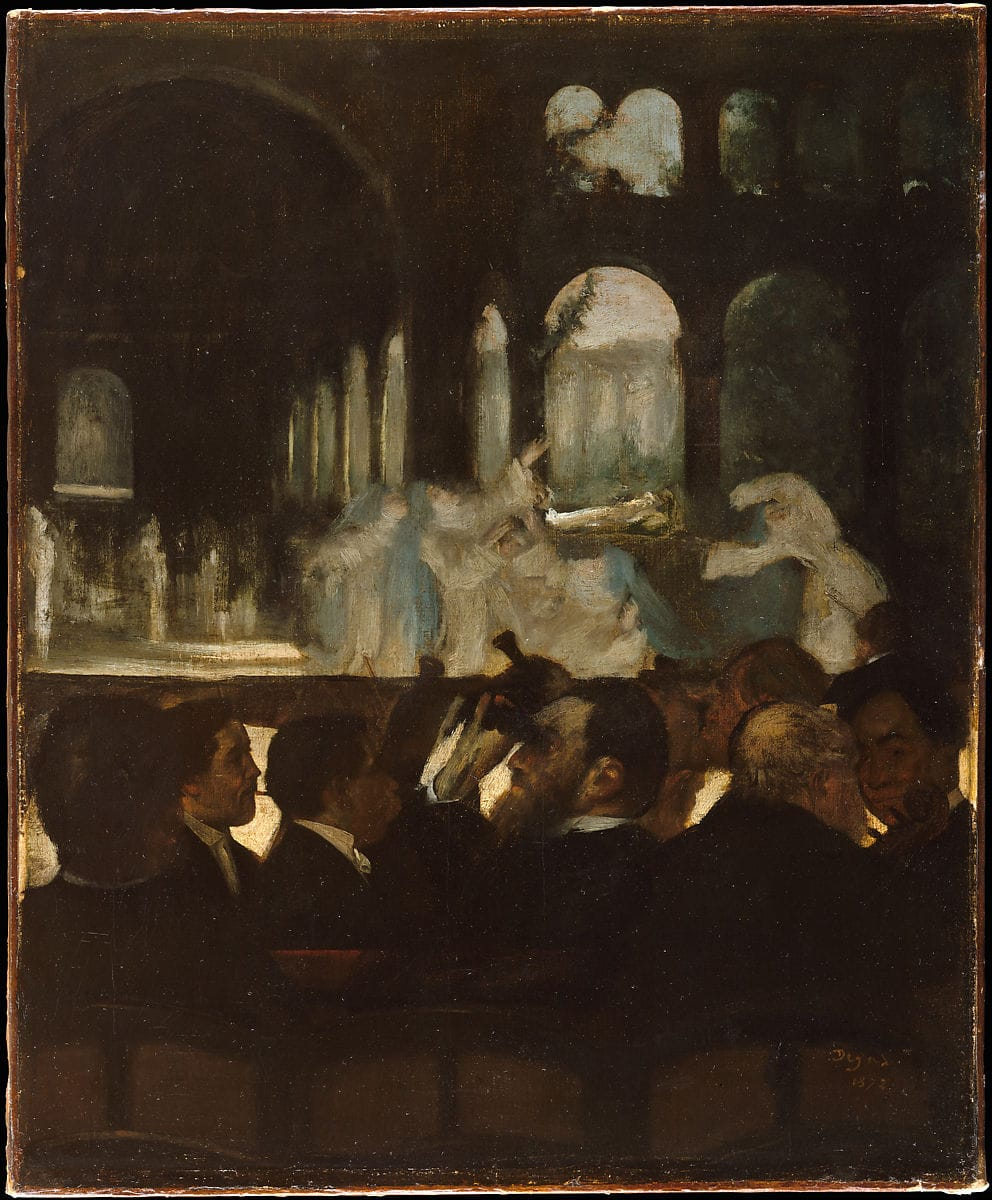
Edgar Degas, Il Balletto di Robert le Diable, 1871

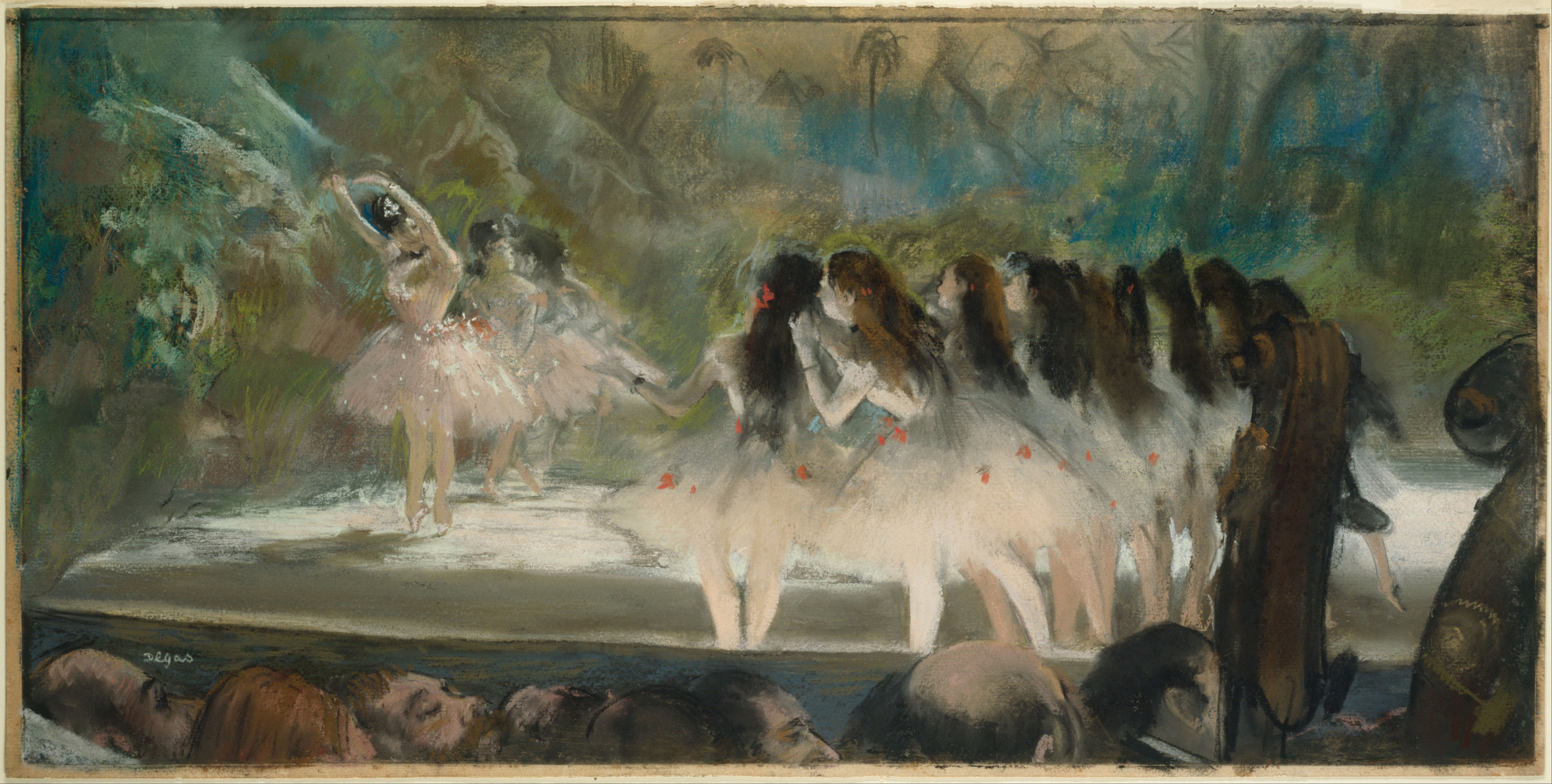
Edgar Degas, Il balletto dell'Opera di Parigi, 1877

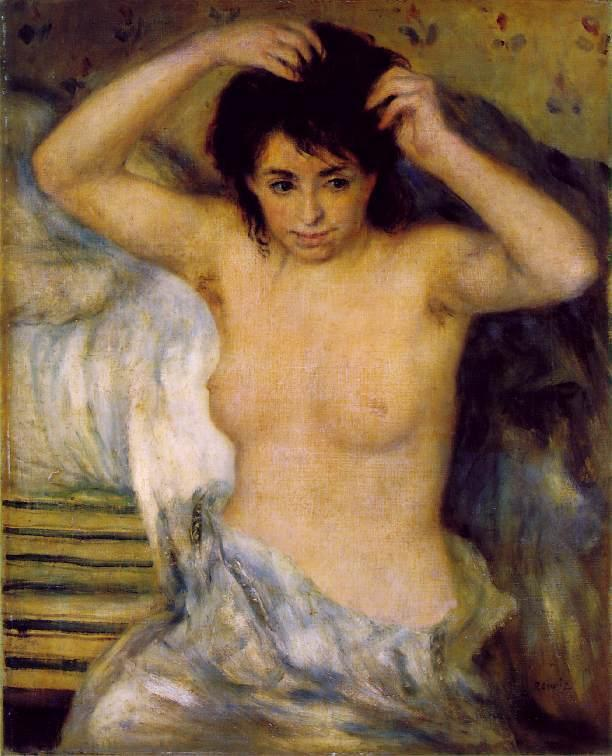
Pierre-Auguste Renoir, Prima del bagno, 1873

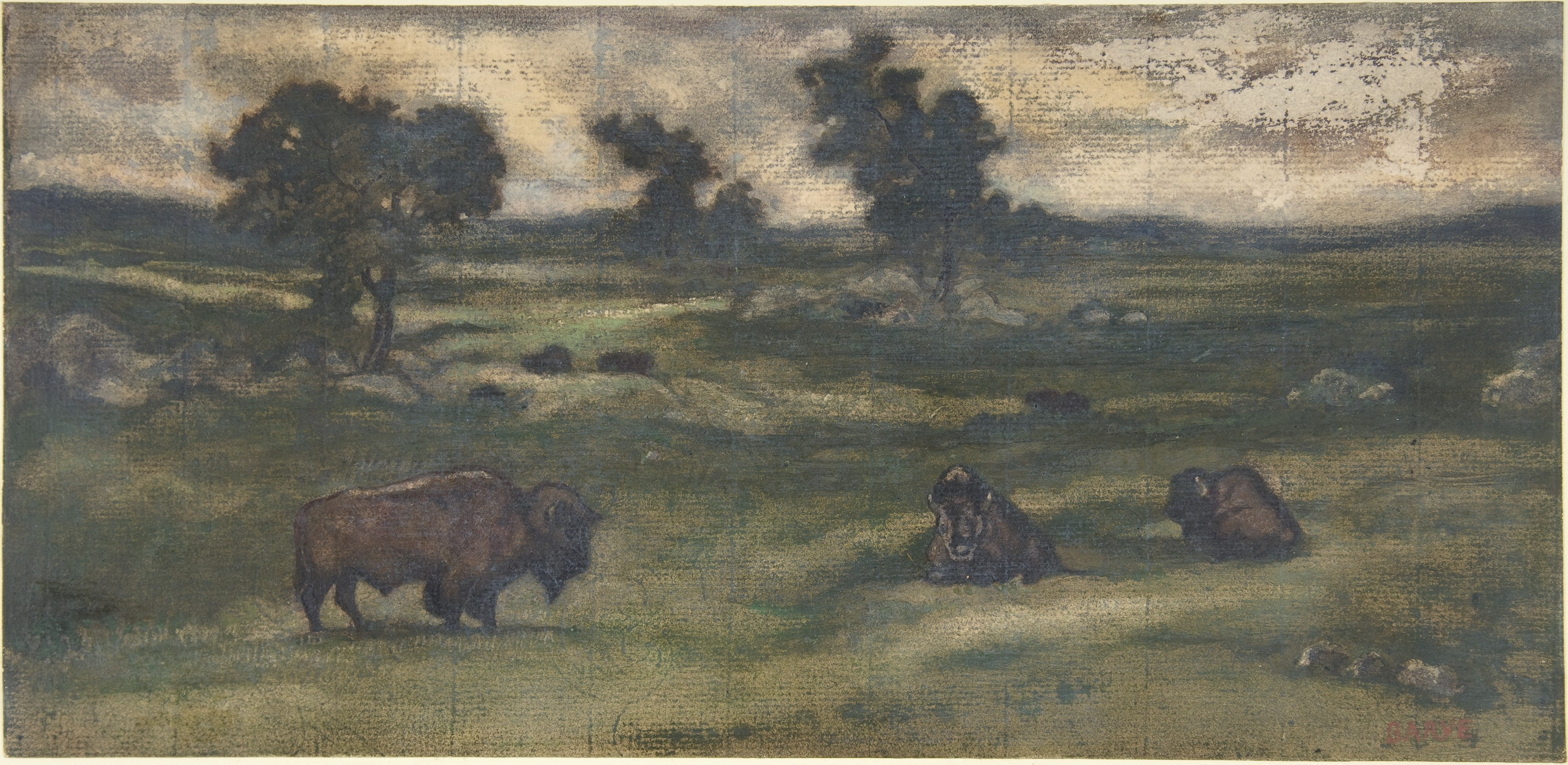
Antoine-Louis Barye, Gruppo di bisonti, 1810

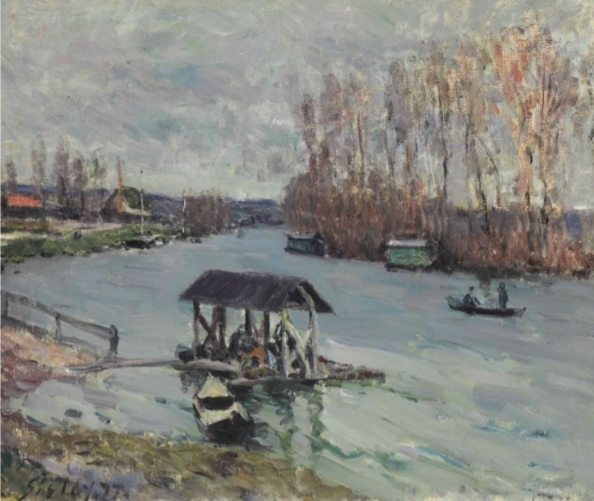
Alfred Sisley, Il Lavatoio di Bougival, 1877

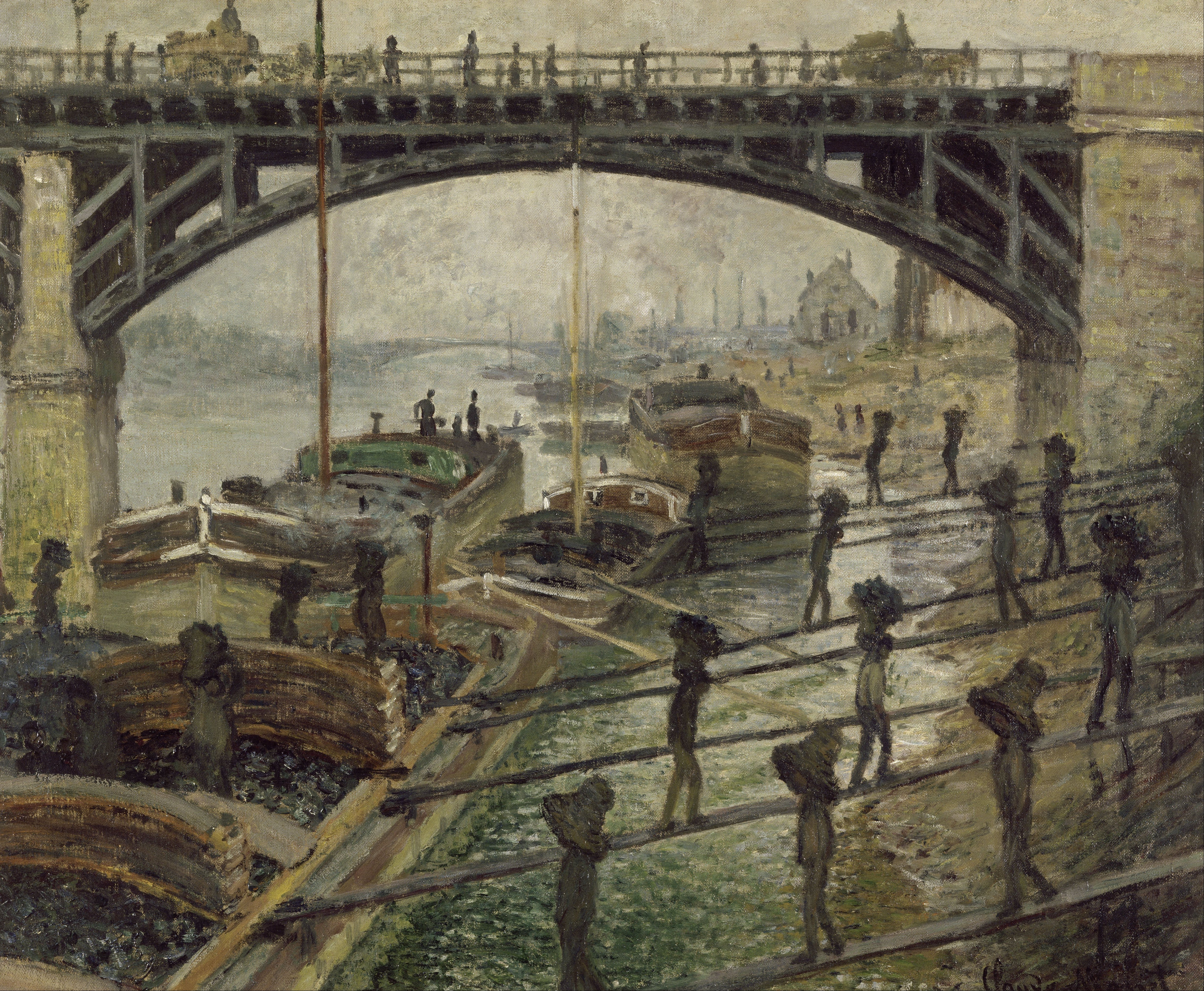
Claude Monet, Les déchargeurs de charbon, 1875

== Bibliography ==
- Masterpieces of French Painting from the Bührle Collection, 1961.
