= Suzanne Hecht Pontremoli =

French art collector (1876–1956)

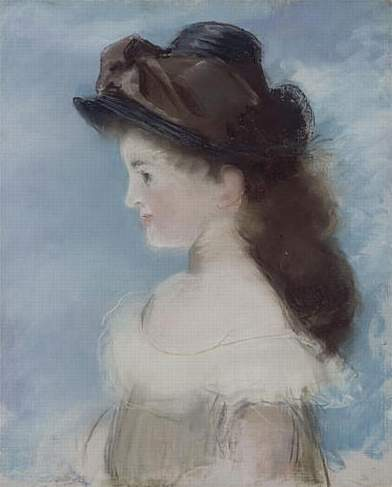
Suzanne Hecht Pontremoli 1882 by Edouard Manet, Orsay Museum

Suzanne Hecht Pontremoli (Paris, 31 December 1876 – Paris, 19 March 1956) was a French art collector.

== Biography ==
Suzanne Hecht was born in Paris to Albert Hecht (born in Brussels on 2 July 1842 and died in Paris on 21 August 1889), one of the greatest and most important Impressionist collectors, and Mathilde Oulman (born in Versailles on 8 July 1849 and died in Paris in 1937). In 1896 she married the famous Italian-born architect Emmanuel Pontremoli, grandson of Eliseo Pontremoli.

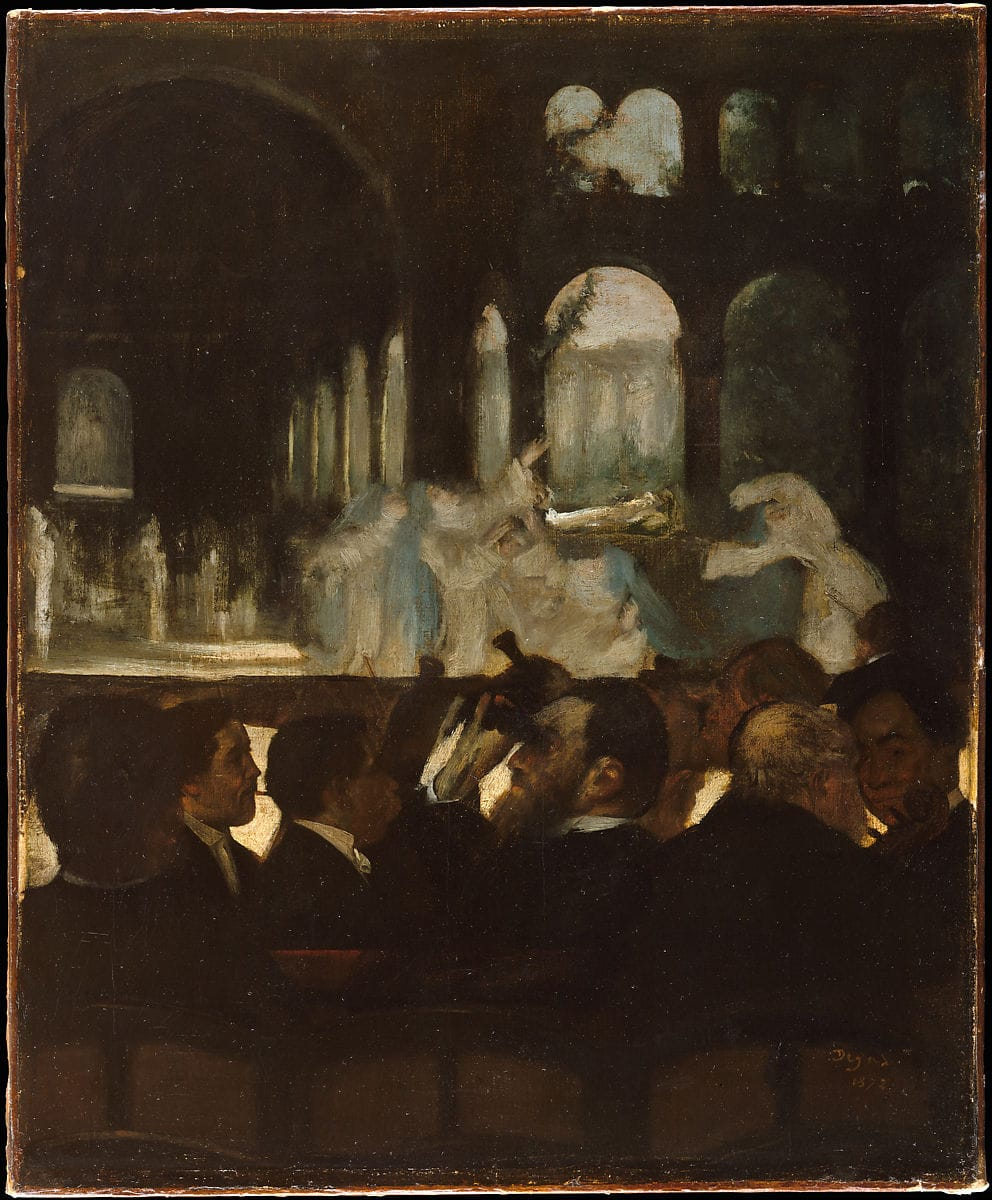
Albert Hecht depicted in the centre with binoculars by Edgar Degas, 1871

Her father Albert had his friend Édouard Manet make three portraits of his daughter, dated 1882. They are currently in the Musée d'Orsay.

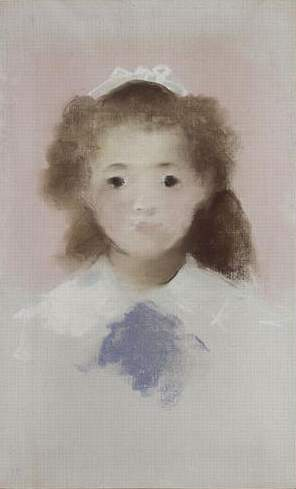
Suzanne Hecht Pontremoli, 1882 by Édouard Manet, Musée d'Orsay

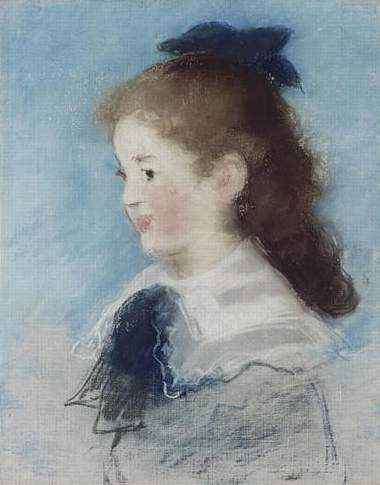
Suzanne Hecht Pontremoli 1882 by Édouard Manet, Museo d'Orsay

With her husband Emmanuel Pontremoli, she began collecting the works of the most influential artists of the time, including John Constable, Eugène Delacroix, Édouard Manet, Claude Monet and Jean-Baptiste Camille Corot, some of which she inherited from her father.

During the Nazi occupation of France, his sons Michel Pontremoli and Jean Pontremoli enlisted and fought with the French partisan force. In 1944, they both died at the hands of the Nazis.

When Emmanuel Pontremoli died in 1956, he left his entire art collection to his daughter Thérèse (1900-1989).

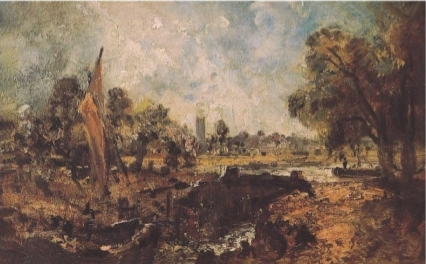
Dedham Lock, 1820 by John Constable owned by Suzanne Hecht P.

Following the death of his daughter Therese in 1987, some paintings were given to the Louvre Museum in Paris.

== Works from the S.Hecht E.Pontremoli Collection ==
The collection includes paintings collected by Suzanne and her husband Emmanuel Pontremoli.

=== Watteau ===
- Donne vestite con grandi cappotti, una con in mano una maschera, executed in 1799 by Jean-Antoine Watteau.

=== Constable ===
- Dedham Lock, executed in 1820 by John Constable.
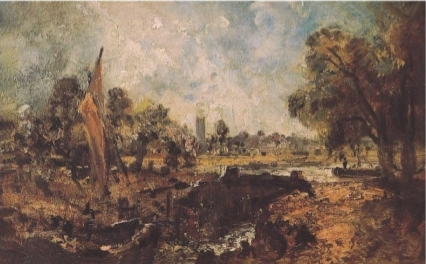
  John Constable, Dedham Lock, 1820

=== Manet ===
- Ragazzo che soffia bolle di sapone, executed in 1867 by Édouard Manet currently in the collection of the Museu Calouste-Gulbenkian.
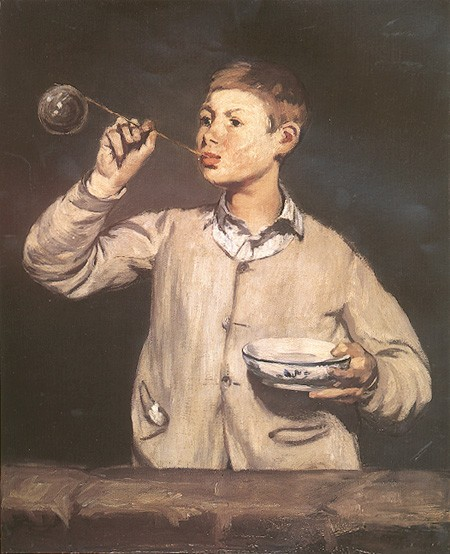
  Édouard Manet, Ragazzo che soffia bolle di sapone, 1867
- Donna con pappagallo, executed in 1866 by Édouard Manet currently in the collection of the Metropolitan Museum of Art.
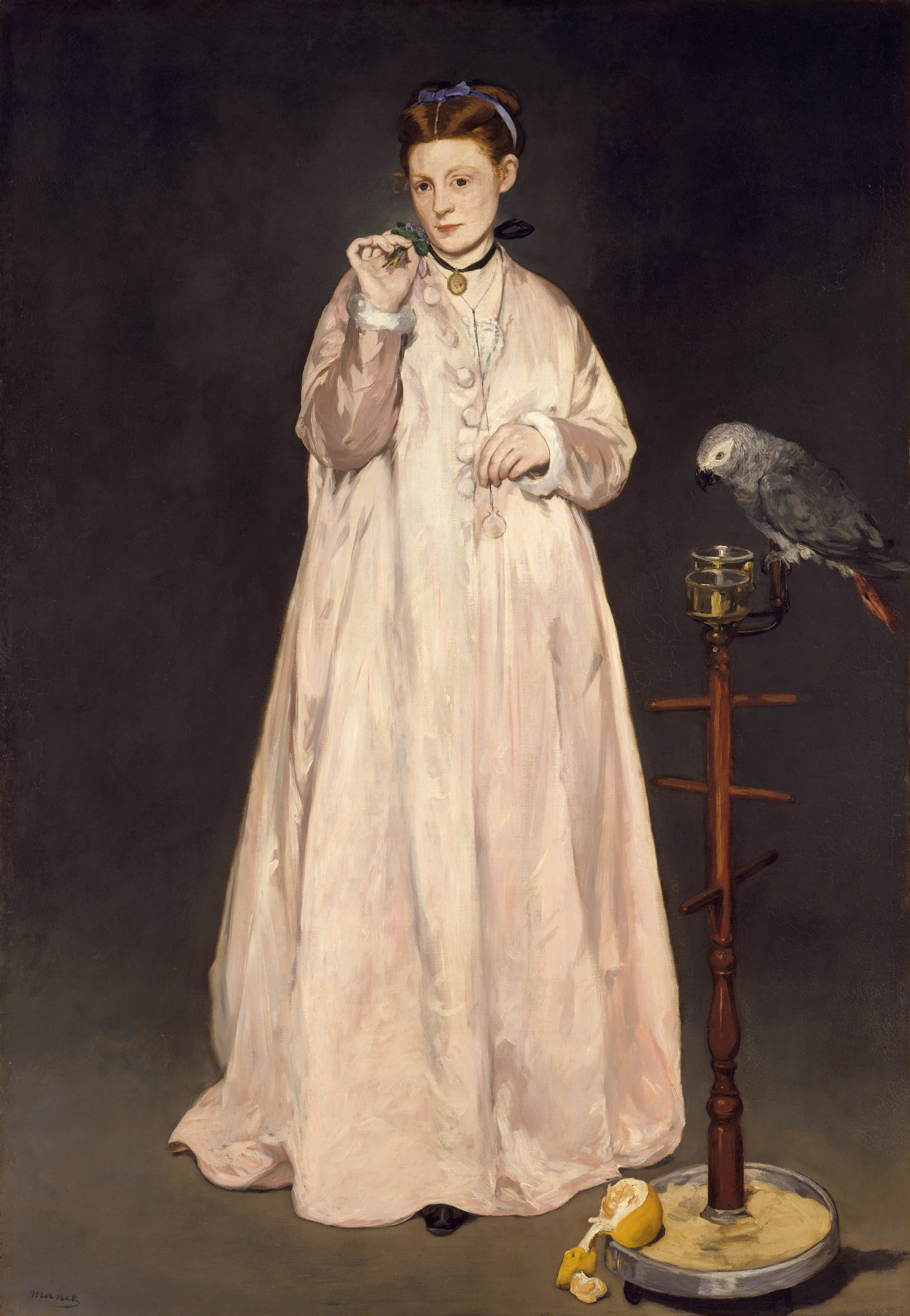
  Édouard Manet, Donna con pappagallo, 1866
- The Croquet Game, executed in 1873 by Édouard Manet currently in the collection of the Städel Museum.
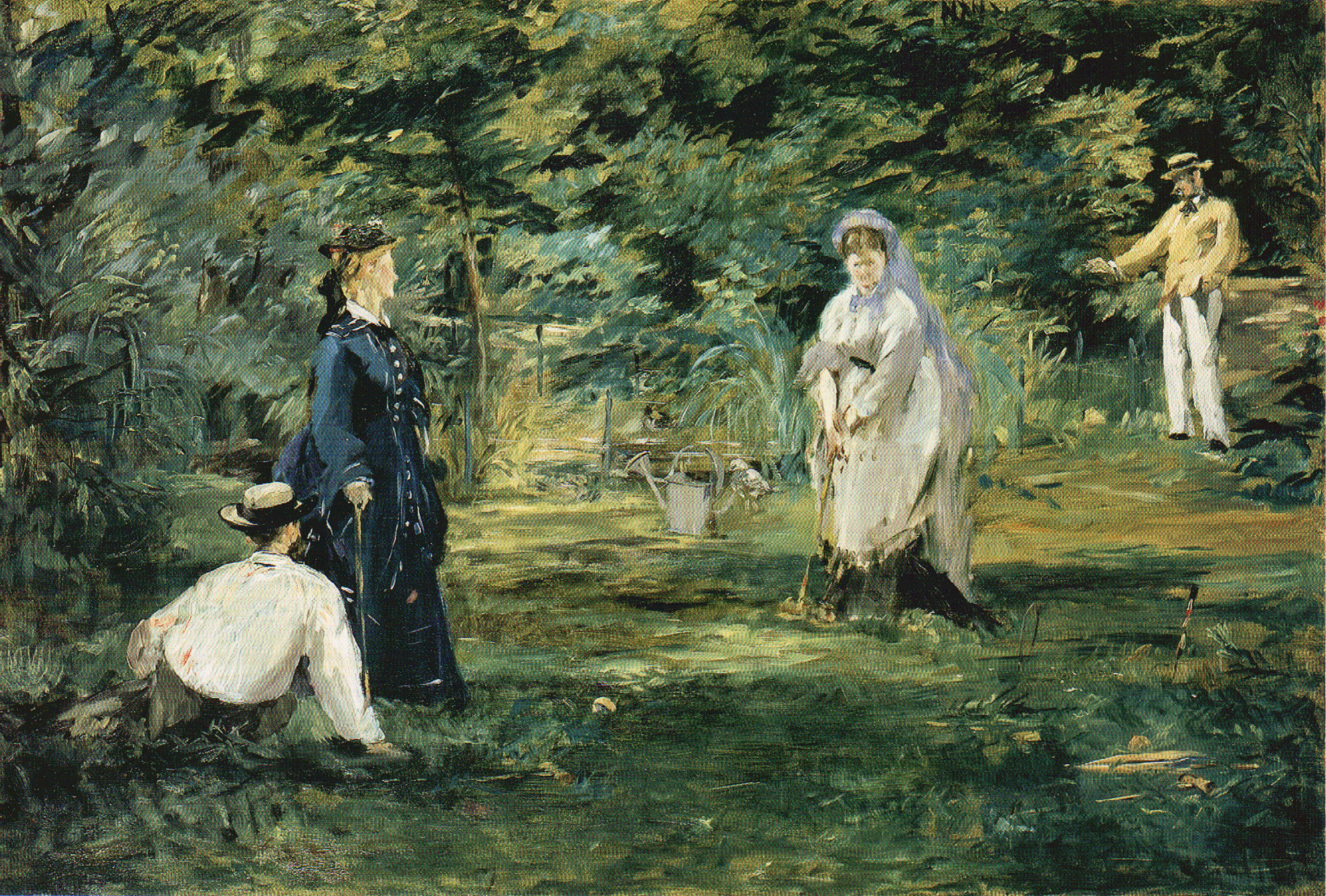
  Édouard Manet, The Croquet Game, 1873
- Swallows, 1873 by Édouard Manet in the Collezione Bührle a Zurigo.
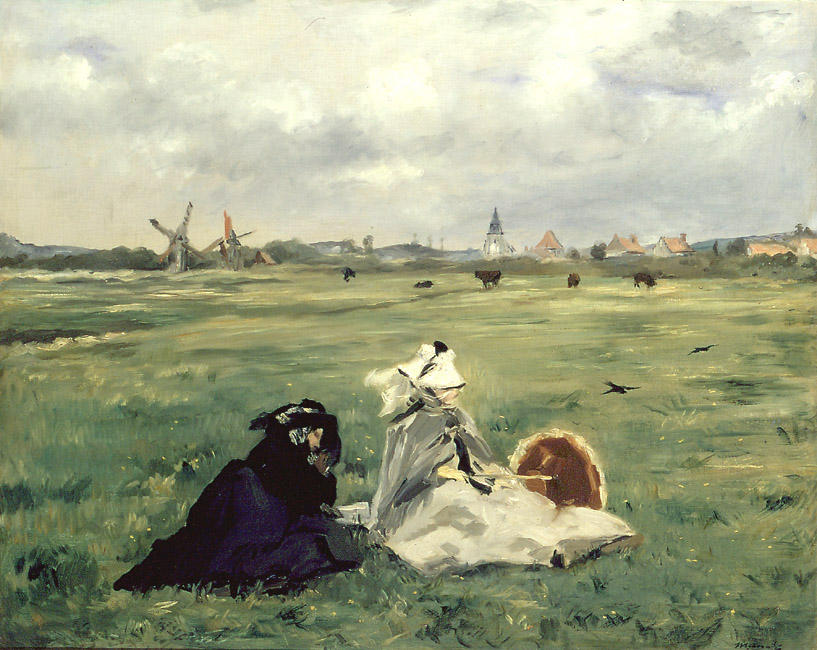
  Édouard Manet, Swallows, 1873
- Fuga di Rochefort, executed in 1881 by Édouard Manet currently in the collection of the Museo d'Orsay.
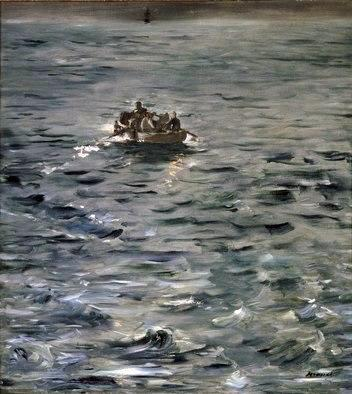
  Édouard Manet, The Escape of Rochefort (1880-81) Museo d'Orsay di Paris

=== Corot ===
- L'odalisque Sicilienne, executed by Jean-Baptiste Camille Corot in 1872.
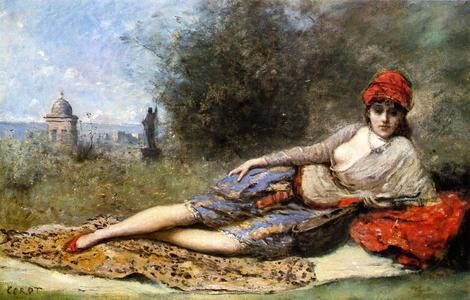
  Jean-Baptiste Camille Corot, L'odalisque Sicilienne Corot, 1872
- Souvenir of the Environs of Lake Nemi, executed by Jean-Baptiste Camille Corot in 1865 currently in the collection of the Art Institute of Chicago.

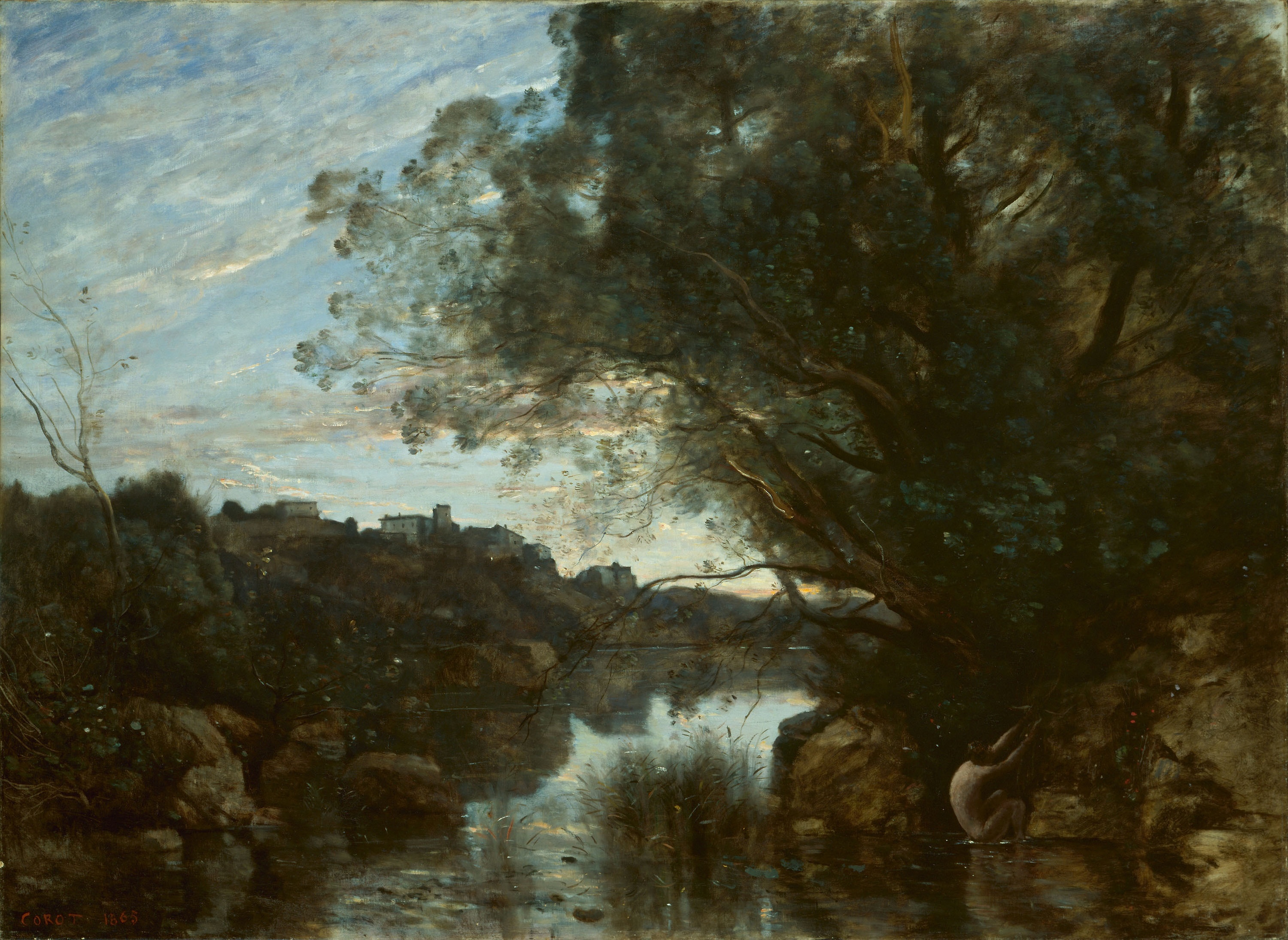
Jean-Baptiste Camille Corot, Souvenir of the Environs of Lake Nemi, 1865

=== Monet ===
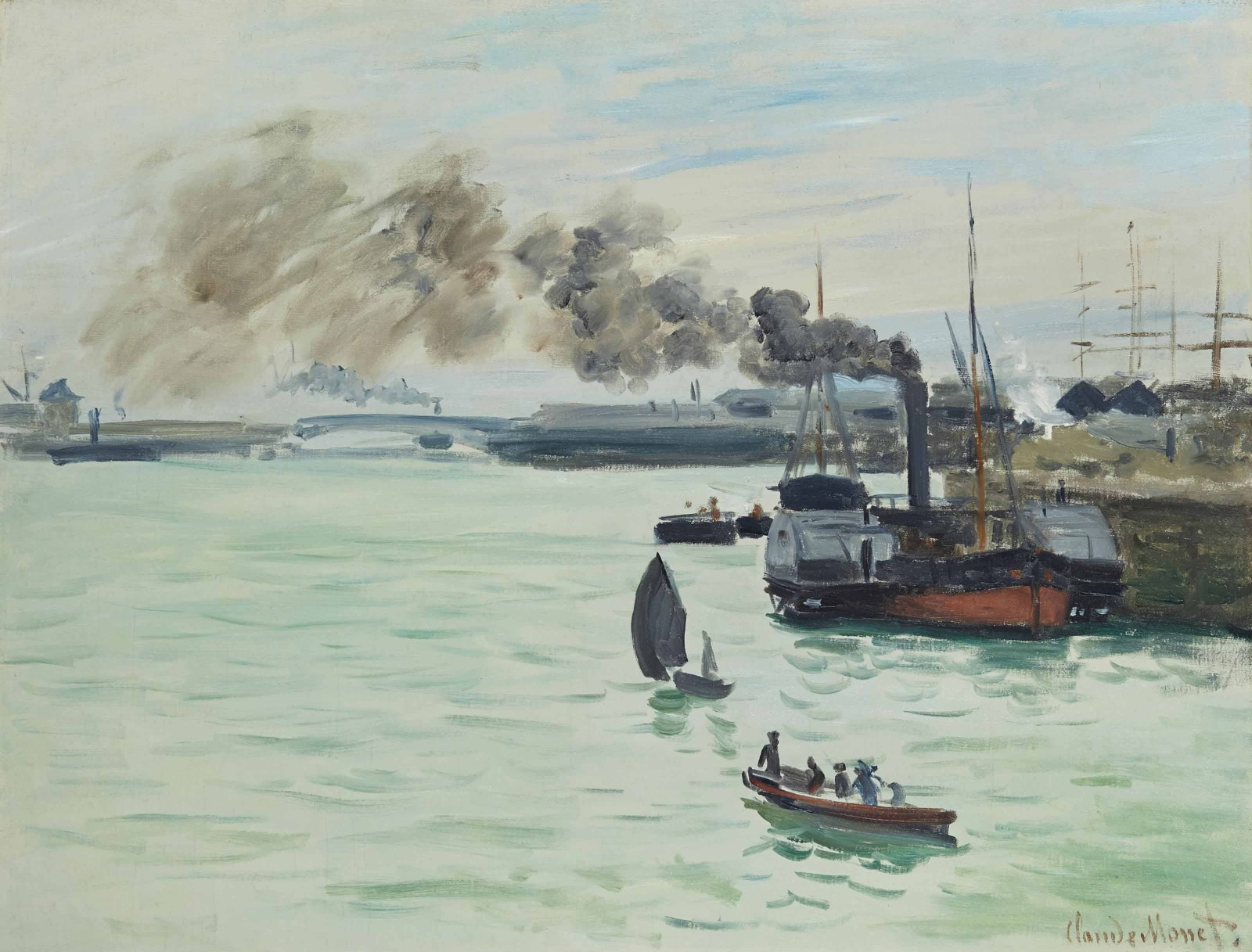
Claude Monet, Vista di un porto, 1871

- Barche in porto di Londra, executed by Claude Monet in 1881 currently in a private collection.

=== Fragonard ===
- The Procuress, executed in 1770 by Jean-Honoré Fragonard currently at Fondazione Jan Krugier.

=== Degas ===
- Il Balletto dell'Opera di Parigi, executed by Edgar Degas in 1877 currently at Art Institute of Chicago.

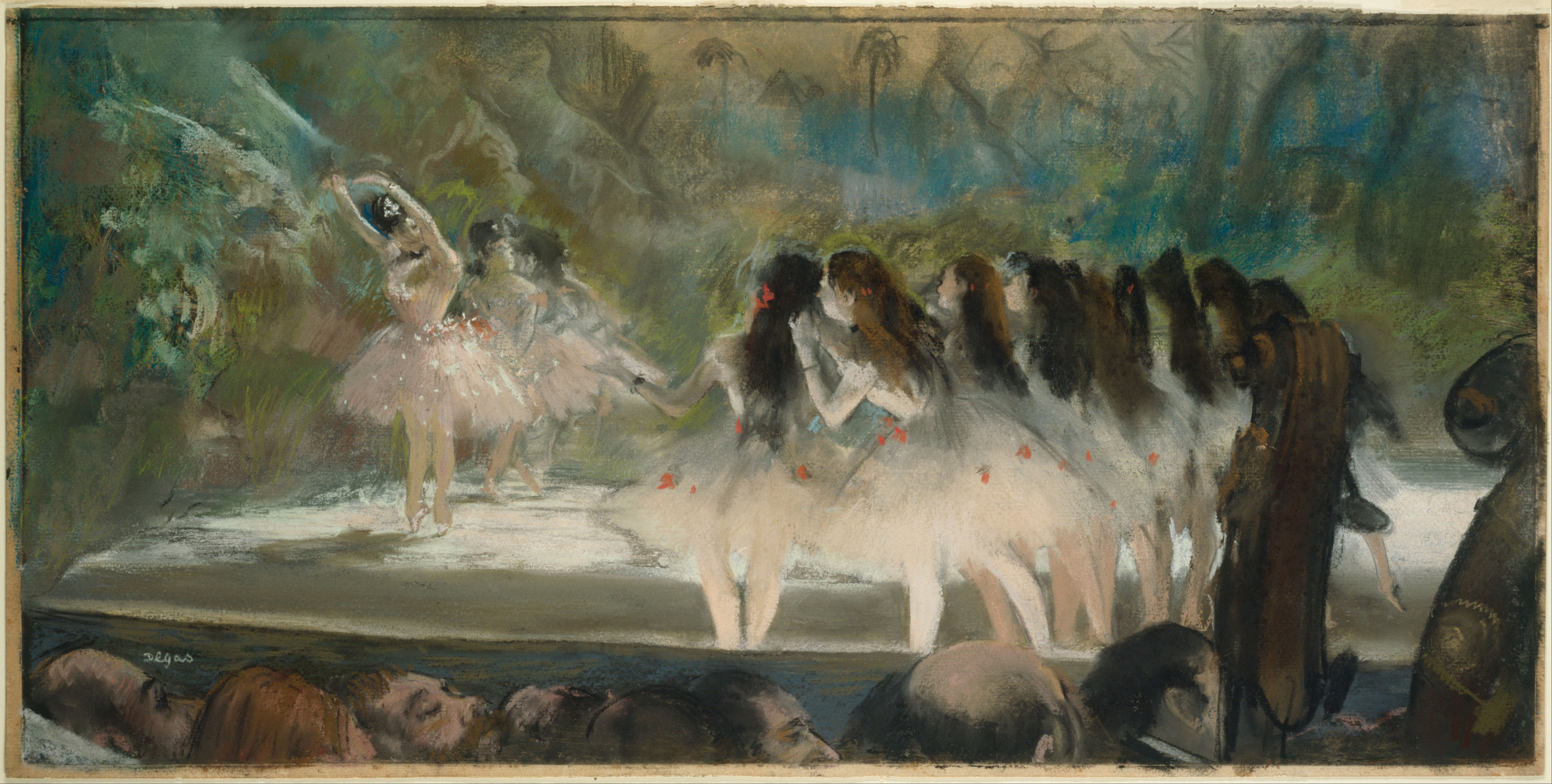
Edgar Degas, Il balletto dell'Opera di Parigi, 1877

=== Sisley ===
- Il lavatoio di Bougival, executed in 1877 by Alfred Sisley currently in a private collection.
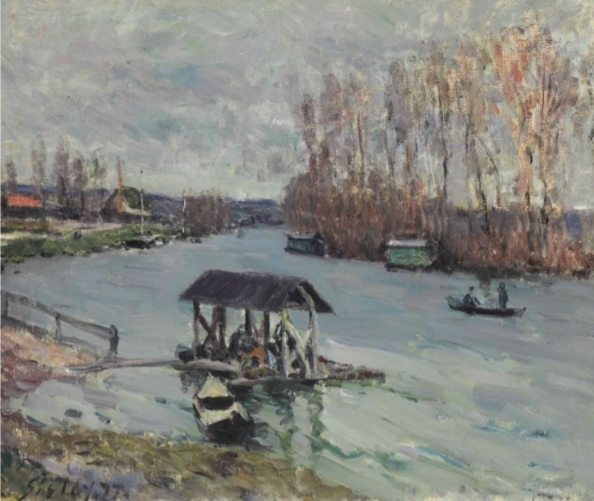
  Alfred Sisley, Il Lavatoio di Bougival, 1877

=== Hervier ===
- Donna che raccoglie un legno spezzato, executed in 1855 by Adolphe Hervier currently at Musée des Beaux-Arts de Dijon.

== Bibliography ==
- "Les Pontremoli, deux dynasties rabbiniques en Turquie et en Italie" Parigi, 1997
