= The Croquet Game =

1873 painting by Édouard Manet

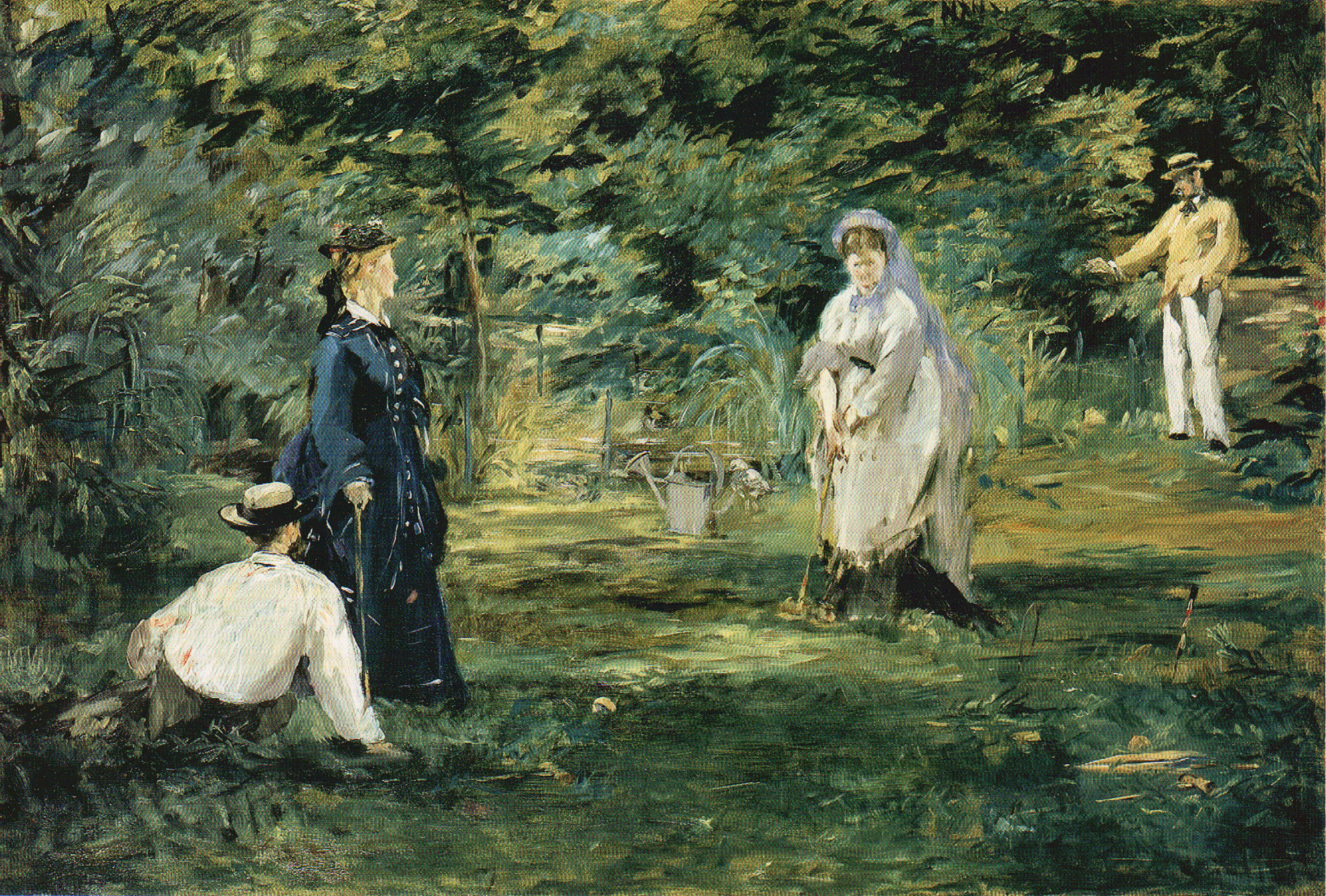
- Artist: Édouard Manet
- Year: 1873
- Type: Oil paint on canvas
- Dimensions: 72 by 106 centimetres (28 in × 42 in)
- Location: Städel Museum; Frankfurt

The Croquet Game (French: 'La Partie de Croquet') is an 1873 oil on canvas painting by Édouard Manet, now in the Städel Museum in Frankfurt. It shows a group of people playing croquet, a very fashionable game at that time. The group comprises the painter Alfred Stevens, artists' models Victorine Meurent and Alice Lecouvé and, in the background, Manet's friend Paul Roudier.

This painting was bought by the impressionist art collector Albert Hecht. After his death the paint passed to his daughter Suzanne Hecht Pontremoli.

In style this painting represented Manet's closest approach to impressionism.

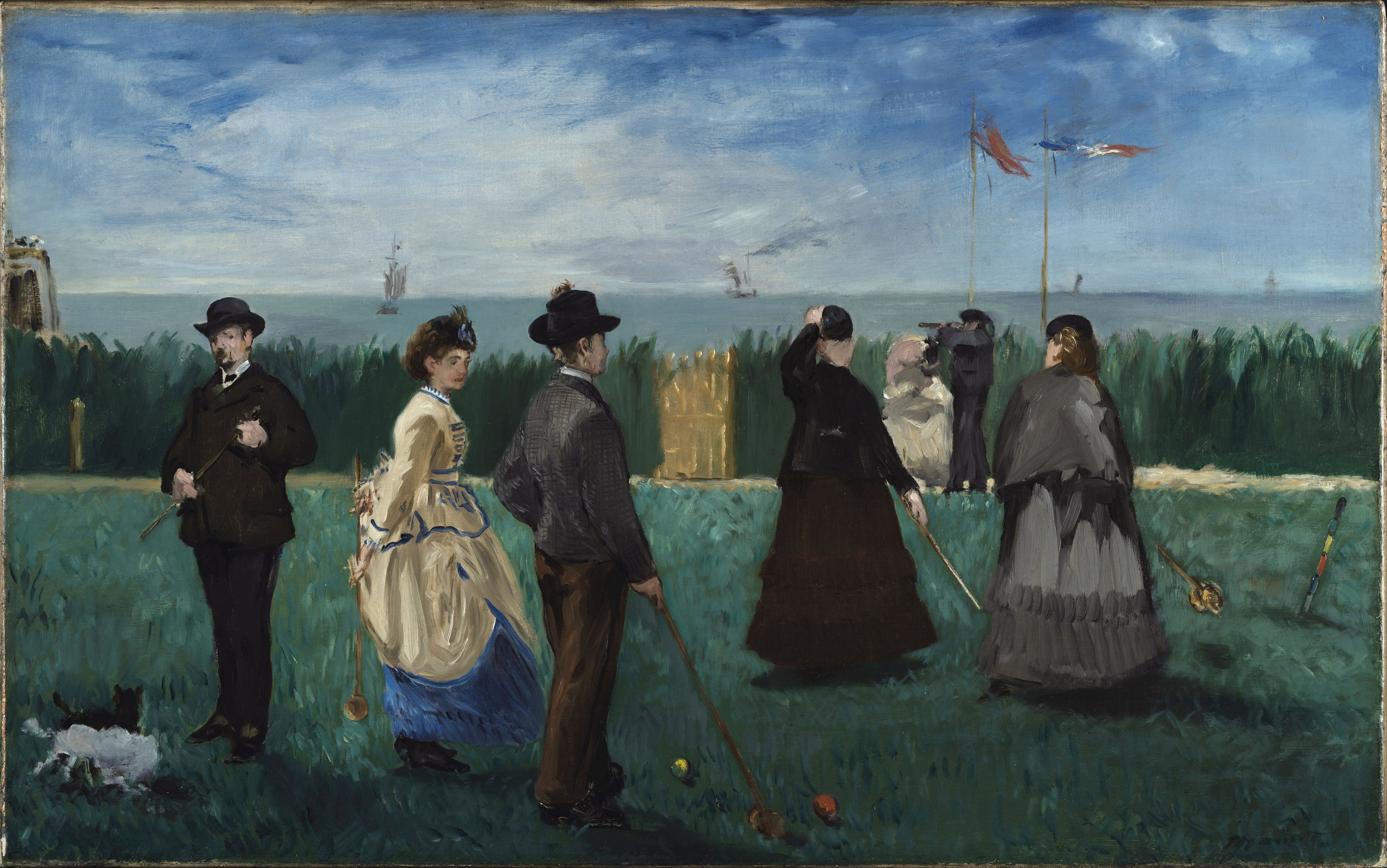
Croquet at Boulogne, 1871. Nelson-Atkins Museum of Art, Kansas City

In 1871, Manet had painted another work with the same name — La partie de croquet — which has been translated as Croquet at Boulogne and, in Manet: A Model Family, as The Croquet Party. In Manet: A Model Family, Aimee Marcereau Degalan identifies the people portrayed, from left to right, as Paul Roudier, Jeanne Gonzalès (the sister of Eva Gonzalès), Léon Leenhoff (Suzanne Manet's son), Marie-Céline Ragut or Eugénie Manet (Manet's mother), and Suzanne Manet (Manet's wife).

The 1879, the painting was purchased from Manet by French painter Gustave Caillebotte. It is now in the Nelson-Atkins Museum of Art in Kansas City, Missouri, which calls it The Croquet Party.

== Classification ==
The Impressionists, including Édouard Manet, dealt intensively with plein air painting. Édouard Manet only took up the special challenge of this painting from 1870, after his artist colleague Berthe Morisot had suggested it. The garden is only shown very briefly. Floral details are missing. Compared to other impressionist plein air paintings, the picture appears static due to its well thought-out depth gradation.

== See also ==
- List of paintings by Édouard Manet
- 1873 in art
