= Michel Pontremoli =

French civil servant and partisan

Personal details
- Profession: intellettuale, funzionario, partigiano

Michel Pontremoli (Paris, 20 February 1908 – Lyon, 1944) was a French civil servant and partisan, an active intellectual and close friend of Francis Ponge, Albert Camus, Jean Hyppolite and Simone de Beauvoir.

== Biography ==
Michel Pontremoli was born in Paris in February 1908 into an upper middle class Jewish family. His father Emmanuel Pontremoli, was one of the most prominent French architects of the time, and Suzanne Hecht Pontremoli, was an art collector and intellectual, related to Marcel Proust.

After his studies, he joined the French Council of State. He corresponded with leading French intellectuals of the time such as Francis Ponge, a close friend, Albert Camus, Jean Hyppolite and Simone de Beauvoir.

When Nazi Germany occupied France in 1940, Pontremoli and his family were persecuted due to their Jewish heritage as well as his communist affiliations. In June 1941, he was expelled from the Council of State, along with Georges Cahen-Salvador, Pierre Larroque, Jean Cahen-Salvador, Alexandre Parodi, Jacques Helbronner, Michel Debré. Pontemoli joined General De Gaulle. Captured by the Gestapo, he was shot in 1944 by the Nazis during the liberation of Lyon.

After his death, a commemorative plaque was dedicated to him in the Palais-Royal, seat of the Council of State.

== Selected works ==
- Michel Pontremoli, La propriété des sources d'énergie, Parigi, 1932
