= Emmanuel Pontremoli =

French architect and archaeologist (1865-1956)

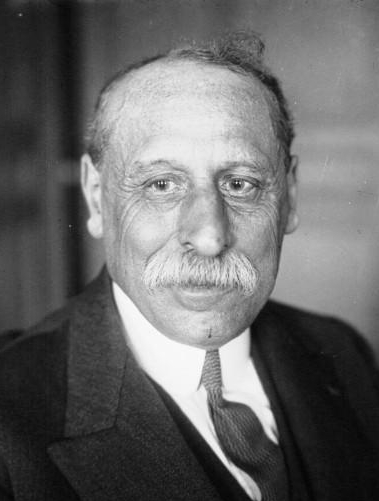
- Emmanuel Pontremoli in 1932
- Born: 13 January 1865; Nice, Alpes-Maritimes, French Empire
- Died: 25 July 1956 (aged 91); Paris, French Republic
- Education: École des Beaux-Arts
- Occupation: Architect
- Awards: Prix de Rome; 1890; Académie des Beaux-Arts; 1922 Seat 7
- Projects: Villa Kerylos (ca.1900)

Emmanuel Pontremoli (13 January 1865 – 25 July 1956) was a French architect and archaeologist.

== Biography ==
Pontremoli was born in Nice, Alpes-Maritimes, to a Jewish family from Piedmont; he studied in the atelier of Louis-Jules André. In 1890, he won the Prix de Rome in the architecture category and in 1922 became a member of the Académie des Beaux Arts. He taught a clinical architecture studio at the Beaux-Arts, alongside André Leconte, a former student and winner of the 1927 Prix de Rome. Pontremoli was appointed director of the Beaux-Arts in 1932 and is credited with shepherding the school, whose name had become synonymous with neoclassicism, into the twentieth century.

Pontremoli is best known for his architectural creation of Villa Kerylos for Théodore and Fanny Reinach at Beaulieu-sur-Mer and for the Institute for Human Paleontology in Paris for Albert I, Prince of Monaco.

== Family ==
In 1899, he married Suzanne Hecht (1876-1956), with whom he had three children: Thérèse (1900-1989), Jean (1902-1940) and Michel (1908-1944).

During the Nazi occupation of France, his sons Michel Pontremoli and Jean Pontremoli enlisted and fought with the French partisan force. In 1944, they both died at the hands of the Nazis.

Pontremoli and his wife collected art. The Avenue Emmanuel Pontremoli in Nice is named in his memory.

== Gallery ==
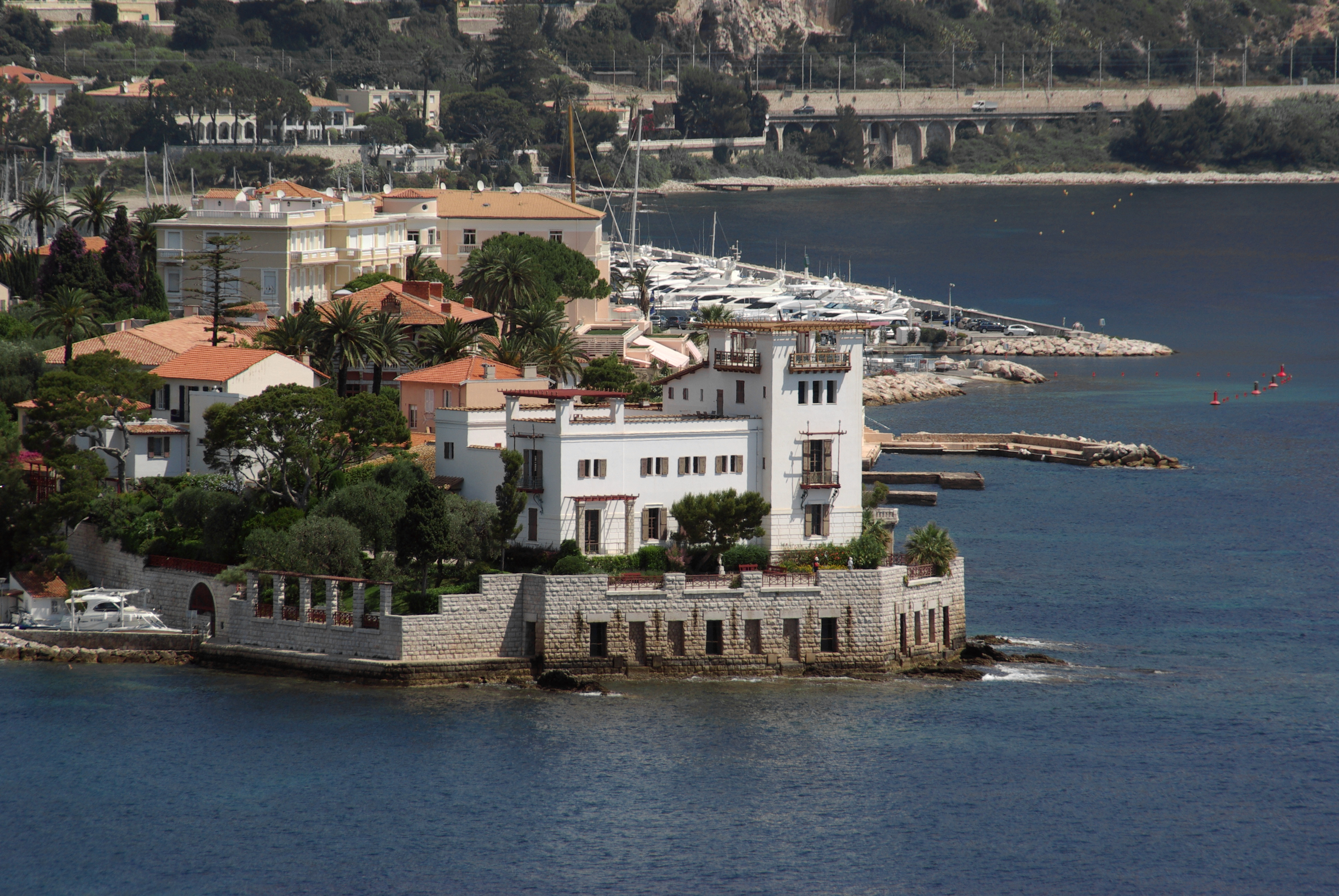
Villa Kérylos, Beaulieu-sur-Mer

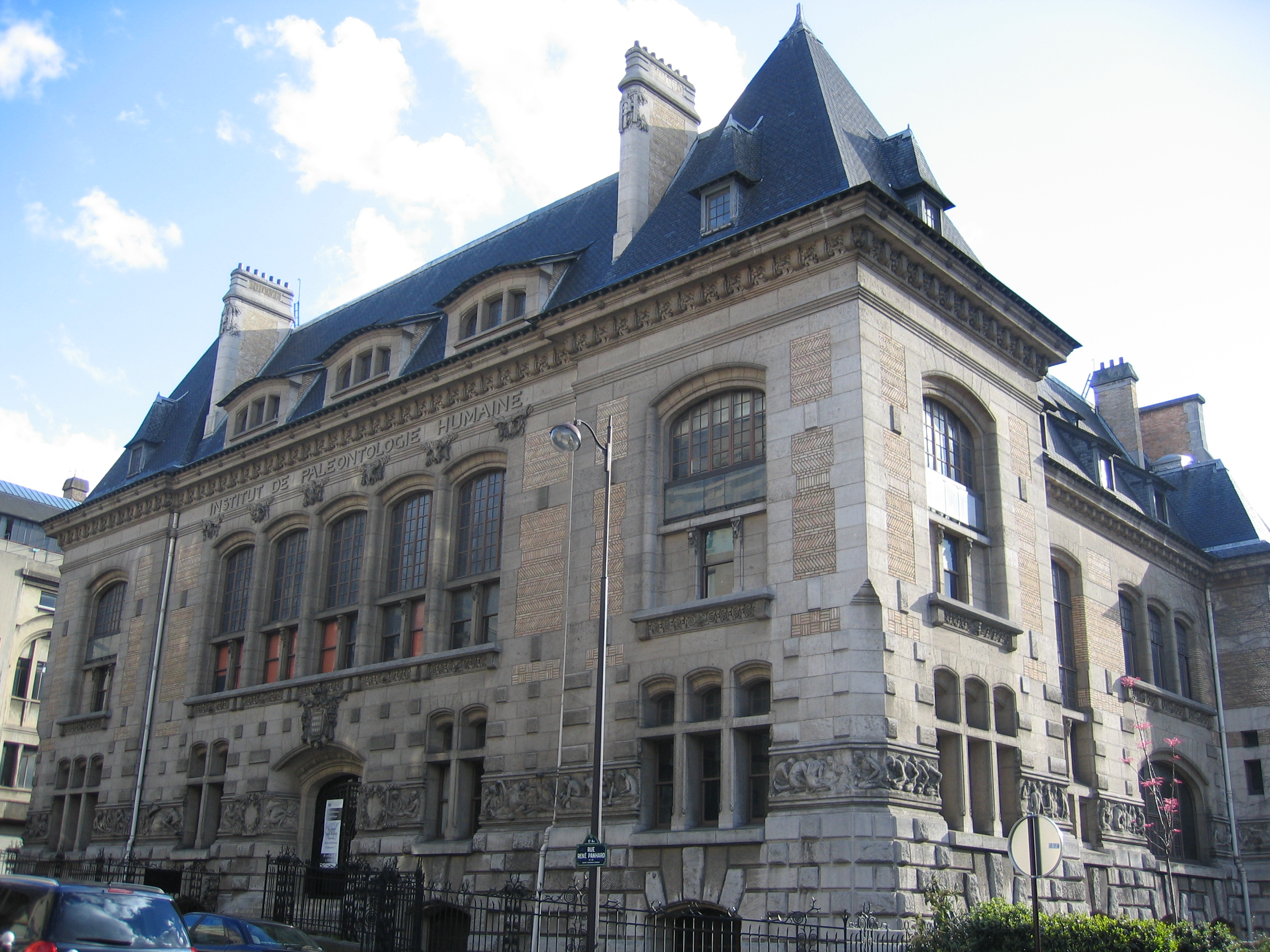
Institute for Human Paleontology, Paris
