= Woman with a Parrot (Courbet) =

Painting by Gustave Courbet

La Femme au perroquet (Woman with a Parrot)
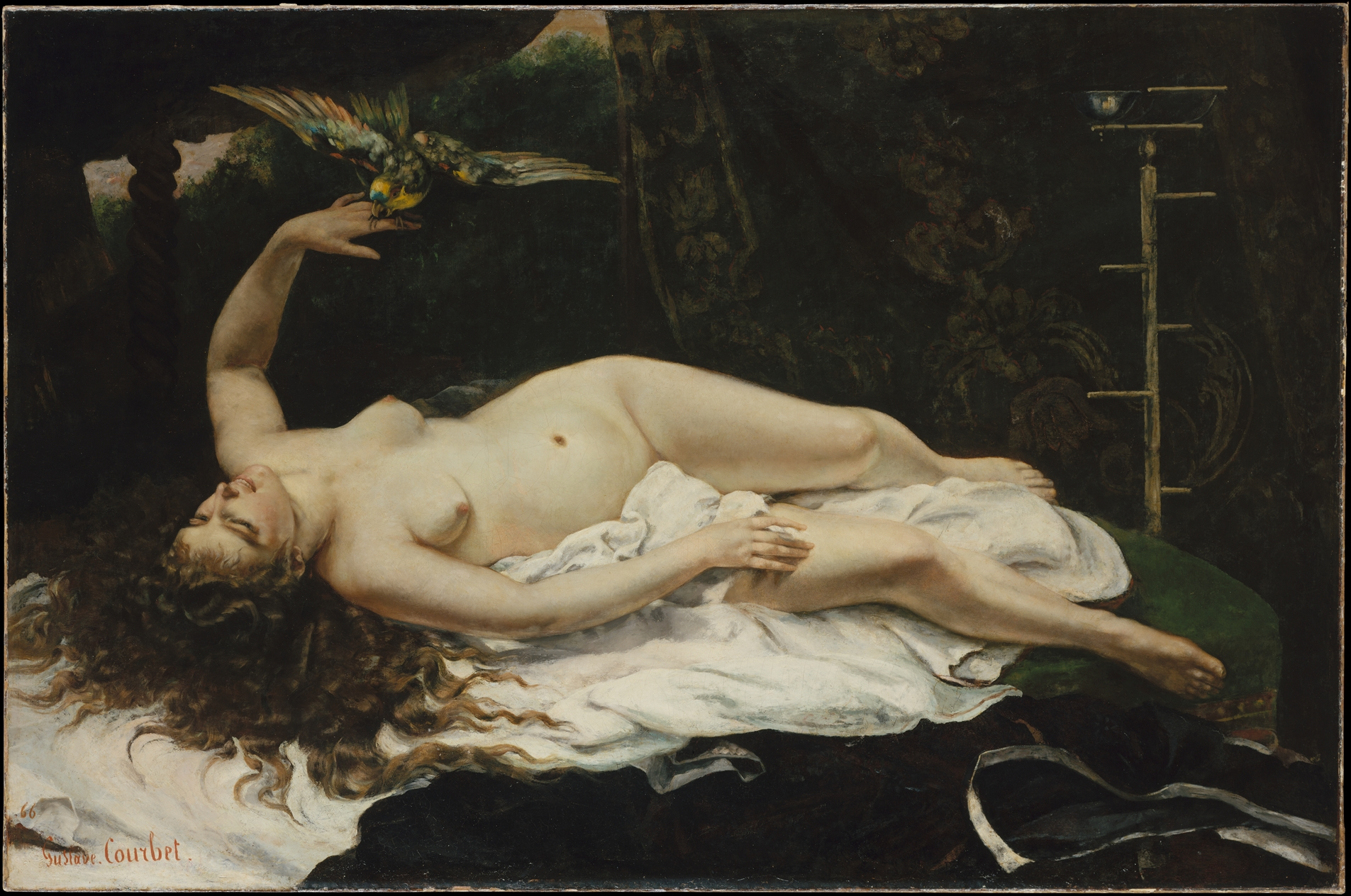
- Artist: Gustave Courbet
- Year: 1866
- Medium: Oil on canvas
- Dimensions: 129.5 cm × 195.6 cm (51.0 in × 77.0 in)
- Location: Metropolitan Museum of Art, New York, United States
- Accession: 29.100.57

La Femme au perroquet (Woman with a Parrot) is an oil painting on canvas by French Realist painter Gustave Courbet. It was the first nude by the artist to be accepted by the Paris Salon in 1866 after a previous entry in 1864 was rejected as indecent. It is in the collection of the Metropolitan Museum of Art in New York City.

== Description ==
The painting shows a woman reclining on her back, with a pet parrot alighting on an outstretched hand. While painted in a style to gain Academy acceptance in its pose and smooth flesh tones, the model's discarded clothes and disheveled hair were controversial, although less so than Le Sommeil, painted the same year. Joanna Hiffernan likely posed for both paintings, as she did for others by Courbet.

The work is on view in the Metropolitan Museum's Gallery 811.
