= A Young Lady in 1866 =

1866 painting by Édouard Manet

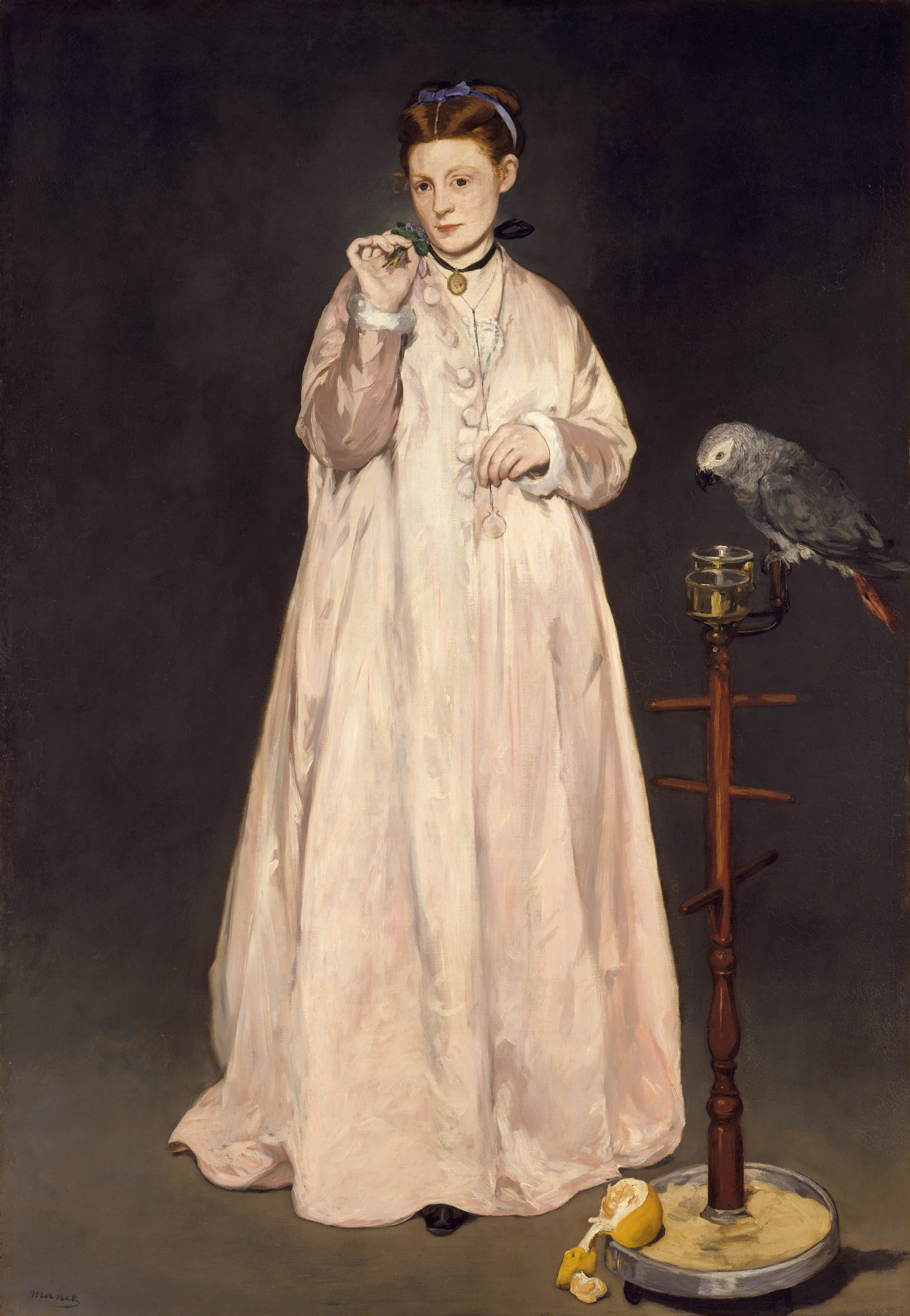
- Artist: Édouard Manet
- Year: 1866
- Medium: oil on canvas
- Dimensions: 185.1 cm × 128.6 cm (72.9 in × 50.6 in)
- Location: Metropolitan Museum of Art; New York

A Young Lady in 1866 or Lady with a Parrot is an 1866 painting by Édouard Manet, showing his favourite model, Victorine Meurent, wearing a long pink peignoir, holding a small bouquet of violets, and accompanied by an African grey parrot. It is an oil painting on canvas measuring 185.1 x 128.6 cm, and is now in the Metropolitan Museum of Art in New York. It and Boy Carrying a Sword (also in the Met) were the first of Manet's works to enter a gallery collection.

It was first exhibited in the May 1867 exhibition of his works on the Avenue de l'Alma (now the Avenue George-V) in Paris as catalogue number 15, with the title Jeune dame en 1866. At the 1868 Paris Salon, the work's realism and inclusion of a parrot was reminiscent of Gustave Courbet's 1866 Woman with a Parrot (Metropolitan Museum of Art), a nude that had caused a scandal at that year's Salon. Manet's work was similarly criticised, and the public came to nickname it Lady with a Parrot, although it had been exhibited as Lady in Pink, then as A Young Lady or Young Lady in 1866.

== Provenance ==
Manet sold it to the art dealer Durand-Ruel in January 1872 for 1500 francs. He in turn sold it on to the textile magnate, art collector and friend of Claude Monet Ernest Hoschedé five years later for 2,000 or 2,500 francs. Hoschedé sold it at the hôtel Drouot on 6 June 1878 for 700 francs to Henri Hecht. It then returned to Durand-Ruel, who sold it to J. Alden Weir on behalf of Erwin Davis in 1881. Davis in turn sold it as Feeding the Parrot through the dealer John Ortgies in a sale on 19 and 20 March 1889 in New York and bought it back for $1,350.

It was donated the Metropolitan Museum, together with Manet's Boy Carrying a Sword and Jules Bastien-Lepage's Joan of Arc, by Erwin Davis in a letter to the president of its paintings committee on 21 March 1889.

== See also ==
- List of paintings by Édouard Manet

== Bibliography ==
- Philippe Bonnefis, Mesures de l'ombre : Baudelaire, Flaubert, Laforgue et Verne, Presses universitaires de Lille, coll. « Objet », 1987 (ISBN 2-85939-302-1)
- Théodore Duret (1838–1927), Histoire d'Édouard Manet et de son œuvre, Nabu Press, 7 décembre 2013, 402 p., broché (ISBN 978-1295354252 et 129535425X)
- Émile Zola (édition présentée et établie par Jean-Pierre Leduc-Adine), Pour Manet, éditions Complexe, coll. « Le Regard littéraire », 1989 (ISBN 2-87027-306-1, ASIN B003BPKOWA)
