= Rochefort's Escape =

Painting by Édouard Manet

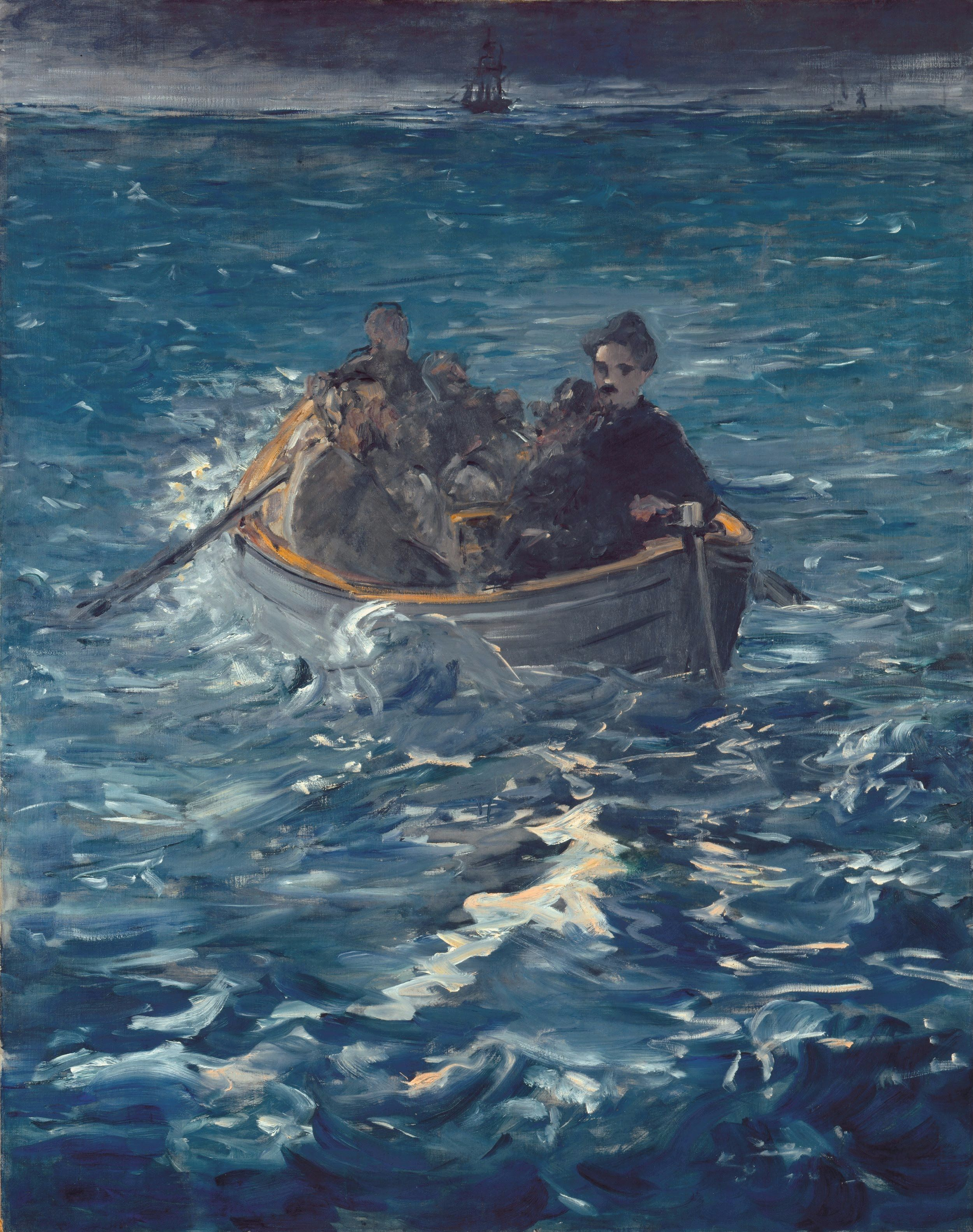
- Year: c. 1881
- Medium: Oil on canvas
- Dimensions: 143 cm × 114 cm (56 in × 45 in)
- Location: Kunsthaus Zürich, Zürich

Rochefort's Escape (French: L'évasion de Rochefort) is a painting by Édouard Manet painted in around 1881, currently in the Kunsthaus Zürich. It depicts the 1874 escape of Victor Henri Rochefort, Marquis de Rochefort-Luçay from captivity in New Caledonia to which he had been sentenced for his role in the Paris Commune. The genre of history painting traditionally dealt with historic and mythological topics, and Rochefort's Escape is considered highly significant for its depiction of an event still fresh in public memory. A second smaller version of the painting is in the Musée d'Orsay.

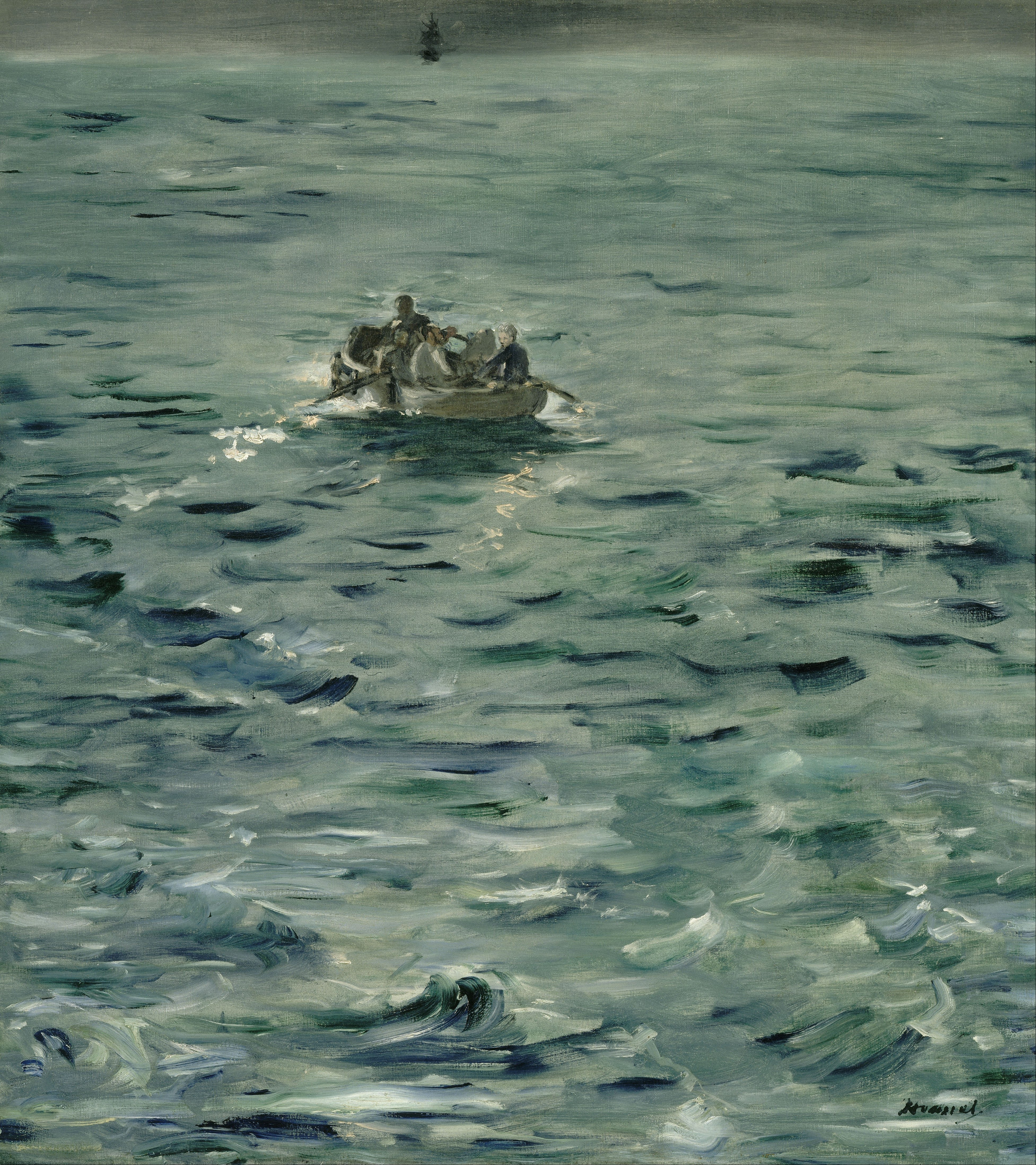
Rochefort's Escape (c. 1881), oil on canvas, 80 x 73 cm. Musée d'Orsay.

== See also ==
- List of paintings by Édouard Manet
