= Bullfight, or Novillada at El Escorial =

Oil on canvas painting by Alfred Dehodencq {1849-1850)

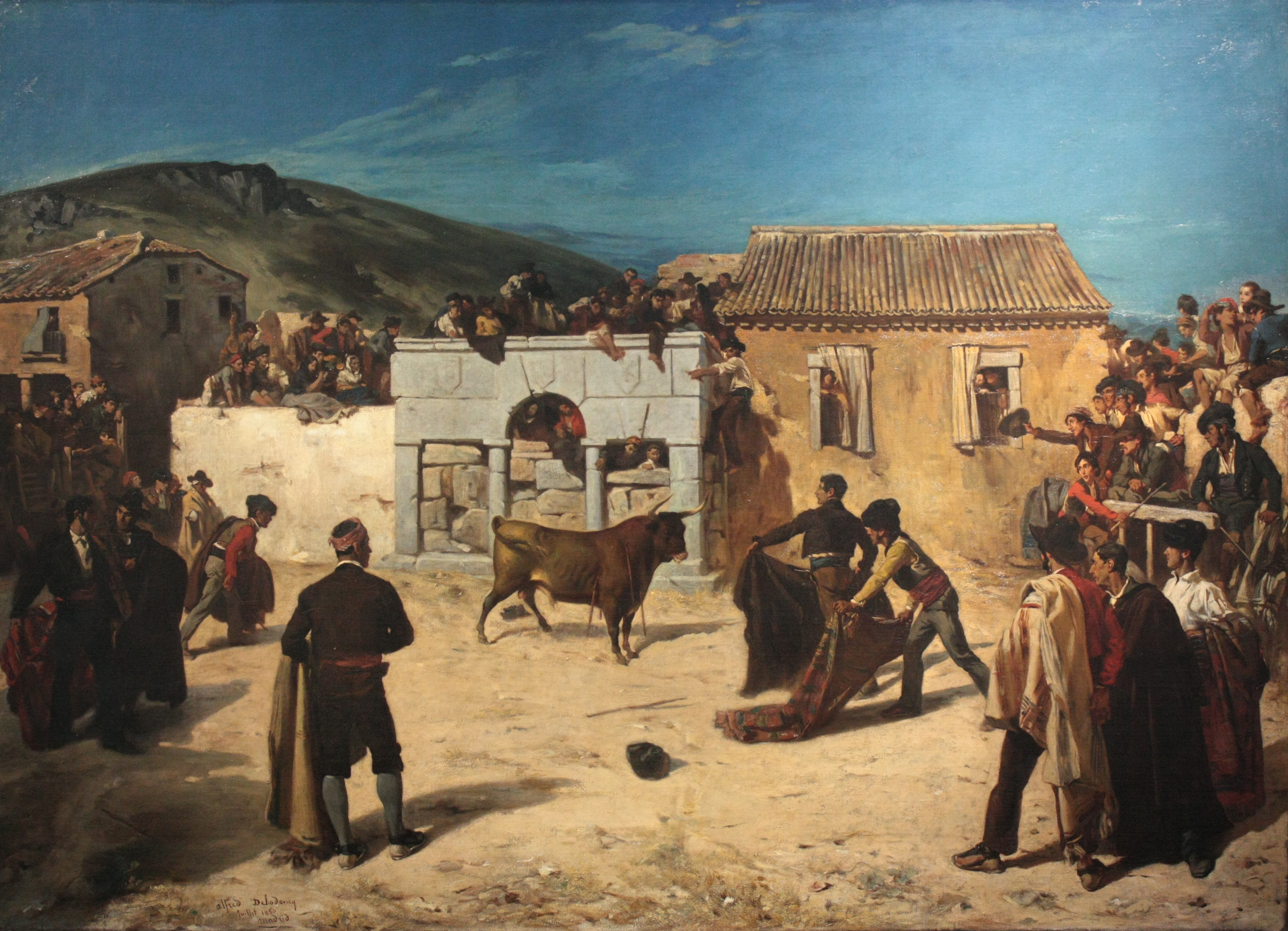
Bullfight, or Novillada at El Escorial (1849-1850) by Alfred Dehodencq

Bullfight, or Novillada at El Escorial (French - Course de taureaux ou Novillada à l'Escurial) is an 1849-1850 oil on canvas painting by Alfred Dehodencq, produced during a fourteen-year stay in Spain and now in the Musée des beaux-arts de Pau.

Dehodencq was mainly a history painter before crossing Spain en route to Morocco. He arrived on the Iberian peninsula in 1849, intending to visit Madrid, and stayed until 1863, sending paintings back to France, which had great success. Bullfight was one of them and had a major impact on Édouard Manet, who was even suspected for a time of painting "after Dehodencq" since their styles and their choice of bullfights as a subject were so close, particularly in Manet's 1865 Bullfight – Death of the Bull and 1866 Bullfight.

Manet had long been prepared to be fascinated by bullfights. From Antonin Proust we know that one of the modern paintings, then exhibited at the Musée du Luxembourg, that interested him the most was Bullfight by Alfred Dehodencq.

Dehodencq enjoyed minor bullfight arenas over those of Madrid, thanks to their sites in the middle of villages on small squares surrounded by houses with ruins from the 1808 French invasion. He does not show a victim.

Dehodencq formed part of the Duke of Montpensier's circle of French artists in Spain, producing other lesser-known works on bullfighting, notably drawings and sketches. His second most famous painting is Bohemians Returning from a Festival in Andalucia which won the gold medal at the 1853 Paris Salon and is now in the town museum at Chaumont (Haute-Marne)

== Bibliography (in French) ==
- Bérard, Robert (2003). oui (ed.). Histoire et dictionnaire de la Tauromachie. Paris: Bouquins Laffont. ISBN 2-221-09246-5.
- Martinez-Novillo, Alvaro (1988). Le Peintre et la Tauromachie. Paris: Flammarion.
- Cachin, Françoise; Moffett, Charles S.; Wilson-Bareau, Juliet (1983). Manet: 1832-1883 (in French). Paris: Réunion des Musées Nationaux. ISBN 2-7118-0230-2.
