= Bullfight – Death of the Bull =

Painting by Édouard Manet

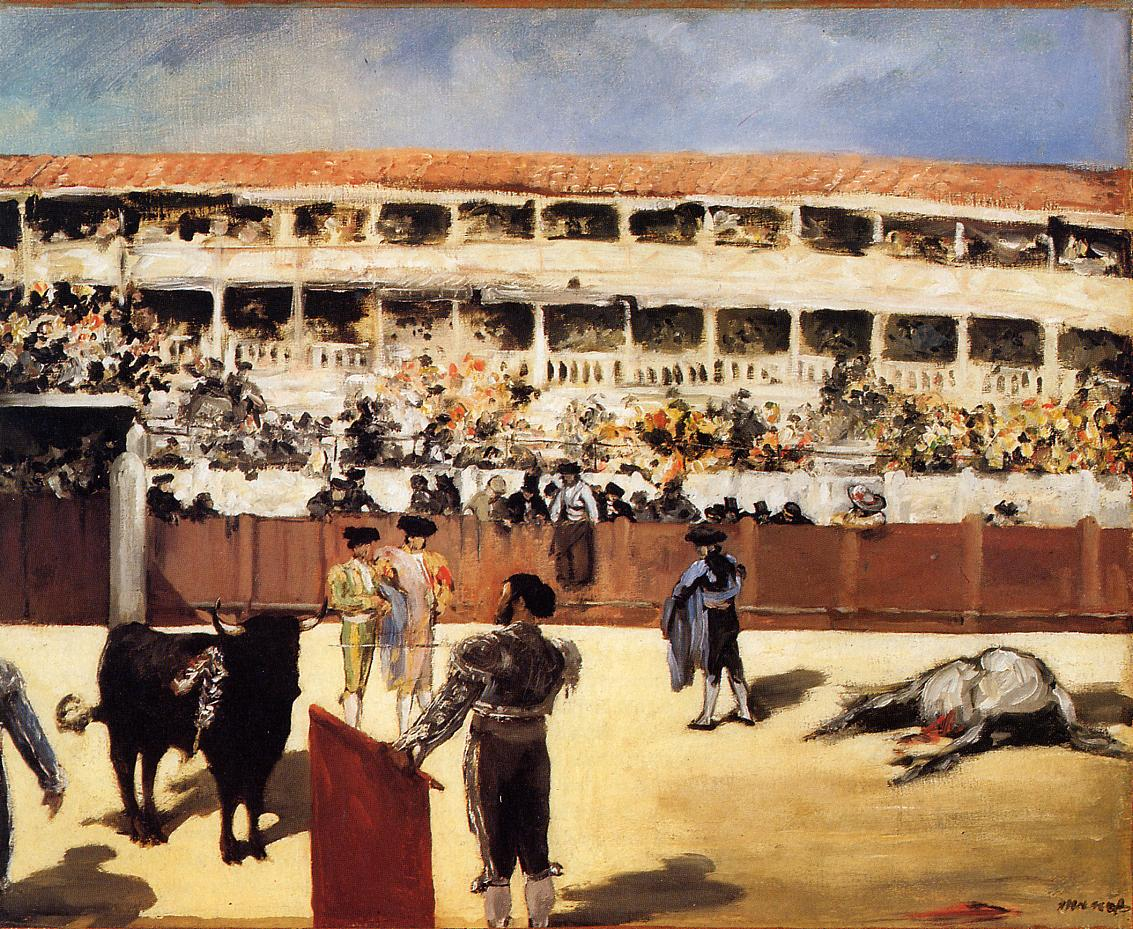
- Artist: Édouard Manet
- Year: 1865
- Medium: oil on canvas
- Dimensions: 48 cm × 60.4 cm (19 in × 23.8 in)
- Location: Art Institute of Chicago; Chicago, Illinois

Bullfight – Death of the Bull (French: Corrida : la mort du taureau) is an oil on canvas painting by Édouard Manet, executed c. 1865. It is now in the Art Institute of Chicago.

With Bullfight (now known as The Fall of the Bullfighter, Musée d'Orsay) and The Fall of the Picador (watercolour, private collection), it forms part of a series of works painted after Manet's return from Spain.

== Context ==
Since 1862 Manet had already produced several works on bullfighting – two canvases produced by cutting up Episode in a Bullfight (The Dead Man and The Bullfight), Mademoiselle V. in the Costume of an Espada, and The Matador Saluting.

On his return from Spain, he declared himself greatly impressed by the spectacle of the bullring, and in a letter to Zacharie Astruc, on September 17, 1865, he declared that he intended: "to put on canvas the rapid aspect of this assemblage many colorful people, without forgetting the dramatic part, picador and horse knocked down, plowed by the horns of the furious bull, and the army of chulos trying to ward off the animal".

== See also ==
- List of paintings by Édouard Manet
- The museum's Catalogue entry
