= Autumn (Manet) =

1882 painting by Édouard Manet

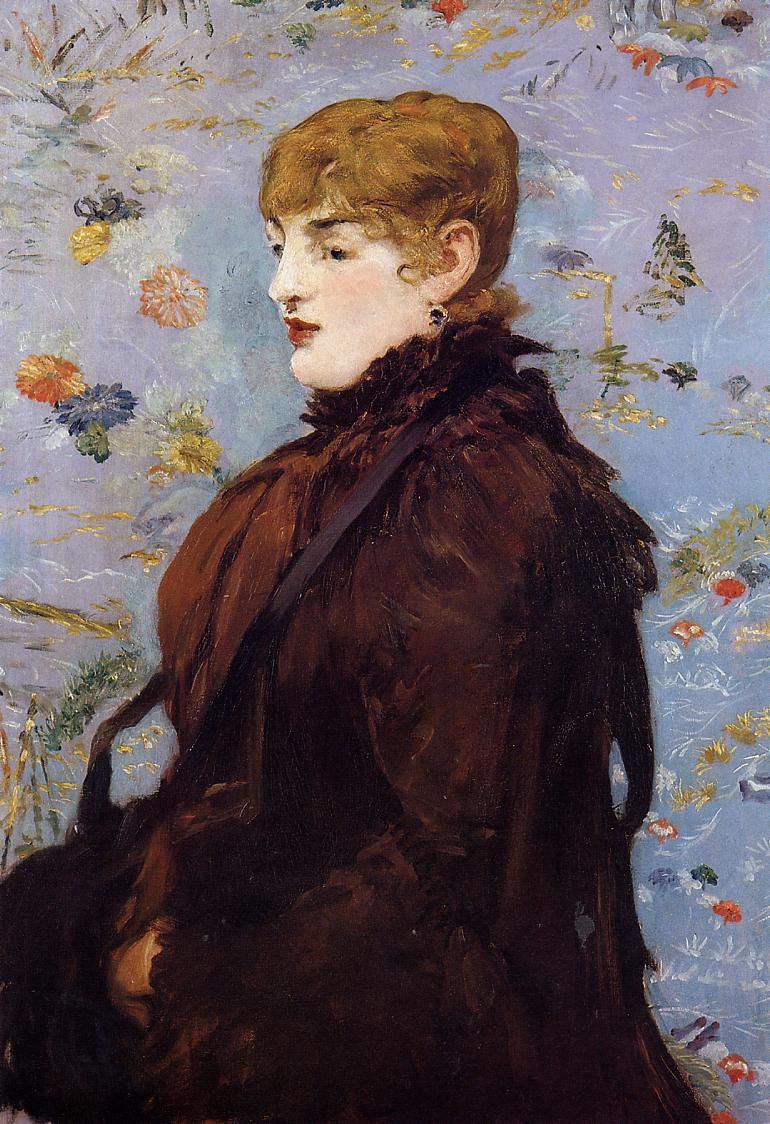
- Artist: Édouard Manet
- Year: 1882
- Medium: oil on canvas
- Dimensions: 73 cm × 51 cm (29 in × 20 in)
- Location: Museum of Fine Arts of Nancy, Nancy, France

Autumn is an oil on canvas painting by Édouard Manet, executed in 1882, now in the Musée des Beaux-arts de Nancy.

The work resulted of an order made by Antonin Proust to Manet to create four paintings on the theme of the Four Seasons, but the painter only had time to make two, this one and Spring, before dying.

The model Méry Laurent wears a fur coat and appears in profile, in a similar way to the portraits of the Italian Renaissance. Placed in front of a Japanese fabric, the blue of it and the brown of her clothing brings out the pink of her complexion.

The model herself bought this work by 1550 francs in 1884, after the artist's death; this one bequeaths the painting to the Museum of Fine Arts in Nancy, her birthplace, making this painting the first by Manet to enter a provincial museum.

== See also ==
- List of paintings by Édouard Manet
- 1882 in art
