= Flowers in a Crystal Vase =

C, 1882 painting by Édouard Manet

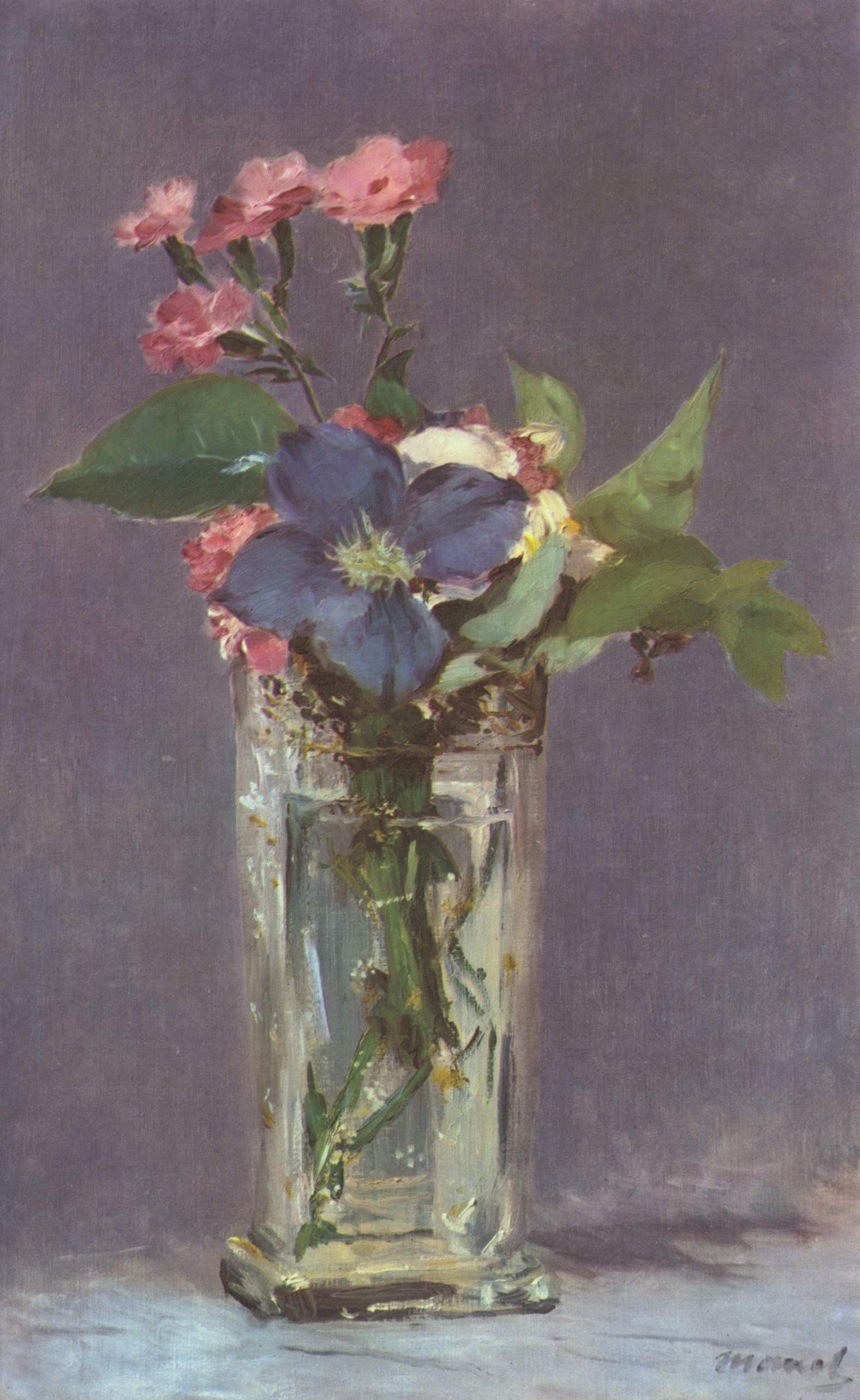
- Artist: Édouard Manet
- Year: 1882
- Medium: oil on canvas
- Dimensions: 32 cm × 24 cm (13 in × 9.4 in)
- Location: Musée d'Orsay, Paris (France)

Flowers in a Crystal Vase (French - Œillets et clématites dans un vase de cristal) is an 1882 painting by Édouard Manet, in the Musée d'Orsay in Paris since 1986. It shows clematis and 'oeillets', a French word used for several kinds of cut flowers, many from the Dianthus genus. It was probably executed in July 1882 at Rueil and forms part of a set of still life paintings produced by Manet at the end of his life, mainly showing flowers.

== See also ==
- List of paintings by Édouard Manet
- 1882 in art
