= Madame Manet at the Piano =

Painting by Édouard Manet

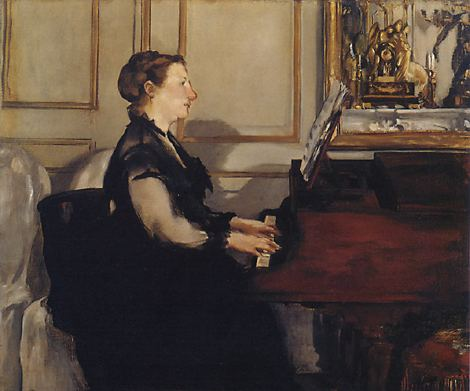
- Artist: Édouard Manet
- Year: 1867–1868
- Medium: Oil on canvas
- Location: Musée d'Orsay; Paris

Madame Manet at the Piano is a portrait by Édouard Manet of his wife Suzanne (née Leenhoff), painted in 1867–68 and now in the Musée d'Orsay, in Paris. It highlights her talent on the piano; she had played Wagner to Baudelaire during his last days.

== Presentation ==
In 1849 Manet's father appointed Suzanne Leenhoff as piano teacher for his sons. She was a gifted interpreter of composers such as Schumann and Richard Wagner. When the poet Charles Baudelaire suffered a stroke in 1866 and ended up in a Paris hospital, she offered him a distraction by playing Wagner. A love affair developed between Leenhoff and Manet, which led to their marriage in 1863.

In 1868, Edgar Degas had made a painting of the Manet couple with Suzanne at the piano and her husband listening on the couch. Degas gave the canvas to Manet as a present. However, Manet was so incensed with the way his wife had been painted that he cut off the part of the canvas portraying her. Then, in Madame Manet at the Piano, he painted "his own, more flattering, depiction of her". Suzanne Manet wears a black dress in this painting. Manet chose a relatively high vantage point for this painting so that her hands are clearly visible. In the top right corner a small still life is visible in the mirror, including a clock and a pair of candlesticks, lending depth and vibrancy to the flat background.

Diana Seave Greenwald writes that Madame Manet at the Piano "bears a striking resemblance to Whistler's At the Piano", which Manet had seen.

== See also ==
- List of paintings by Édouard Manet
