= The Funeral (painting) =

c. 1870 painting by Édouard Manet

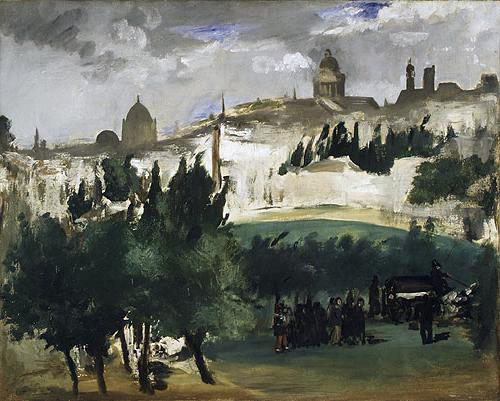
- Artist: Édouard Manet
- Year: 1867–1870
- Medium: oil on canvas
- Dimensions: 72.7 cm × 90.5 cm (28.6 in × 35.6 in)
- Location: Metropolitan Museum of Art; New York

The Funeral (French – L'Enterrement) is an 1867–1870 oil on canvas painting by Édouard Manet, now in the Metropolitan Museum of Art in New York. Incomplete, its style is very close to that of Effect of Snow on Petit-Montrouge and The Exposition Universelle of 1867 (Rouart, Widenstein 1975 no. 123). It is also known as Burial at the Glacière (Enterrement à la Glacière), the title given to it in Denis Rouart and Daniel Wildenstein's posthumous inventory of Manet's works.

The work was sold by Suzanne Manet to the art dealer Portier in August 1894 for 300 francs. In 1902 it is recorded as owned by Camille Pissarro, who had known Manet well and frequented the Café Guerbois. The painting was next acquired by Ambroise Vollard, who sold it to its present owner for $2,319.

== Composition and dating ==
It shows a hearse and its attendants at the bottom of the quartier Mouffetard, heading for the Montparnasse Cemetery, with the Observatoire de Paris, église Notre-Dame du Val-de-Grâce, the Panthéon, the bell tower of the église Saint-Étienne-du-Mont and the tour Clovis (now the lycée Henri-IV) in the distance. Charles Sterling-Salinger notes that Manet has brought the domes of the Observatoire of the église Notre-Dame du Val-de-Grâce closer together to improve the composition. According to Adolphe Tabarant, the scene is set in the rue de l'Estrapade. Tabarant initially dated the work to 1870, but later amended this to the earlier date, which he felt more probable. Due to the presence of a horse grenadier of the Imperial Guard at the back of the procession, Henri Loyrette argues that the scene is set before the end of the French Second Empire.

The work was most probably inspired by the funeral of the painter's friend Charles Baudelaire on 2 September 1867, at which Manet had assisted. The weather was stormy that day, the sky heavy and the cortège small because – according to Charles Asselineau – many people were absent from Paris and could not return in time. On their return, about a hundred people were in the church and at the Montparnasse Cemetery.

== See also ==
- List of paintings by Édouard Manet
- The museum's Catalogue entry

== Bibliography ==
- Cachin, Françoise; Moffett, Charles S.; Wilson-Bareau, Juliet (1983). Manet 1832–1883 (in French). Paris: Réunion des musées nationaux. ISBN 2-7118-0230-2.
- Tabarant, Adolphe (1947). Manet et ses œuvres (in French). Paris: Gallimard.
- Tabarant, Adolphe (1930). Les Manet de la collection Havemeyer: La Renaissance de l'art français (in French). Paris.
- Moreau-Nélaton, Étienne (1926). Manet raconté par lui-même (in French). Vol. 2, t. I. Paris: Henri Laurens.
- Loyrette, Henri; Tinterow, Gary, eds. (1994) [1935]. Impressionnisme: Les origines, 1859–1869 (Exhibition catalogue) (in French). Réunion des musées nationaux. ISBN 978-2711828203.
