= The Port of Boulogne by Moonlight =

Painting by Édouard Manet

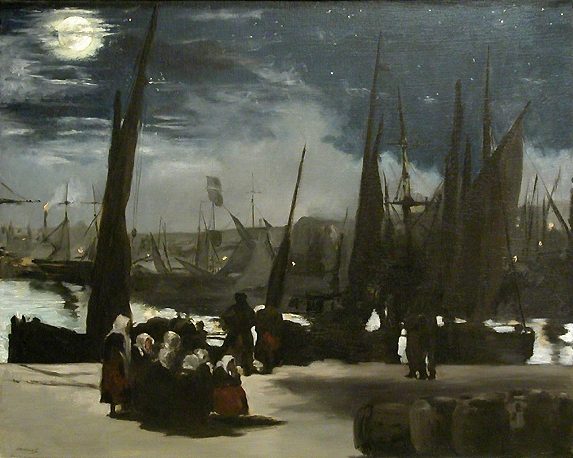
- Artist: Édouard Manet
- Year: 1868
- Medium: oil on canvas
- Dimensions: 82 cm × 101 cm (32 in × 40 in)
- Location: Musée d'Orsay, Paris

The Port of Boulogne by Moonlight or Moonlight over the Port of Boulogne (French - Le Clair de lune sur le port de Boulogne) is an 1868 work by Édouard Manet. The work is now in the Musée d'Orsay.

Historical and astronomical research has demonstrated that it was produced about midnight on the night of 3–4 August 1868 from a window of the Hôtel Folkestone on the quay at Boulogne-sur-Mer during one of the artist's regular summer stays in the town. It shows a fishing boat returning at night, watched by the fishermen's wives. Its shadows and light pay tribute to the work of Rembrandt.

== Presentation ==
Before the rise of the Côte d'Azur, the Parisian elite often spent their summers on the coast of the Channel. For example, Manet, who came from a wealthy family, stayed several times in Boulogne, where he painted many seascapes. In 1868 or 1869 the painter stayed at the Hôtel Folkestone, which overlooked the harbour. This is where Moonshine emerged over the port of Boulogne, which Manet later elaborated in his studio. Although the painting is often dated to 1869, 1868 is more likely, as the work was already on display at an exhibition in Brussels at the beginning of the summer of 1869.

The painting can be seen as a tribute to Dutch landscape painting and in particular to Aert van der Neer. Manet owned a work by this painter, who specialized in night scenes. However, Manet's casual painting style is far removed from Van der Neer's precise technique.

Moonshine over the port of Boulogne has a somewhat mysterious aura. The moonlight shines over a forest of masts and sails in the harbor. On the quay, a group of seven women in traditional costumes close together awaits the return of the fishing boats. Closer to the water's edge, a few men are still in the shade.

== See also ==
- List of paintings by Édouard Manet
- 1868 in art
