= Lola de Valence =

Painting by Édouard Manet

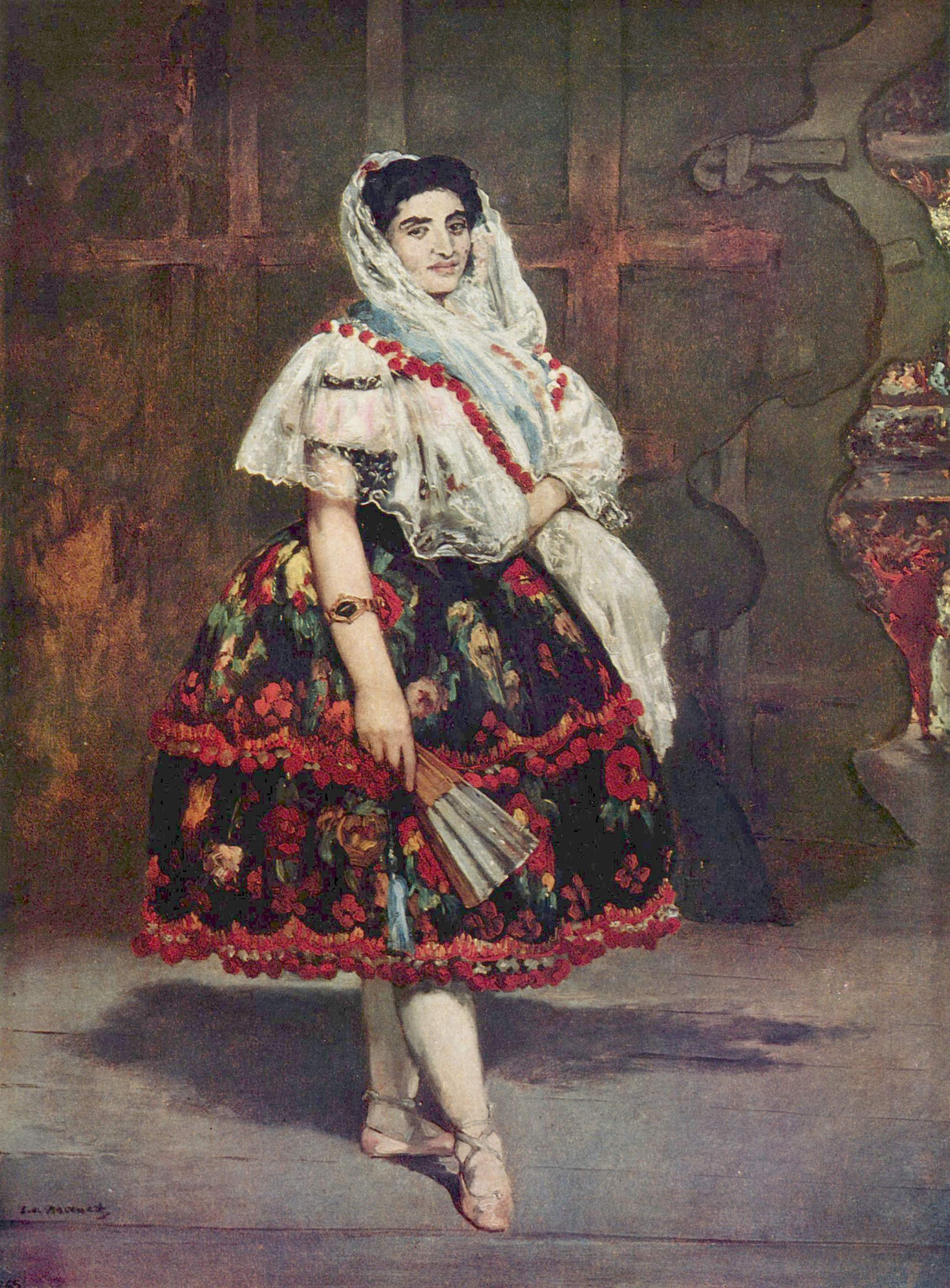
- Artist: Édouard Manet
- Year: 1862
- Type: Oil on canvas, portrait painting
- Dimensions: 123 cm × 92 cm (48 in × 36 in)
- Location: Musée d'Orsay, Paris

Lola de Valence is an 1862 portrait painting by the French artist Édouard Manet. It depicts the Spanish dancer Lola Melea. It was one of a series of Spanish-themed paintings he produced, although he emphasised the individual characters of his models. She was the lead dancer of Mariano Camprubí's Madrid troupe which performed at the Hippodrome in Paris from August to November 1862.

The painting was submitted to the Salon of 1863 but was rejected. It was exhibited instead at the Salon des Refusés hosted at the same time. It later also featured at the Exposition Universelle in 1889. It was acquired by the French state in 1911 and is now part of the collection of the Musée d'Orsay in Paris.

== See also ==
- List of paintings by Édouard Manet

== Bibliography ==
- Armstrong, Carol M. Manet Manette. Yale University Press, 2002.
- Tinterow, Gary & Lacambre, Geneviève. Manet/Velázquez: The French Taste for Spanish Painting. Metropolitan Museum of Art, 2003
