= Portrait of Monsieur Pertuiset the Lion-Hunter =

1881 painting by Édouard Manet

- Pertuiset, le chasseur de lions (French)
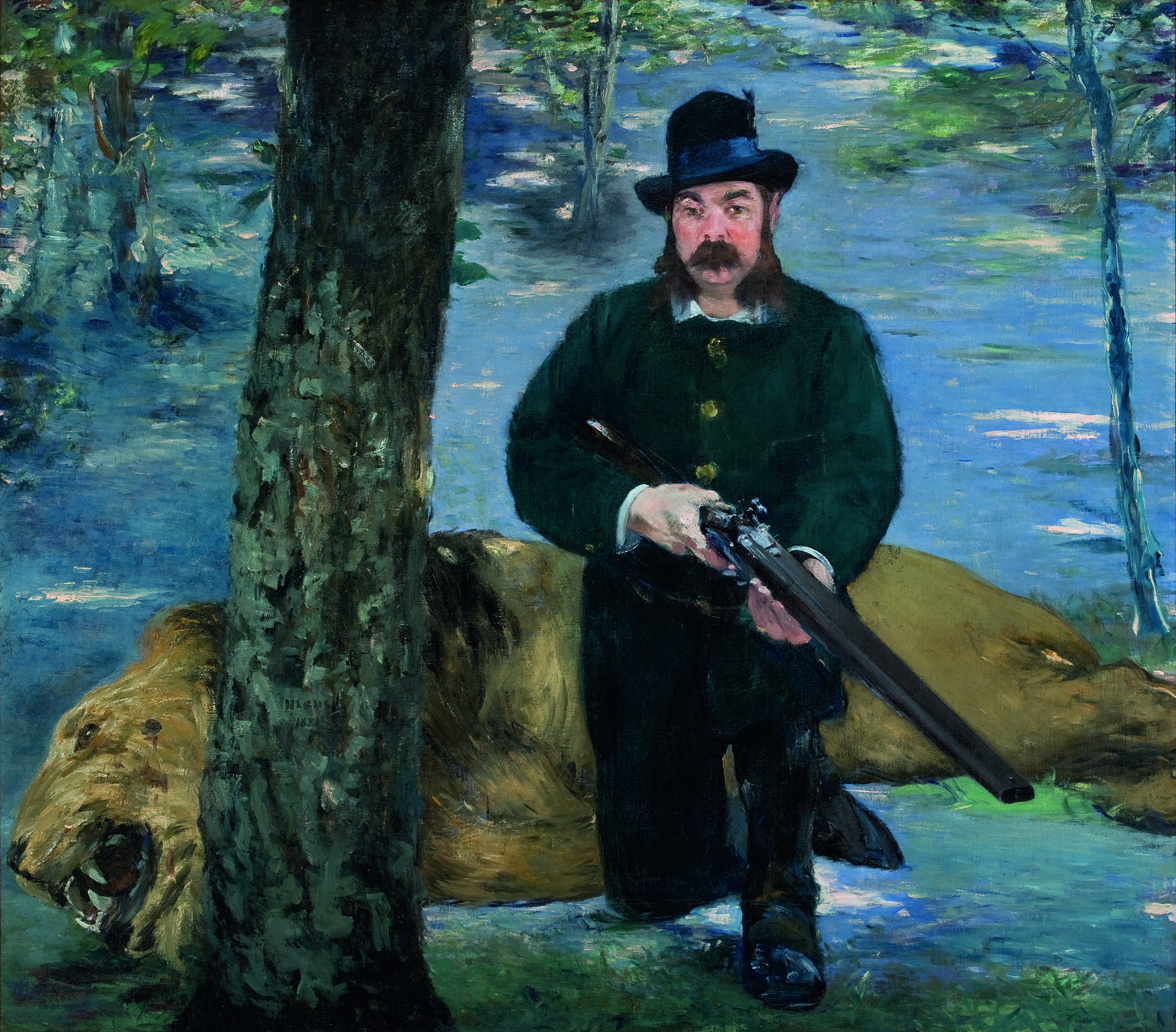
- Artist: Édouard Manet
- Year: 1881
- Medium: Oil on canvas
- Dimensions: 171.5 cm × 150.5 cm (67.5 in × 59.3 in)
- Location: São Paulo Art Museum; São Paulo

Portrait of Monsieur Pertuiset the Lion-Hunter is an 1881 oil-on-canvas portrait painting of the French explorer and adventurer Eugène Pertuiset (1833–1909) by Édouard Manet, now in the São Paulo Art Museum.

== Background ==
Eugène Pertuiset was a celebrated lion hunter who enjoyed considerable media attention and fame during the Second French Empire. In addition to being a big-game hunter, he was an engineer, collector of weapons and paintings, and was commissioned in 1873 by the Republic of Chile to lead an exploration of Tierra del Fuego. After crossing the Strait of Magellan, he made several expeditions into the interior, discovered coal deposits on Dawson Island and obtained a concession to establish a colony, which he intended to populate with settlers from France; however, the Chilean government withdrew from the project. Returning to Paris, he wrote colorful accounts of his adventures.

Pertuiset posed for Manet on the Boulevard de Clichy in 1880, with the monumental portrait completed in 1881. Manet had long been acquainted with Eugène Pertuiset, who had purchased several of his paintings, and had found Pertuiset's half-heroic, half-burlesque character to be amusing. For his part, Pertuiset was also an amateur artist, and in 1884 submitted his own version of the portrait, titled The Lion Hunt, which was exhibited at the new Société des Artistes Indépendants in 1884.

== Reception ==
The work places Pertuiset and a lion's body in a setting of trees with purple shadows, with the lion in the background, partially hidden by trees. Pertuiset, rather than striking a heroic pose as expected by his fans, is depicted on one knee, with a somewhat pensive expression. The setting is of course, imaginary, as Manet had never visited Africa or had witnessed a lion hunt, but the lion pelt may have been modeled after one Pertuiset acquired in a famed 1866 hunt. Manet exhibited Portrait of Monsieur Pertuiset the Lion-Hunter at the Paris Salon in 1881 where it received much condemnation from various critics who disliked its flat style, overuse of violet, and the originality of the pose. However, despite the negative reviews, the Salon awarded Manet a medal for the work, the first official recognition of his career.

== See also ==
- List of paintings by Édouard Manet
