= List of paintings by Édouard Manet =

This is a list of some of the more well-known paintings of French artist Édouard Manet (1832–1883).

== List ==
Image	Title	Date	Dimensions	Collection
	Christ the Gardener	1856–59	68 × 56.8 cm	Unidentified location
	The Absinthe Drinker	1859	180.5 × 105.6 cm	Ny Carlsberg Glyptotek
	Spanish Cavaliers	1859–60	45.5 × 26.5 cm	Museum of Fine Arts of Lyon
	Portrait of Monsieur and Madame Manet	1860	111.5 × 91 cm	Musée d'Orsay
	Portrait of Madame Brunet	1860 (ca)	132.4 × 100 cm	J. Paul Getty Museum
	The Spanish Singer	1860	147.3 × 114.3 cm	Metropolitan Museum of Art
	Boy Carrying a Sword	1861	131.1 × 93.4 cm	Metropolitan Museum of Art
	The Surprised Nymph	1860/61	146 × 114 cm	Museo Nacional de Bellas Artes Buenos Aires
	Street Singer	1862	174 × 118 cm	Museum of Fine Arts Boston
	Lola de Valence	1862	123 × 92 cm	Musée d'Orsay
	Music in the Tuileries Gardens	1862	76 × 118 cm	National Gallery London
	The Old Musician	1862	187.4 × 248.3 cm	National Gallery of Art Washington
	Oysters	1862	39.2 × 46.8 cm	National Gallery of Art Washington
	Portrait of Victorine Meurent	c. 1862	42.9 × 43.8 cm	Museum of Fine Arts Boston
	Mademoiselle Victorine Meurent in the Costume of an Espada	1862	165.1 × 127.6 cm	Metropolitan Museum of Art
	Little Lange	1862	117 × 71 cm	Staatliche Kunsthalle Karlsruhe
	Le déjeuner sur l'herbe	1863	89.5 x 116.5 cm	Courtauld Gallery
	Le déjeuner sur l'herbe	1863	208 × 264.5 cm	Musée d'Orsay
	La Négresse	1863	61 × 50 cm	Pinacoteca Giovanni e Marella Agnelli
	Olympia	1863	130.5 × 190 cm	Musée d'Orsay
	Young Man Dressed as a Majo	1863	188 × 125 cm	Metropolitan Museum of Art
	The Dead Toreador	probably 1864	75.9 × 155.3 cm	National Gallery of Art Washington
	La Corrida	1864/65	48 × 108 cm	Frick Collection
	The Dead Christ with Angels	1864	179 × 150 cm	Metropolitan Museum of Art
	The Kearsarge at Boulogne	1864	81.6 × 100 cm	Metropolitan Museum of Art
	The Battle of the U.S.S. "Kearsarge" and the C.S.S. "Alabama"	1864	134 × 127 cm	Philadelphia Museum of Art
	The Races at Longchamp	1865?	43.9 × 84.5 cm	Art Institute of Chicago
	Jesus Insulted by the Soldiers	1865	190.8 × 148.3 cm	Art Institute of Chicago
	Bullfight	1865/66	90 × 110 cm	Musée d'Orsay
	Bullfight – Death of the Bull	1865/66	48 × 60.4 cm	Art Institute of Chicago
	The Matador Saluting	1866/67	171.1 × 113 cm	Metropolitan Museum of Art
	The Fifer	1866	161 × 97 cm	Musée d'Orsay
	A Young Lady in 1866	1866	185.1 × 128.6 cm	Metropolitan Museum of Art
	The Execution of Emperor Maximilian	1868	252 × 305 cm	Kunsthalle Mannheim
	Portrait of Emile Zola	1868	146 × 114 cm	Musée d'Orsay
	Boy Blowing Bubbles	1867	100.5 × 81.4 cm	Calouste Gulbenkian Museum
	Madame Manet at the Piano	1867-68	38 × 45.5 cm	Musée d'Orsay
	The Balcony	1869	170 × 124 cm	Musée d'Orsay
	Luncheon in the Studio (Le déjeuner dans l'atelier)	1868	118 × 154 cm	Neue Pinakothek
	The Reading	1868-69	74 × 61 cm	Musée d'Orsay
	Clair de lune sur le port de Boulogne	1869	82 × 101 cm	Musée d'Orsay
	The Folkestone Boat, Boulogne	1869	60 × 73 cm	Philadelphia Museum of Art
	The Brioche	1870	65 × 81 cm	Metropolitan Museum of Art
	Repose (Berthe Morisot)	1869/70	150.2 × 114 cm	Rhode Island School of Design Museum
	The Funeral	1867-70	72.7 × 90.5 cm	Metropolitan Museum of Art
	Effect of Snow on Petit-Montrouge	1870	59.7 × 49.7 cm	National Museum Cardiff
	Berthe Morisot With a Bouquet of Violets	1872	55 × 38 cm	Musée d'Orsay
	Tarring a Boat	1873	59 × 60 cm	Barnes Foundation
	The Railway	1872/73	93.3 × 111.5 cm	National Gallery of Art Washington
	The Croquet Game	1873	72 × 106 cm	Städel Museum
	Masked Ball at the Opera House	1873	59 × 72.5 cm	National Gallery of Art Washington
	Argenteuil	1874	149 × 115 cm	Musée des Beaux-Arts Tournai
	Banks of the Seine at Argenteuil	1874	62.3 × 103 cm	Courtauld Gallery
	Monet Painting on His Studio Boat	1874	50 × 64 cm	Neue Pinakothek
	Boating	1874	97.1 × 130.2 cm	Metropolitan Museum of Art
	Berthe Morisot with a Fan	1874	61 × 50.5 cm	Palais des Beaux-Arts de Lille
	The grand canal of Venice (Blue Venice)	1875	54 × 65 cm	Shelburne Museum
	Laundry (Le Linge)	1875	145 × 115 cm	Barnes Foundation
	Portrait of Stéphane Mallarmé	1876	27 × 36 cm	Musée d'Orsay
	Le Suicidé	1877 - 1881	38 × 46 cm	Foundation E. G. Bührle
	Nana	1877	154 × 115 cm	Kunsthalle Hamburg
	The Rue Mosnier with Flags	1878	65.5 × 81 cm	J. Paul Getty Museum
	Plum Brandy	1878	73.6 × 50.2 cm	National Gallery of Art Washington
	Blonde Woman with Bare Breasts	1878	62.5 × 52 cm	Musée d'Orsay
	Chez Tortoni	1880	26 × 34 cm	Stolen, location unknown
	Georges Clemenceau	1879-80	115.9 x 88.2 cm	Kimbell Art Museum
	Georges Clemenceau	1879-80	94 x 73.8 cm	Musée d'Orsay
	In the Conservatory	1879	115 × 150 cm	Alte Nationalgalerie
	Madame Manet in the Conservatory	1879	81.5 × 100 cm	National Gallery Oslo
	Chez le père Lathuille	1879	93 × 112 cm	Musée des Beaux-Arts Tournai
	Le Promeneur	1879		Deji Art Museum
	Portrait of Marguerite Gauthier-Lathuille	1879	81 × 50 cm	Museum of Fine Arts of Lyon
	The Café-Concert	1879	47.3 × 39.1 cm	Walters Art Museum
	Corner of a Café-Concert	1879	97.1 × 77.5 cm	National Gallery London
	The Waitress	1879	75.5 × 65 cm	Musée d'Orsay
	Self-Portrait with Palette	1879	83 × 67 cm	Private collection
	Émilie Ambre as Carmen	1880	92.4 x 73.5 cm	Philadelphia Museum of Art
	A Bundle of Asparagus	1880	46 x 55 cm	Wallraf–Richartz Museum
	A Sprig of Asparagus	1880	160 x 210 cm	Musée d'Orsay
	Escape of Rochefort	1881	143 × 114 cm	Kunsthaus Zurich
	L'Automne (Méry Laurent)	1881	73 × 51 cm	Musée des Beaux-Arts de Nancy
	Le Printemps (Spring)	1881	73 × 51 cm	J. Paul Getty Museum
	Portrait of Monsieur Pertuiset the Lion-Hunter	1881	150 × 170 cm	Museu de Arte de São Paulo
	Dead Eagle Owl	1881	97 x 64 cm	Foundation E. G. Bührle
	A Bar at the Folies-Bergère	1881 – 1882	96 × 130 cm	Courtauld Gallery
	The House at Rueil	1882	71.5 × 92.3 cm	Alte Nationalgalerie
	The House at Rueil	1882	92.8 × 73.5 cm	National Gallery of Victoria
	Flowers in a Crystal Vase	1882	32 × 24 cm	Musée d'Orsay
	White Lilacs in a Glass Vase	1882	54 × 42 cm	Alte Nationalgalerie
	Summer or The Amazon or Horsewoman, Fullface	c. 1882	73 × 52 cm	Thyssen-Bornemisza Museum; Courtesan / model Cora Pearl known as the Amazon
	At the Café or Au Café	1879		Collection Oskar Reinhart 'Am Römerholz' Winterthur
