= The Brioche =

1870 painting by Édouard Manet

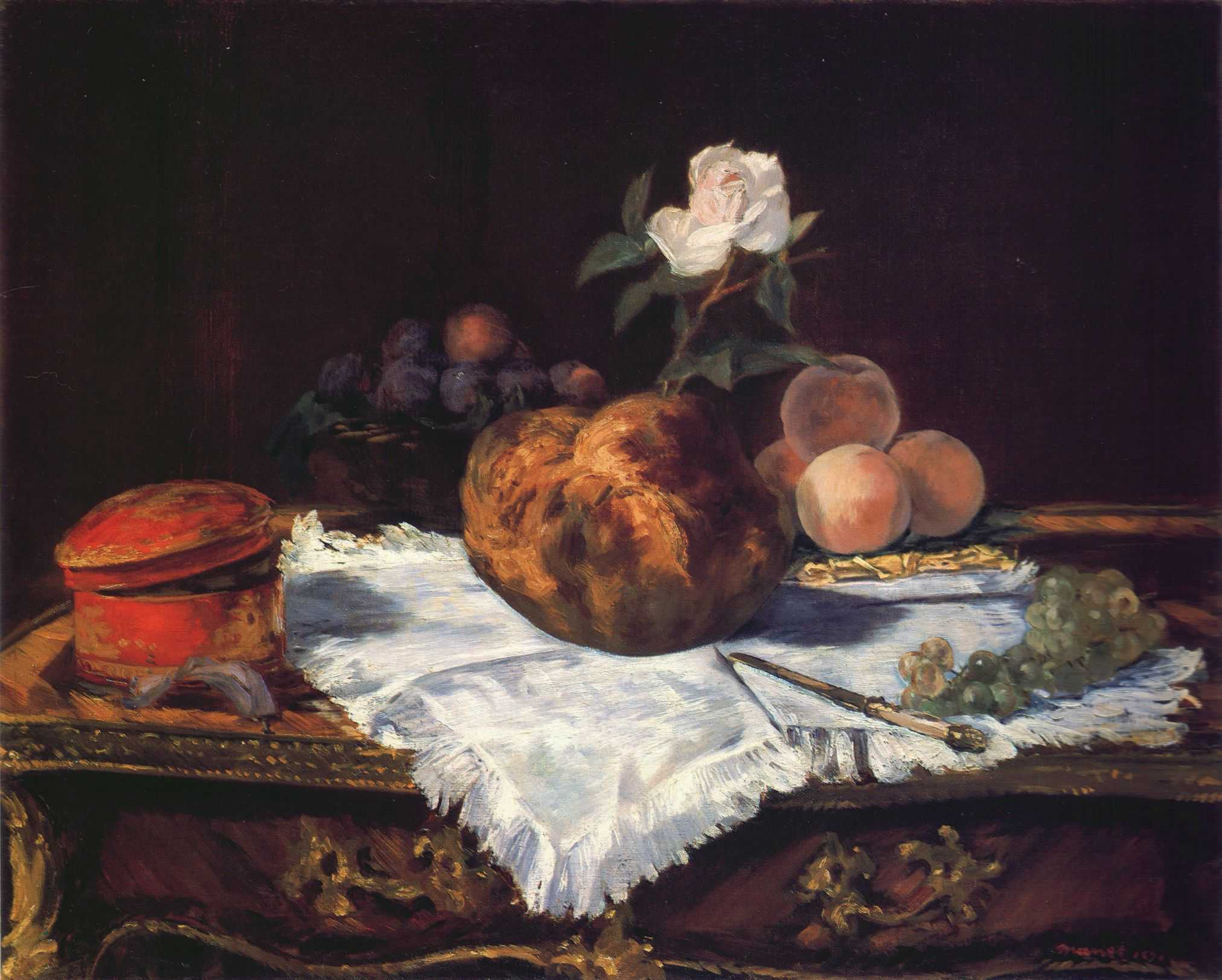
- Artist: Édouard Manet
- Year: 1870
- Medium: Oil on canvas
- Dimensions: 65.1 cm × 81 cm (25.6 in × 32 in)
- Location: Metropolitan Museum of Art; New York
- Accession: 1991.287

The Brioche is a painting completed in 1870 by the French artist Édouard Manet. Done in oil on canvas, the work depicts a brioche loaf resting on a table. It is in the collection of the Metropolitan Museum of Art.

Manet was inspired to paint it after a painting of a brioche by 18th-century artist Jean Siméon Chardin was donated to the Louvre in Paris. In Manet's work the brioche is accompanied by peaches and plums. It is singular among Manet's still lifes for its formality, and mark the last time he would paint such an elaborate tabletop composition.

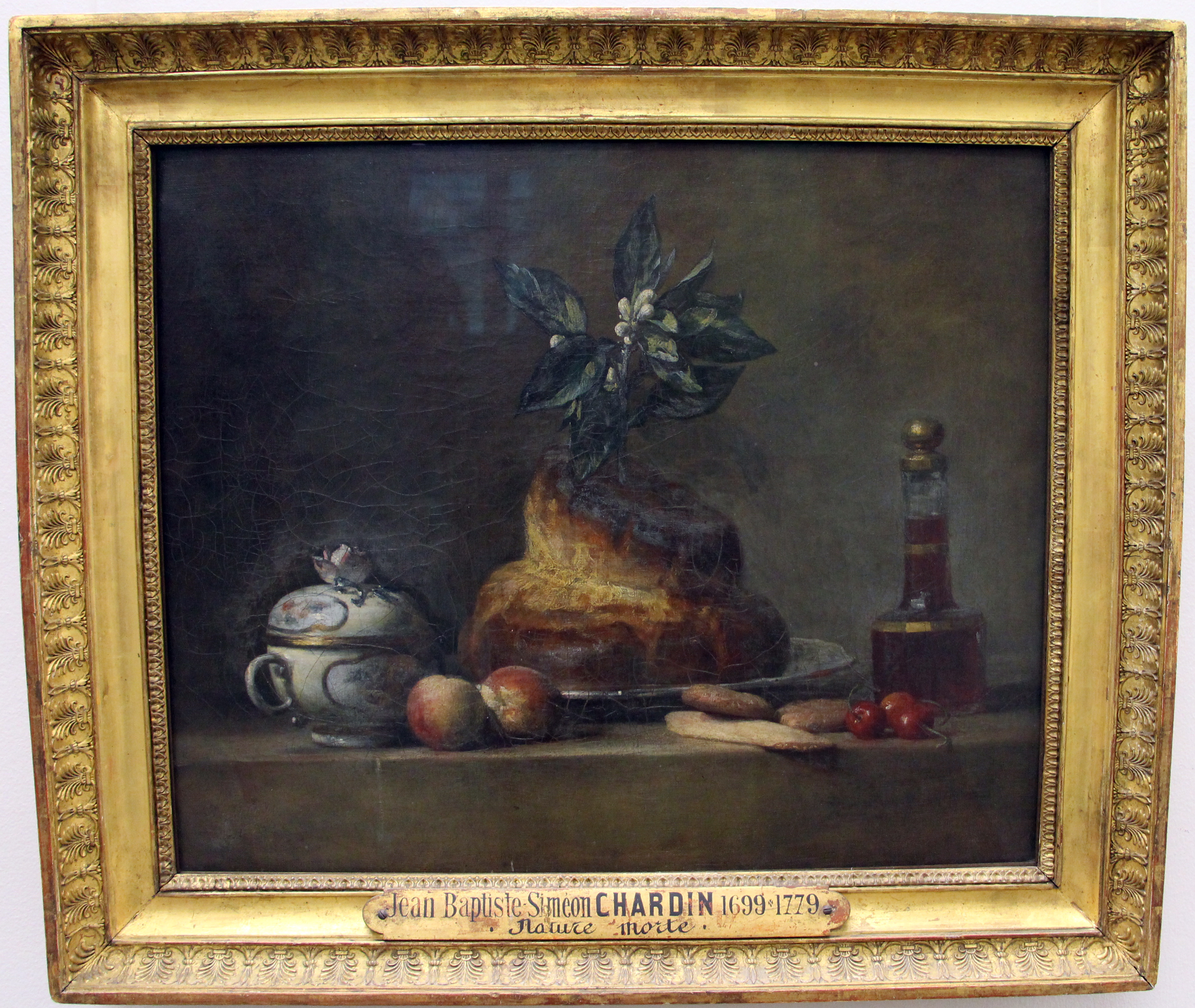
La Brioche by Chardin, 1763, Louvre

== See also ==
- List of paintings by Édouard Manet
- 1870 in art
