= Spanish Cavaliers =

Painting by Édouard Manet

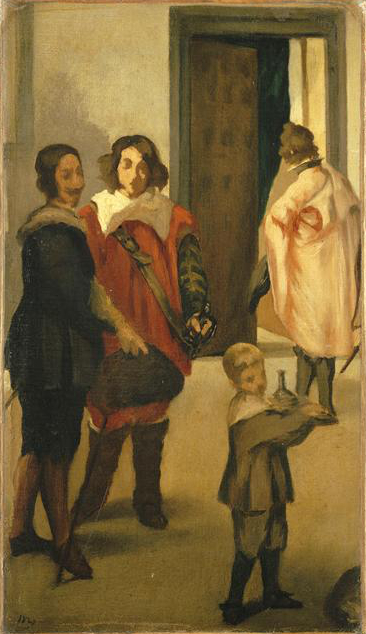
Spanish Cavaliers (1859) by Édouard Manet

Spanish Cavaliers (Cavaliers espagnols) is an 1859 oil-on-canvas painting by Édouard Manet, now in the Musée des beaux-arts de Lyon.

As in his Scene in a Spanish Studio, the work reuses elements from Manet's copy of a painting attributed at that time to Diego Velázquez, Little Cavaliers. The open door is taken from Velázquez's Las Meninas. The child in the right foreground is the 7- or 8-year old Léon Koëlla-Leenhoff, who also appeared in Manet's similarly Spanish-influenced Boy Carrying a Sword.

Spanish Cavaliers was first exhibited as work 6 in the autumn Salon of 1905. Manet's family sold the work directly to the art collector Cheramy. It was later bought by Raymond Tripier, a Lyon doctor who left it to its present owner in 1917. The Wildenstein catalogues also mention the art dealer Paul Guillaume as one of the work's other owners, though this is unlikely since Guillaume was born in 1891. It toured to the musée Cantini in Marseille in 1961 as work 27.

== See also ==
- List of paintings by Édouard Manet
- 1859 in art

== Bibliography ==
- Cachin, Françoise; Moffett, Charles S.; Wilson-Bareau, Juliet (1983). Manet, 1832-1883 : Galeries nationales du Grand Palais, Paris, 22 avril-1er août 1983, Metropolitan Museum of Art, New York, 10 septembre-27 novembre 1983 (in French). [Paris]: Ministère de la Culture. ISBN 2-7118-0230-2. OCLC 9663346.
- Monneret, Sophie (1987). L'impressionnisme et son époque : dictionnaire international (in French). Vol. 2 part 1. Paris: R Laffont. ISBN 2-221-05222-6. OCLC 33526541.
- Proust, Antonin (1897). "Édouard Manet : souvenirs". La Revue blanche, 1891-1903. Paris.
