= Tarring a Boat =

1873 painting by Édouard Manet

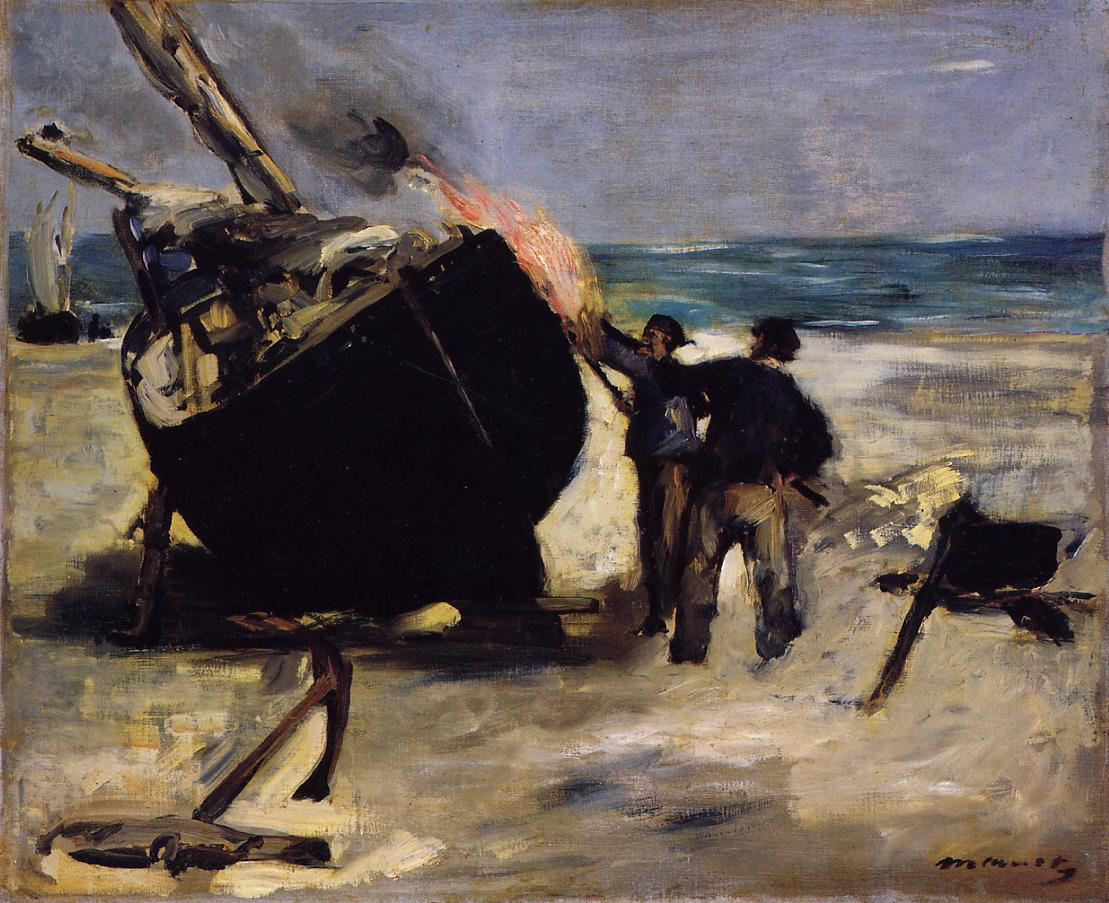
Tarring a Boat (1873) by Édouard Manet

Tarring a Boat (French - Le Bateau goudronné) is an 1873 oil-on-canvas painting by Édouard Manet, painted at Berck beach during one of his regular summer stays in Boulogne-sur-Mer. It shows the hull of a fishing boat being tarred. In it he used a darker palette than usual, typical of his work of that period. It is now in the Barnes Foundation in Philadelphia.

== See also ==
- List of paintings by Édouard Manet
- 1873 in art
