= Repose (painting) =

c. 1871 painting by Édouard Manet

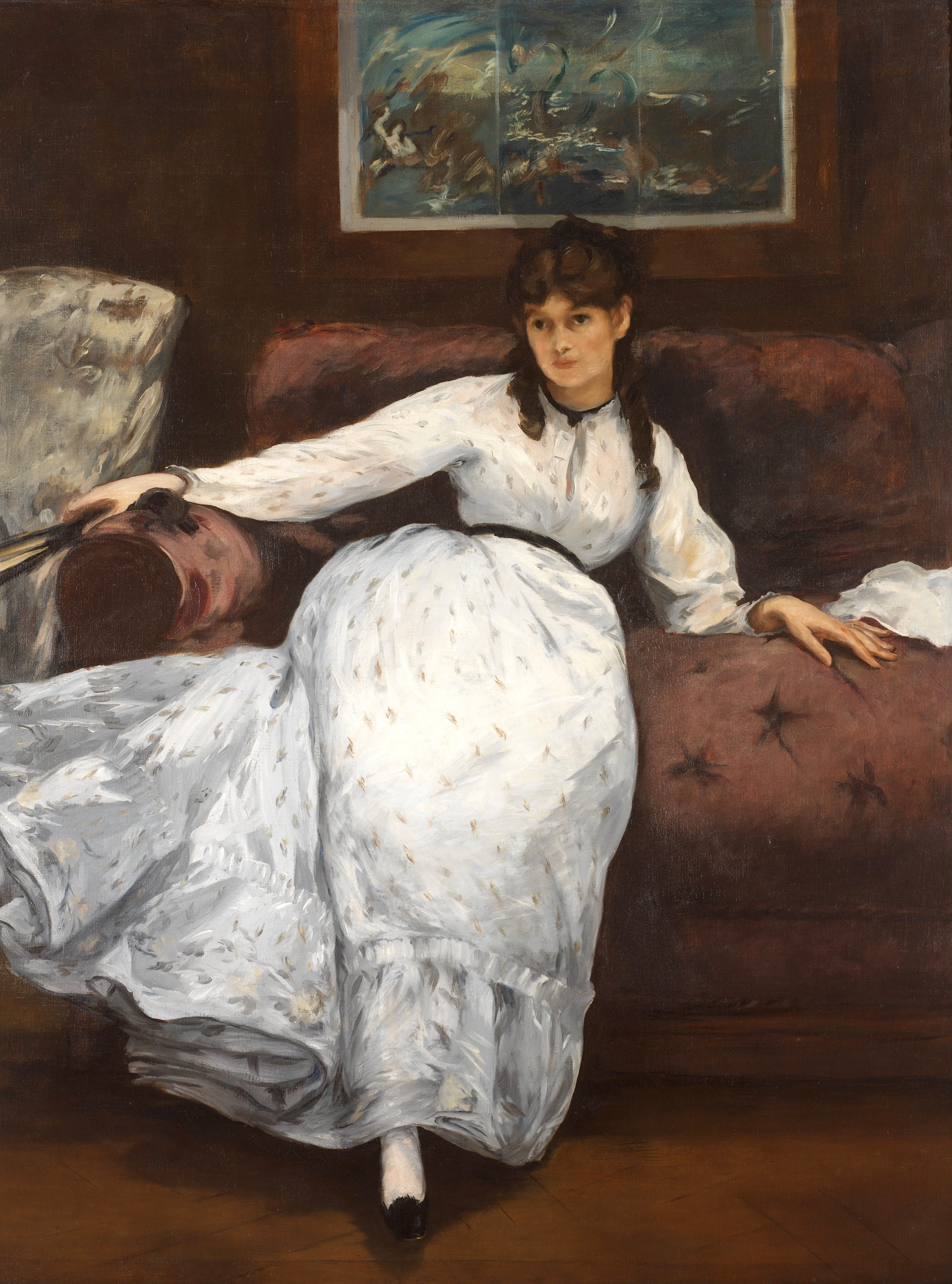
- Artist: Édouard Manet
- Year: c. 1871
- Type: Oil paint on canvas
- Dimensions: 150.2 by 114 centimetres (59.1 in × 44.9 in)
- Location: Rhode Island School of Design Museum; Providence, Rhode Island

Repose (French: Le Repos, 'Rest') is an oil on canvas painting by French painter Édouard Manet, from c. 1871. It is held in the Rhode Island School of Design Museum, in Providence.

The painting is a portrait of the artist Berthe Morisot, a regular model, and renowned impressionist artist herself, who married Manet's brother, Eugène in 1874. She is wearing a white dress as she sits with a fan in her right hand on a red sofa, beneath a then-fashionable Japanese print (in this case The Dragon King Pursuing the Ama with the Sacred Jewel by Utagawa Kuniyoshi). Her gaze seems meditative and absent. There is a striking contrast between the light tone of her dress and the dark tones of the furniture and the serenity of the subject with the violent activity on the print that is exhibited above her head.

Manet himself described the work as a study in physical and psychological repose — “not at all in the character of a portrait.”

== See also ==
- List of paintings by Édouard Manet
