= Departure of the Folkestone Steamer =

Painting by Édouard Manet

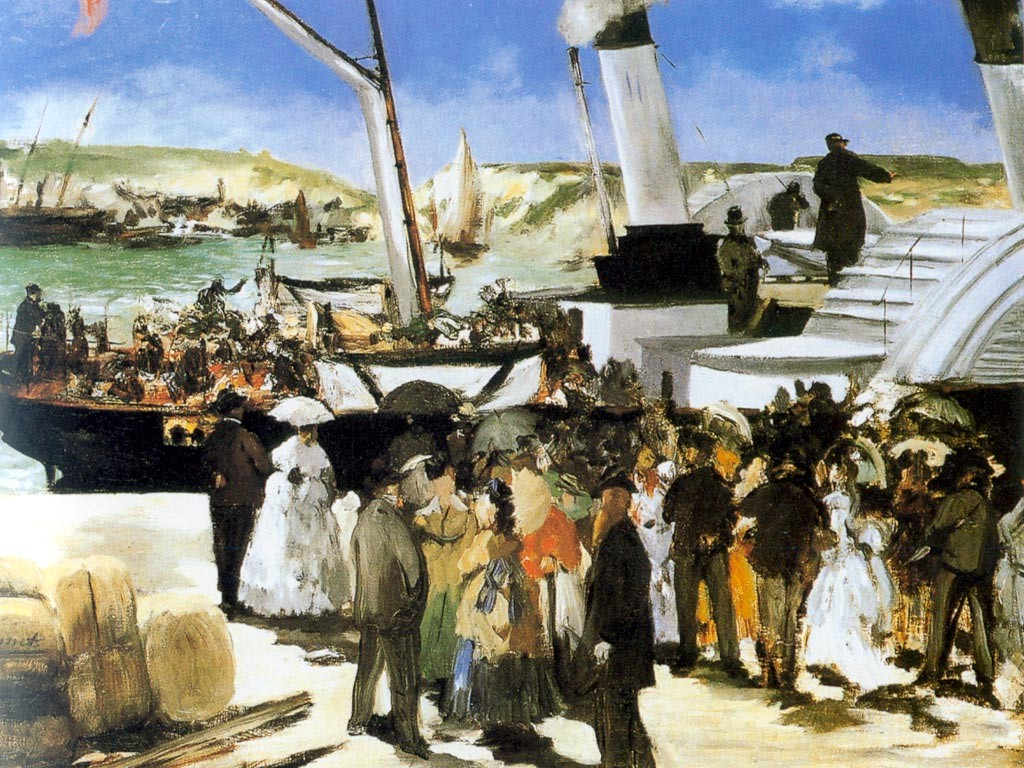
- Artist: Édouard Manet
- Year: 1869
- Medium: oil on canvas
- Dimensions: 60 cm × 73 cm (24 in × 29 in)
- Location: Philadelphia Museum of Art; Philadelphia

Departure of the Folkestone Steamer or The Folkestone Boat, Boulogne (French - Le Départ du vapeur de Folkestone) is an 1869 oil-on-canvas painting by Édouard Manet, produced during one of his regular summer stays at Boulogne-sur-Mer. It shows a dawn scene with the steamship which regularly sailed between Boulogne and Folkestone – Manet and his family had embarked on it the previous year en route to London and the woman in white on the far left of the work is Suzanne Manet, accompanied by their son Léon. It is now in the Philadelphia Museum of Art.

The canvas is one of the most notable examples of how Manet knew how to play with light and color to give his works an atmosphere of joy and lightheartedness.

== See also ==
- List of paintings by Édouard Manet
