= Portrait of Madame Brunet =

Painting by Édouard Manet

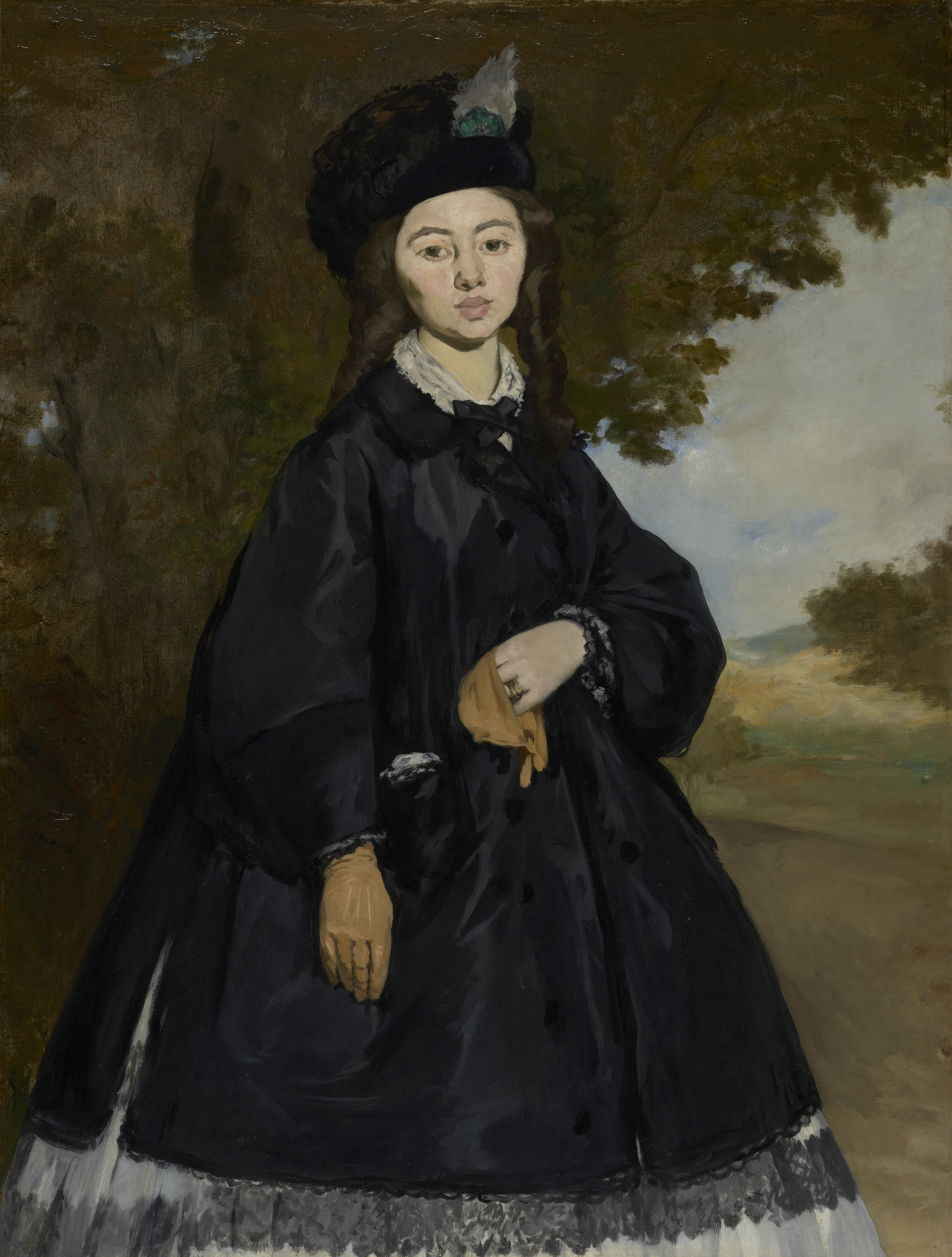
- Artist: Édouard Manet
- Year: 1861–1863
- Medium: Oil on canvas
- Dimensions: 132.4 cm × 100 cm (52.1 in × 39 in)
- Location: J. Paul Getty Museum; Los Angeles

Portrait of Madame Brunet is an oil painting on canvas by Édouard Manet, begun in 1861 and completed in 1863. Its subject is Caroline de Pène, the wife of the sculptor Eugène Cyrille Brunet. According to Duret she was not beautiful and – although Manet flattered her – she burst into tears when she first saw the painting. It originally depicted the sitter full-length, but by 1867 Manet had cut away the bottom section.

The tonality of the painting, with its emphasis on black, shows the influence of Spanish art, and Diego Velázquez in particular. Velázquez's Philip IV as a Hunter has been suggested as a likely inspiration for the landscape background.

The painting was acquired from the private Payne-Whitney collection in New York (largely built up by Gertrude Vanderbilt Whitney) by the J. Paul Getty Museum, in Los Angeles, in 2011.

== Title ==
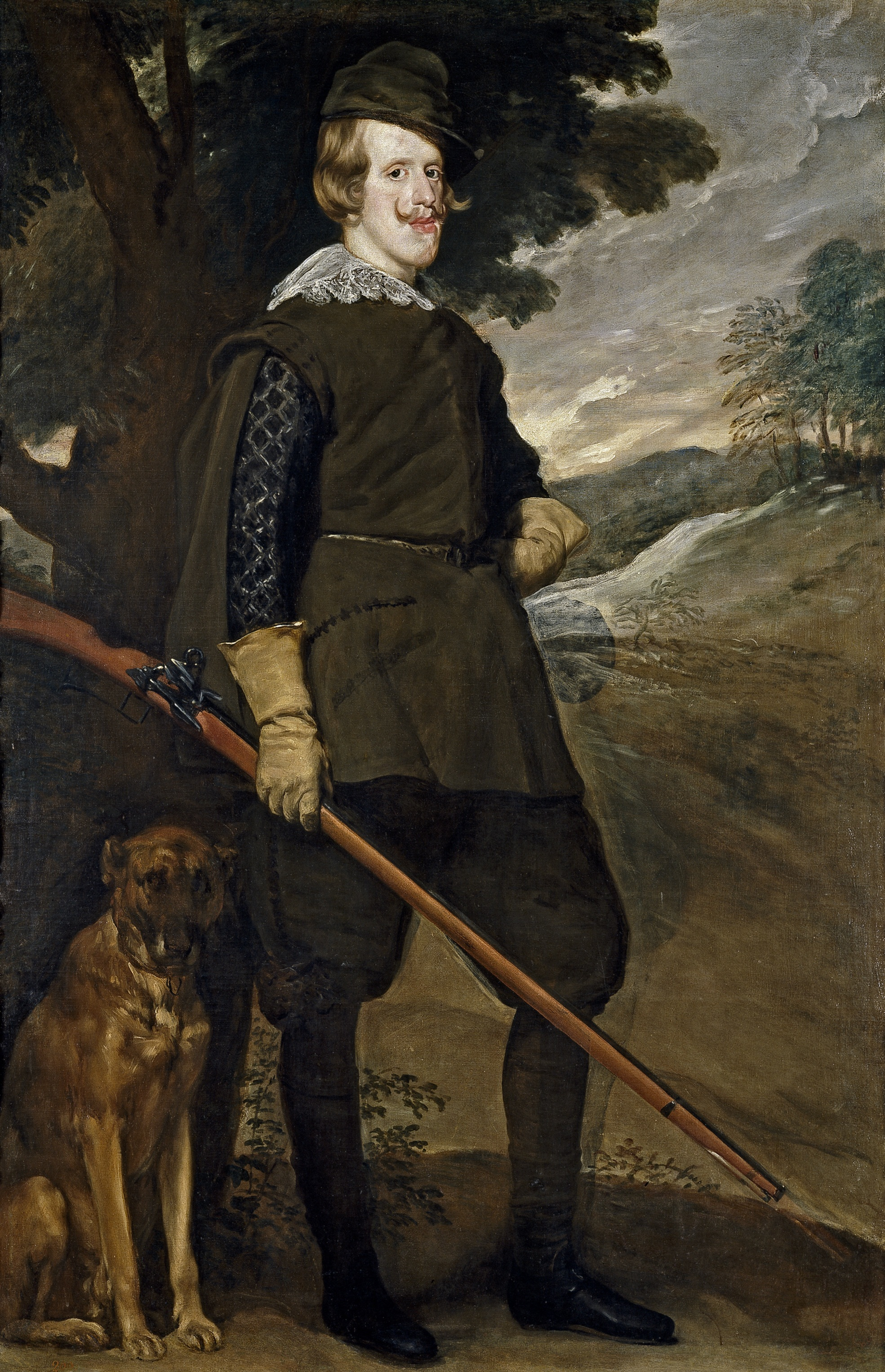
Velázquez, Philip IV as a Hunter, c. 1632–1634, Museo del Prado

When first exhibiting the work in 1867, Manet entitled it Portrait of Madame B.. At that exhibition Moreau-Nélaton referred to it as La Parisienne de 1862 (The Parisian Woman of 1862). Tabarant stated its subject to be Madame Brunet, née Penne, and called the painting La Femme au gant (Woman with a Glove). In 1902, Théodore Duret retitled the work Jeune dame en 1860 (Young Woman in 1860).

The work was mocked by the popular press and refused by its subject, remaining in Manet's studio for a long time. It appears in the inventory of his works as number 14 with the title Woman with a Glove, Fashion of 1850, being retitled Young Woman of 1860 at the 1884 sale of his works. Just after the sale, Durand-Ruel sold it to Jacques-Émile Blanche, who sold on the painting around 1930 to the galerie Knoedler in Paris. It was then acquired by Mrs Charles S. Payson née Joan Witney.

== See also ==
- List of paintings by Édouard Manet
- 1860 in art

== Bibliography ==
- Timothy James Clark, The Painting of Modern Life: Paris in the Art of Manet and His Followers, Princeton, Princeton University Press, 1999, 376 p. (ISBN 978-0691009032)
- (in French) Françoise Cachin, Charles S. Moffett et Juliet Wilson-Bareau, Manet 1832–1883, Paris, Réunion des musées nationaux, 1983, 544 p. (ISBN 2-7118-0230-2)
- (in French) Adolphe Tabarant, Manet et ses œuvres, Paris, Gallimard, 1947, 600 p.
- (in French) Adolphe Tabarant, Les Manet de la collection Havemeyer : La Renaissance de l'art français, Paris, 1930, XIII éd.
- (in French) Étienne Moreau-Nélaton, Manet raconté par lui-même, vol. 2, t. I, Paris, Henri Laurens, 1926
- (in French) Étienne Moreau-Nélaton, Manet raconté par lui-même, vol. 2, t. I, Paris, Henri Laurens, 1926
- (in French) Henri Loyrette and Gary Tinterow, Impressionnisme : Les origines, 1859–1869, 476 p. (ISBN 978-2711828203)
- (in French) Collectif RMN, Manet inventeur du moderne, Paris, 2011, 297 p. (ISBN 978-2-07-013323-9)
