= Christ the Gardener =

Painting by Édouard Manet

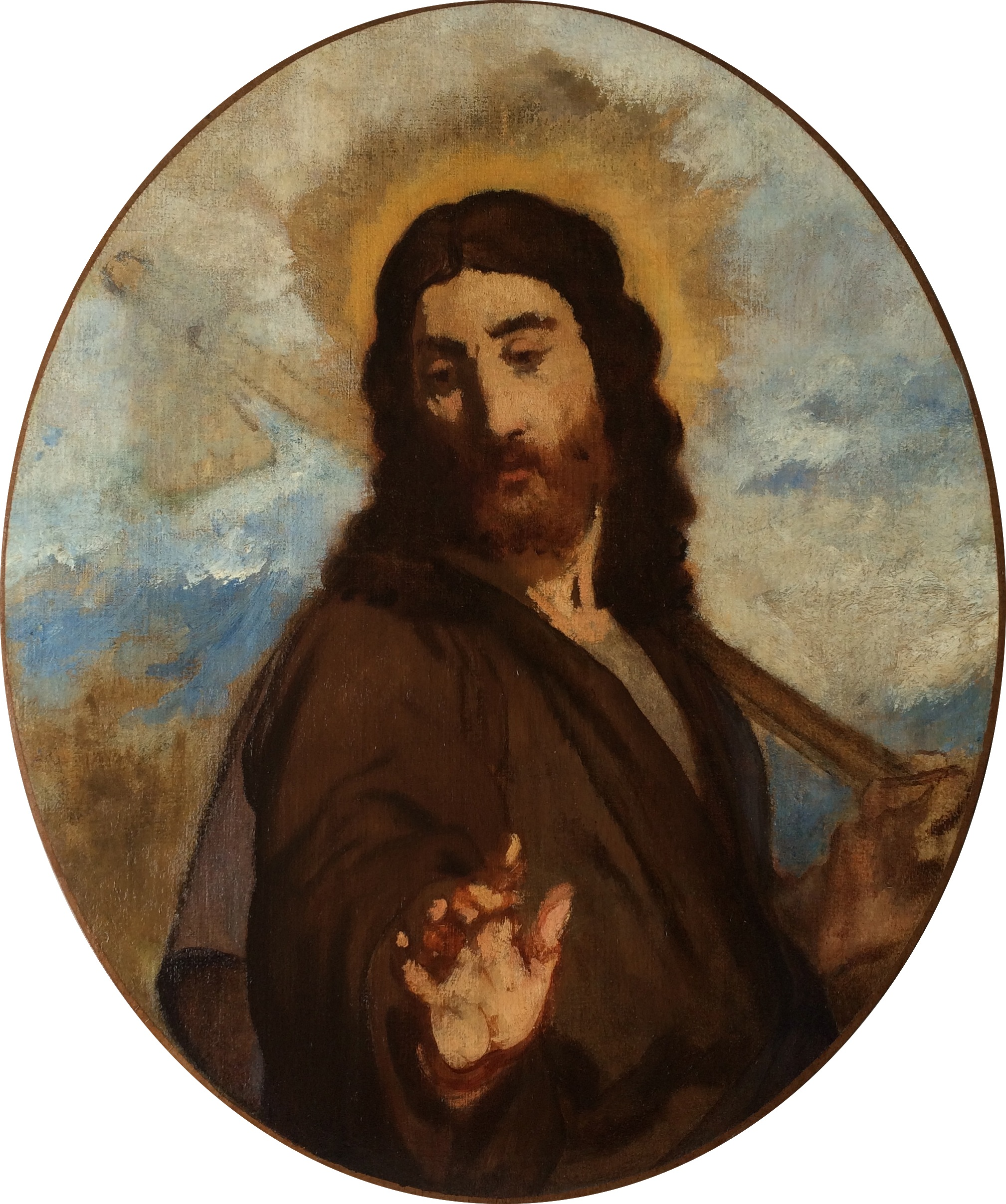
- Artist: Édouard Manet
- Completion date: 1859
- Medium: Oil on canvas painting
- Subject: Jesus
- Dimensions: 68 cm × 56.8 cm (27 in × 22.4 in)
- Location: private collection

Christ the Gardener is an oil on canvas painting by Édouard Manet, executed from 1856 to 1859, one of his few religious works. It shows the risen Christ in the Noli me tangere episode, although unusually Mary Magdalene is not shown. It is now in a private collection.

== See also ==
- List of paintings by Édouard Manet
- 1859 in art
