= Portrait of Monsieur and Madame Manet =

Painting by Édouard Manet

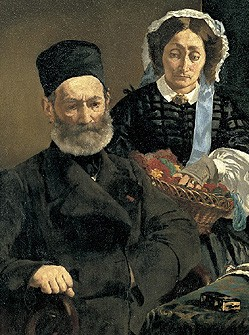
- Artist: Édouard Manet
- Year: 1860
- Medium: oil on canvas
- Dimensions: 111.5 cm × 93 cm (43.9 in × 37 in)
- Location: Musée d'Orsay; Paris

Portrait of Monsieur and Madame Manet is an 1860 portrait by Édouard Manet of his parents, Auguste Manet (1797–1862) and Eugénie Désirée Fournier (1811–1895). It was first exhibited at the 1861 Paris Salon alongside The Spanish Singer. It was initially owned by the painter's brother Eugène Manet before passing to Ernest Rouart's wife Julie Manet. In 1977, ten years after Julie's death, the Rouart-Manet family donated it to the French state, which moved it from the galerie du Jeu de Paume to the Musée d'Orsay, in Paris, in 1985, where it still hangs.

== See also ==
- List of paintings by Édouard Manet
- 1860 in art
