= Oysters (painting) =

Painting by Édouard Manet

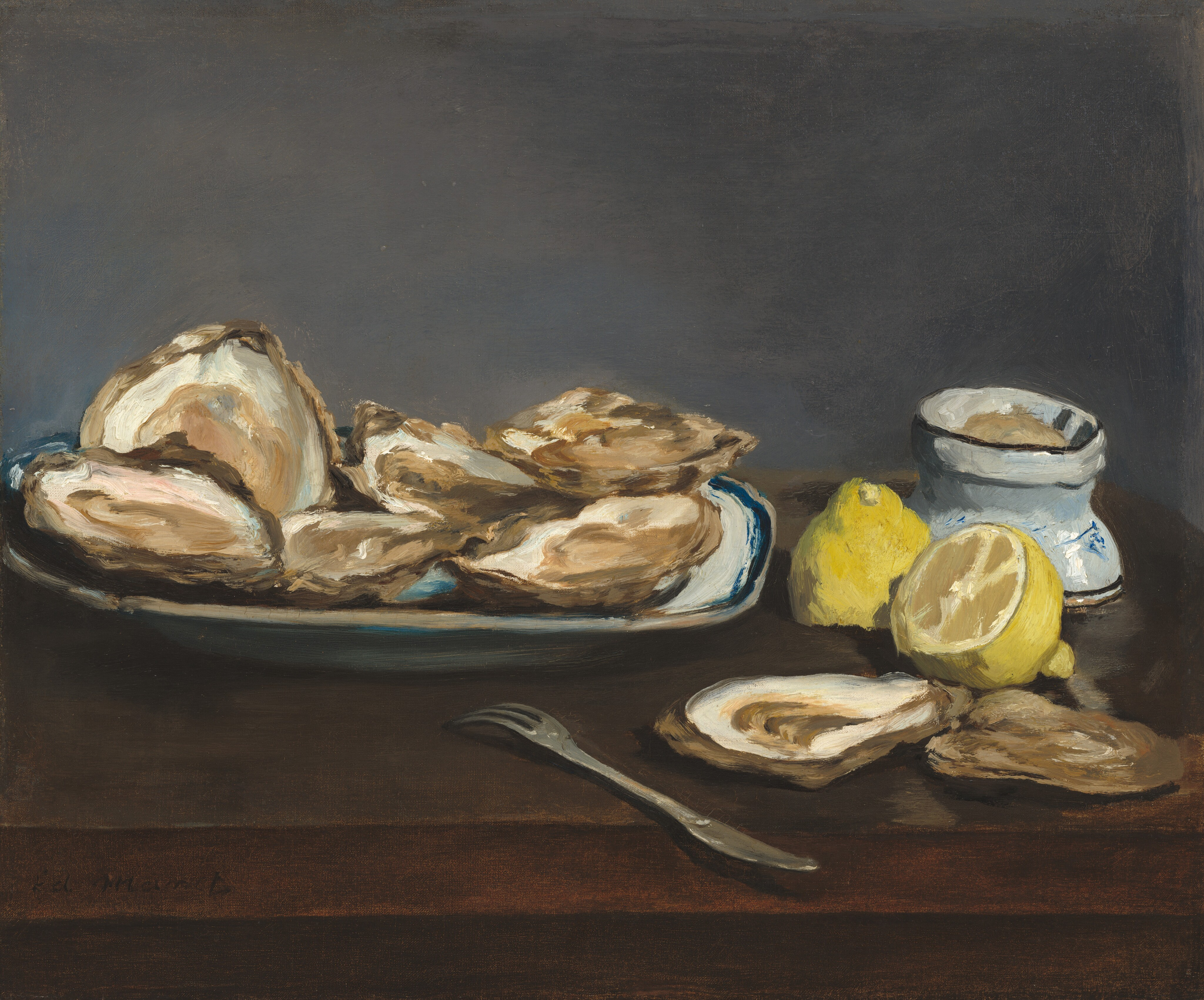
- Artist: Édouard Manet
- Year: 1862
- Type: Oil on canvas, still life
- Dimensions: 39.2 cm × 46.8 cm (15.4 in × 18.4 in)
- Location: National Gallery of Art, Washington D.C.

Oysters is an 1862 oil painting by the French artist Édouard Manet. A still life it depicts a platter of six opened oysters along with a sliced lemon and a jug with butter. It was Manet's first still life.

The painting is now part of the collection of the National Gallery of Art in Washington D.C., having been acquired in 1962.

== See also ==
- List of paintings by Édouard Manet

== Bibliography ==
- Anderson, Maxwell Lincoln. American Visionaries: Selections from the Whitney Museum of American Art, 2001.
- Armstrong, Carol M. Manet Manette. Yale University Press, 2002.
- Marrinan, Michael. Gustave Caillebotte: Painting the Paris of Naturalism, 1872-1887 . Getty Research Institute, 2016.
