= Madame Manet in the Conservatory =

Painting by Édouard Manet

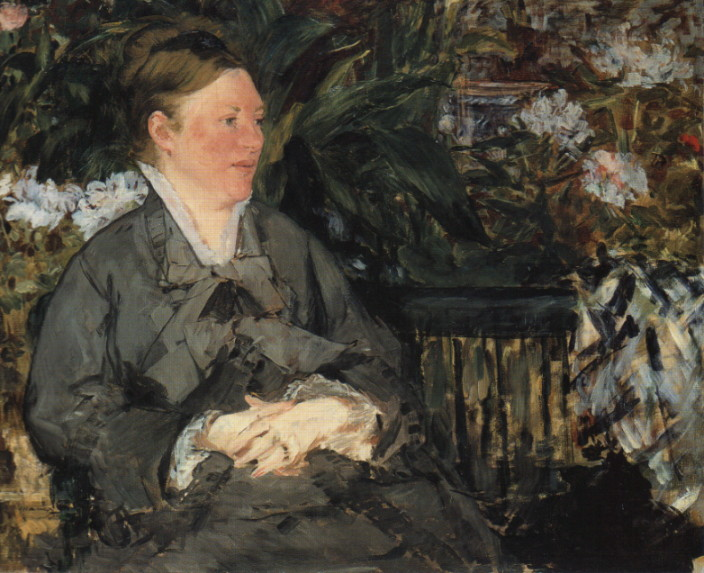
- Artist: Édouard Manet
- Year: 1879
- Medium: oil on canvas
- Dimensions: 81 cm × 100 cm (32 in × 39 in)
- Location: National Gallery of Norway, Oslo

Madame Manet in the Conservatory is an 1879 oil on canvas painting by Édouard Manet of his wife Suzanne. It is held in the National Gallery, in Oslo.

It shows its subject in a conservatory, where she often came to help Manet out with sittings for his In the Conservatory. She reluctantly parted from the work in August 1895 due to a pressing need for money. It was bought from her for 6000 francs by Maurice Joyant, art collector and childhood friend of Toulouse-Lautrec. In July 1911, Joyant sold it is to Georges Bernheim. The Friends of the National Gallery of Norway acquired it in 1918.

It is believed that before selling the original portrait in 1895, Suzanne commissioned her nephew, Edouard Vibert, to create a copy of Madame Manet in the Conservatory. It is unknown precisely when this copy was made, however it remained in Suzanne's possession until her death in 1906. It later circulated in Germany for a long period as an original Manet work before ultimately being designated as a copy.

== See also ==
- List of paintings by Édouard Manet

== Bibliography ==
- Timothy James Clark, The Painting of Modern Life: Paris in the Art of Manet and His Followers, Princeton, Princeton University Press, 1999, 376 p. (ISBN 978-0691009032).
- Cachin, Françoise; Moffett, Charles S.; Bareau, Juliet Wilson (1983). Manet, 1832-1883 : Galeries nationales du Grand Palais, Paris, 22 avril-1er août 1983, Metropolitan Museum of Art, New York, 10 septembre-27 novembre 1983 (in French). [Paris]: Ministère de la Culture. ISBN 2-7118-0230-2. OCLC 9663346.
- Tabarant, A. (1947). Manet et ses oeuvres (in French). [Paris]: Gallimard. OCLC 608628437.
- (in French) Adolphe Tabarant, Les Manet de la collection Havemeyer : La Renaissance de l'art français, Paris, 1930, XIII éd.
- (in French) Étienne Moreau-Nélaton, Manet raconté par lui-même, vol. 2, t. I and II, Paris, Henri Laurens, 1926.
- (in French) Henri Loyrette and Gary Tinterow, Impressionnisme : Les origines, 1859-1869, 476 p. (ISBN 978-2711828203).
- (in French) Collectif RMN, Manet inventeur du moderne, Paris, 2011, 297 p. (ISBN 978-2-07-013323-9)
