= The House at Rueil =

Paintings by Édouard Manet

- La maison du Rueil (French)
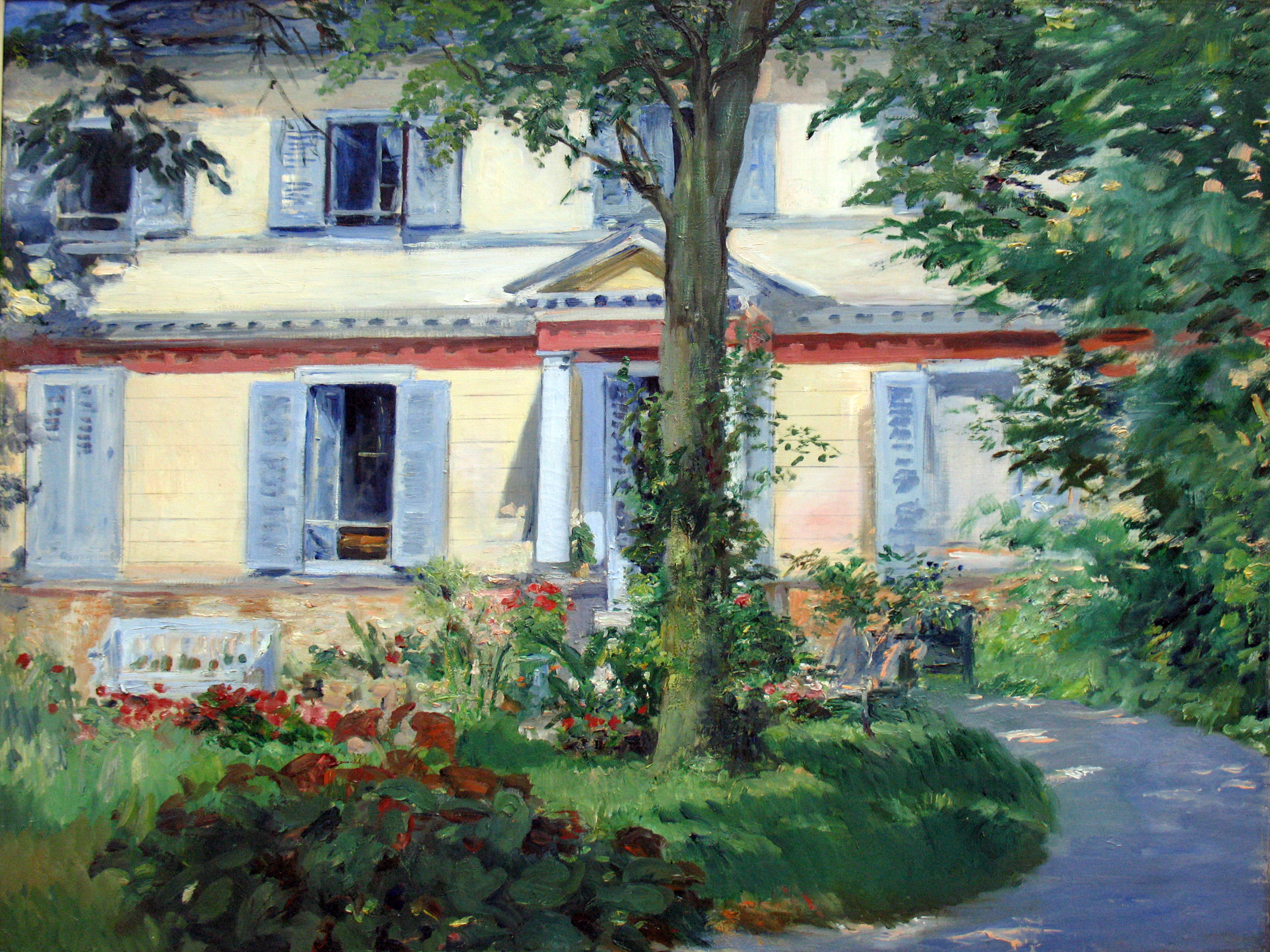
- Artist: Édouard Manet
- Year: 1882
- Medium: Oil on canvas
- Dimensions: 71.5 cm × 92.3 cm (28.1 in × 36.3 in)
- Location: Alte Nationalgalerie, Berlin, Germany

The House at Rueil
- La maison du Rueil (French)
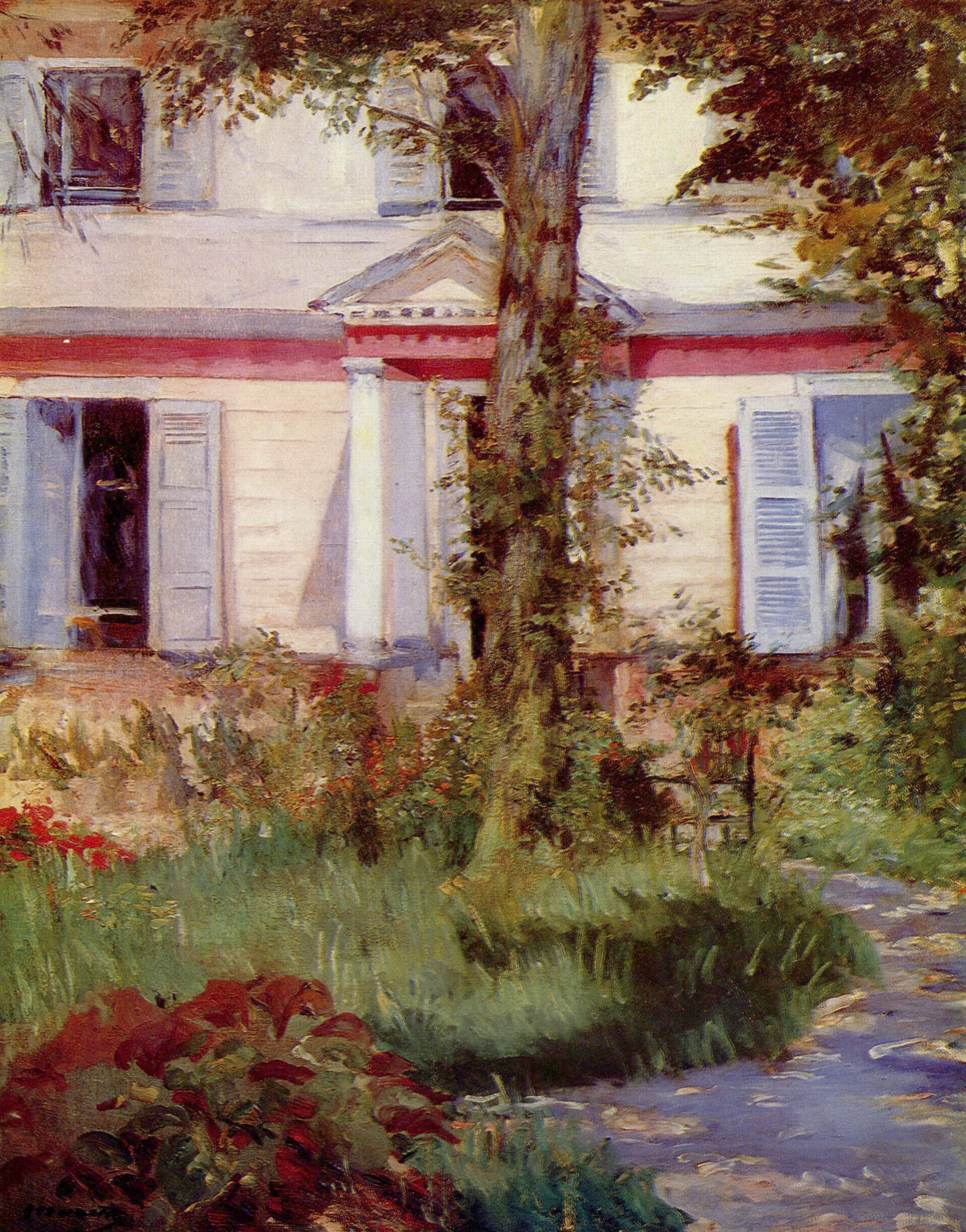
- Artist: Édouard Manet
- Year: 1882
- Medium: Oil on canvas
- Dimensions: 92.8 cm × 73.5 cm (36.5 in × 28.9 in)
- Location: National Gallery of Victoria, Melbourne, Australia

The House at Rueil (La maison du Rueil) is the title of two oil-on-canvas paintings by Édouard Manet completed in 1882. The paintings depict a view of the house where Manet and his family stayed for a few months before his death. The two versions are almost identical, but one is in landscape format, and the other is portrait format. The landscape version measures 71.5 × 92.3 cm and is in the collection of the Alte Nationalgalerie in Berlin, Germany, whereas the portrait version measures 92.8 × 73.5 cm and is at the National Gallery of Victoria in Melbourne, Australia. The composition shows typical characteristics of Impressionism and influenced various painters in the early 20th century who created similar works based on this model.

== Overview ==
The paintings depict the front of a house at Rue du Château No. 18 in Rueil-Malmaison in the suburbs of Paris, in which Manet and his family stayed during the summer (July to October) of 1882. He rented the house from André Labiche, who was possibly a relative of the comedy poet Eugène Labiche. Manet was very ill at the time. From his letters of the period, he suffered from depression and a sense of hopelessness, and indeed he would die less than a year after these paintings were completed. However, despite his infirmity, Manet remained productive and in the same letters complained that inclement weather limited his painting activity.

Manet's portrayal of the house at Rueil was not intended as a faithful architectural rendition but instead is focused only on a section of the front façade of the two-story structure. This view is further limited by a tree trunk that deliberately cuts through the center of the field of view and obscures the entryway to the house, which may or may not be open, with the ambiguity adding to the viewer's attention and appeal. The setting is on a hot summer day with bright sunlight, but with a sense of cooling shade provided by the tree, which extends out of the field of view to the top of the canvas. The walls of the house are light yellow and the window shutters are light blue. In the Berlin version, some shutters are open and others are closed; in the version in Melbourne all the shutters are open. In either version, some of the windows are open; others are closed by window shutters or curtains. In the Berlin version, only part of the dark blue roof can be seen, the rest is cut off from the upper edge of the picture. A lighter shade of blue in the upper left corner could suggest the sky. In the Melbourne version, the picture ends on the second floor; the roof area is completely cut off from the upper edge of the picture. Overall, the version in Melbourne shows a narrower section of the house compared to the Berlin version, especially on the left side, where the Berlin version shows further windows. The Berlin version also shows a bench positioned in front of the house and a garden bench to the right, both of which are missing in the Melbourne version. Both images have a chair to the right of the entry with what appears to be a blanket or coat draped across it.

It is not known which of the two versions of the picture Manet painted first. The authors of the 1975 catalog raisonné, Denis Rouart and Daniel Wildenstein, refer to the portrait version of the Melbourne Museum as “Réplique”, alleging that Manet would have initially executed the landscape format Berlin version. However, the painting in Berlin is unmarked, whereas the version kept in Melbourne is signed and dated, which indicates that Manet considered it to be completed.

== See also ==
- List of paintings by Édouard Manet
