= Masked Ball at the Opera House =

Painting by Édouard Manet

- Artist: Édouard Manet
- Year: 1873
- Medium: oil on canvas
- Dimensions: 59.0 cm × 72.5 cm (23.2 in × 28.5 in)
- Location: National Gallery of Art, Washington, D.C.

Masked Ball at the Opera House (French - Bal masqué à l'opéra) is a painting by Édouard Manet, produced in spring 1873. It is now in the National Gallery of Art, in Washington, D.C., to which it was offered by Mrs. H. Havemayer in 1982.

The artist made his preparatory sketches for it from life at an opera house at 12 rue Le Peletier in the 9th arrondissement of Paris - this building was reduced to rubble by a fire later that year. He then produced the painting in his studio on rue d'Amsterdam, to which he had moved shortly before. Its subject is reminiscent of the same artist's Music in the Tuileries (1863) - several of his friends posed for both works in his studio, notably the art collector Hecht and the composer Emmanuel Chabrier for Ball.

Stéphane Mallarmé commented "In the picture, the masks are no more than a break from the several tons of fresh bouquets, the possible monotony of the background of black clothes". It was adjudged to be too naturalist and so was refused by the 1874 Paris Salon. It later belonged to the famous opera singer Jean-Baptiste Faure, a major collector of Manet's works. He owned it until he was 67.

== See also ==
- List of paintings by Édouard Manet
- 1873 in art
