= White Lilacs in a Glass Vase =

1882 painting by Édouard Manet

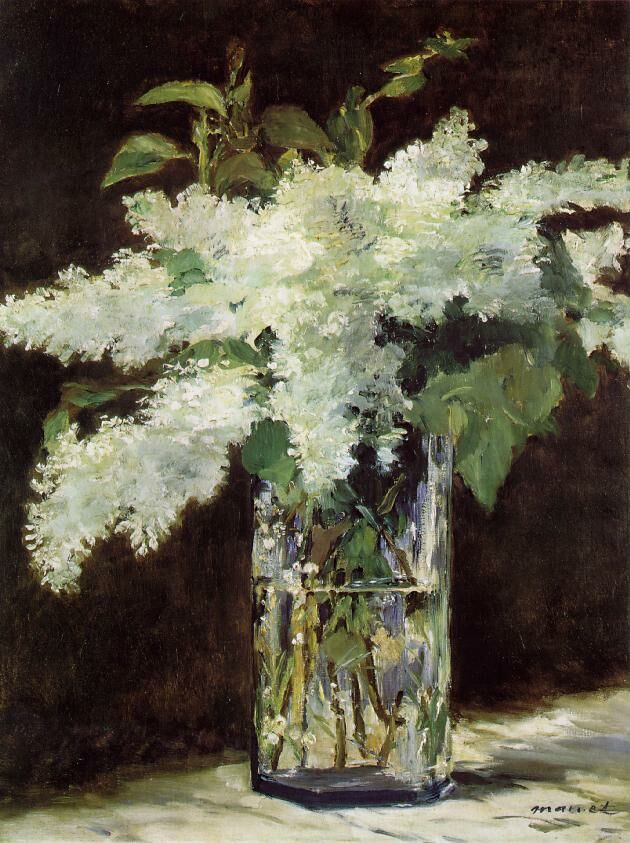
- Artist: Édouard Manet
- Year: 1882
- Medium: oil on canvas
- Dimensions: 54 cm × 42 cm (21 in × 17 in)
- Location: Alte Nationalgalerie, Berlin

White Lilacs in a Glass Vase (German: Der Fliederstrauß; French: Lilas blanc dans un vase de verre) is an 1882 oil-on-canvas painting by Édouard Manet, now in the Alte Nationalgalerie, in Berlin. Showing cuttings of white lilacs in a glass vase, it is one of a series of flower still lifes by the painter.

== See also ==
- List of paintings by Édouard Manet
- 1882 in art
