= The Matador Saluting =

1866-67 painting by Édouard Manet

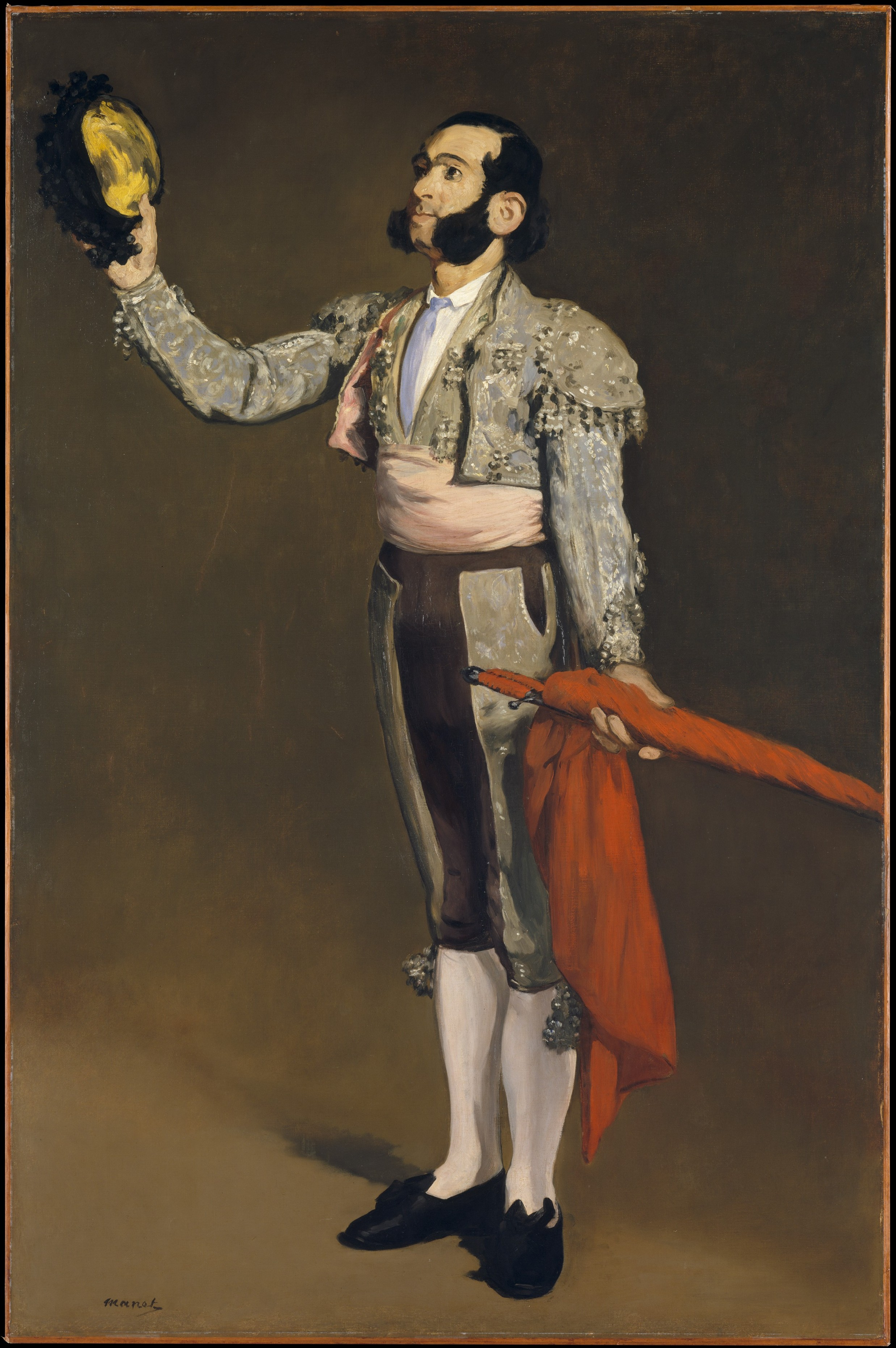
- Artist: Édouard Manet
- Year: 1866 or 1867
- Medium: oil on canvas
- Dimensions: 171 cm × 113 cm (67 in × 44 in)
- Location: Metropolitan Museum of Art, New York

The Matador Saluting (French - Le Matador saluant ) is an oil-on-canvas painting produced by Édouard Manet between 1866 and 1867. Its precise date is unclear – Charles S. Moffett dates the first definite reference to the work to 1867, at an exhibition devoted to Manet's works at the pavillon de l'Alma.

Étienne Moreau-Nélaton and Adolphe Tabarant agree that Manet's brother Eugène was the model for the work. It was one of the works by Manet which were refused by the Paris Salon of 1866. The prefect allowed the artist to exhibit these works in his studio instead so long as he did not open the doors to the studio too wide. It shows a matador or torero receiving the crowd's applause after killing a bull, though the work's first buyer Théodore Duret instead argued that it shows a matador asking the crowd's permission to kill the bull.

Unlike the fantasy of Miss V Dressed as a Bullfighter, The Matador Saluting was produced after the artist's 1865 trip to Spain and shows his admiration for the country and its art. Charles S. Moffet argues that the work shows the inspiration Manet drew from the compositions and palette of Diego Velázquez and Francisco de Zurbarán. It was Manet's first large format work. Louisine Havemeyer hesitated before buying the work from Duret, fearing the painting's size would not be convenient for her husband, but eventually decided to buy it after Mary Cassatt affirmed that "It was exactly the format Manet wanted". In fact, Henry Osborne Havemeyer became obsessed with large format works and also bought Young Man Dressed as a Majo, another work from the artist's Spanish period. The two works were left to the Metropolitan Museum of Art in New York in 1929. Miss V Dressed as a Bullfighter is also there.

== Gallery ==
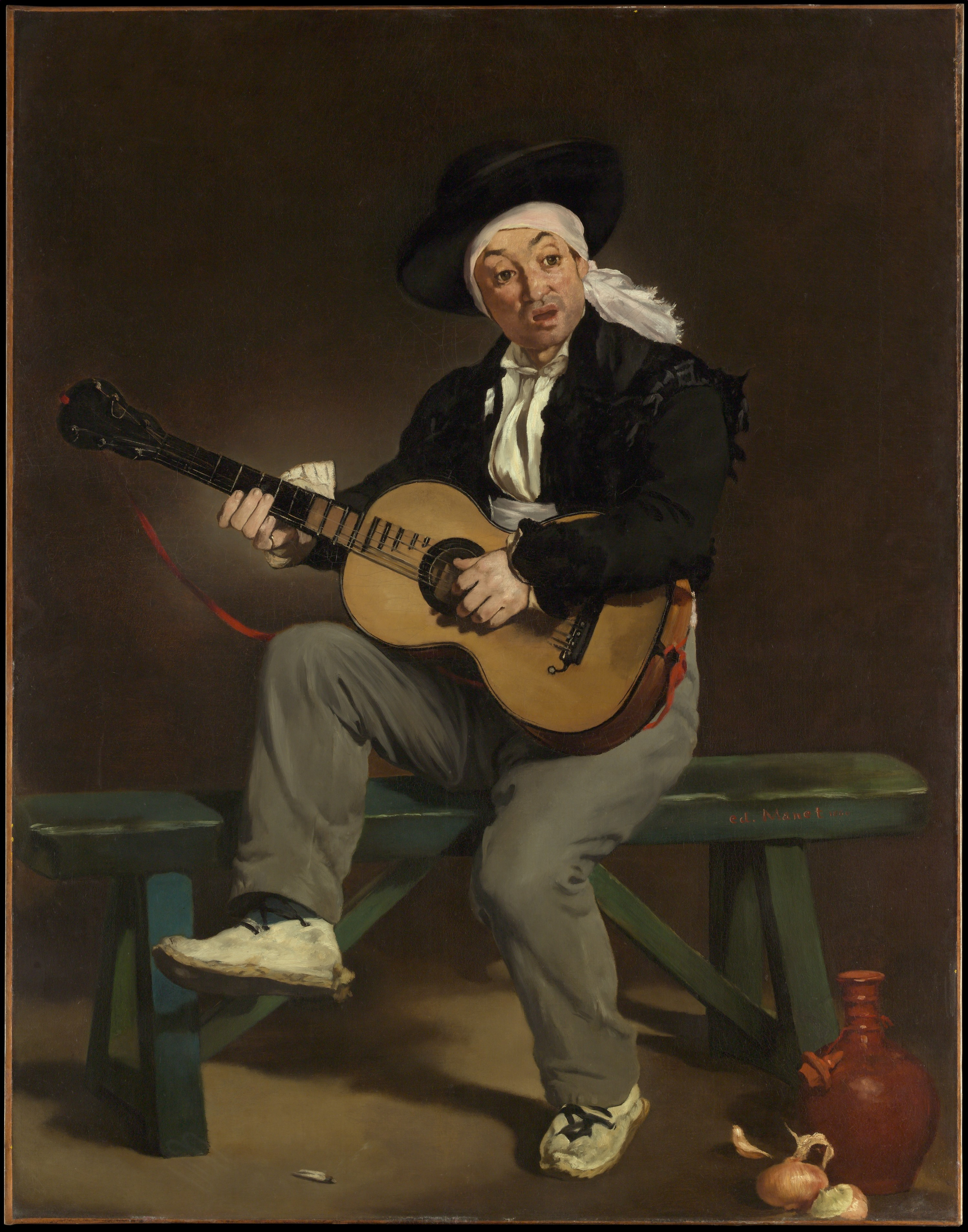
The Spanish Singer, 1860

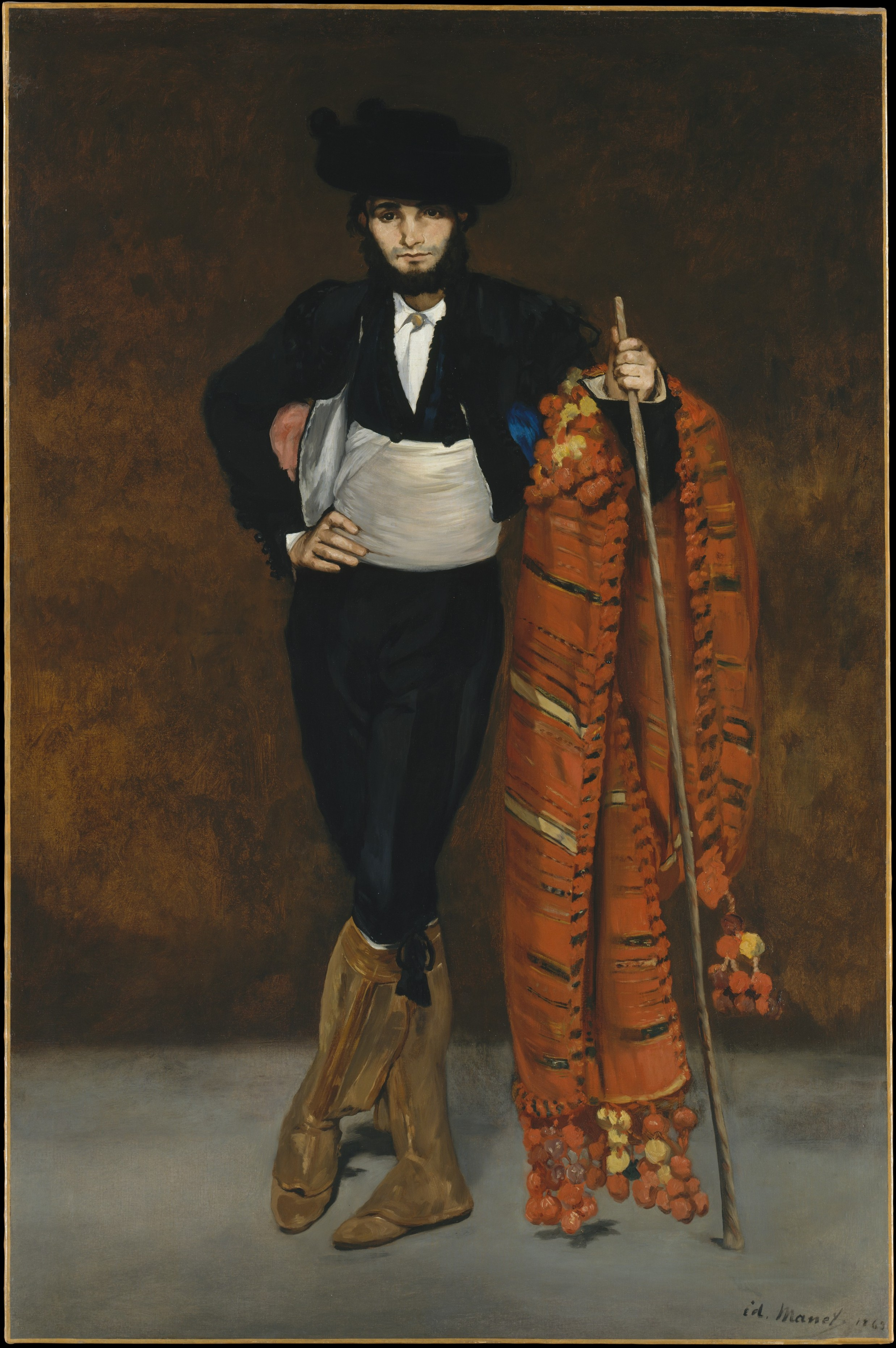
Young Man Dressed as a Majo, 1863

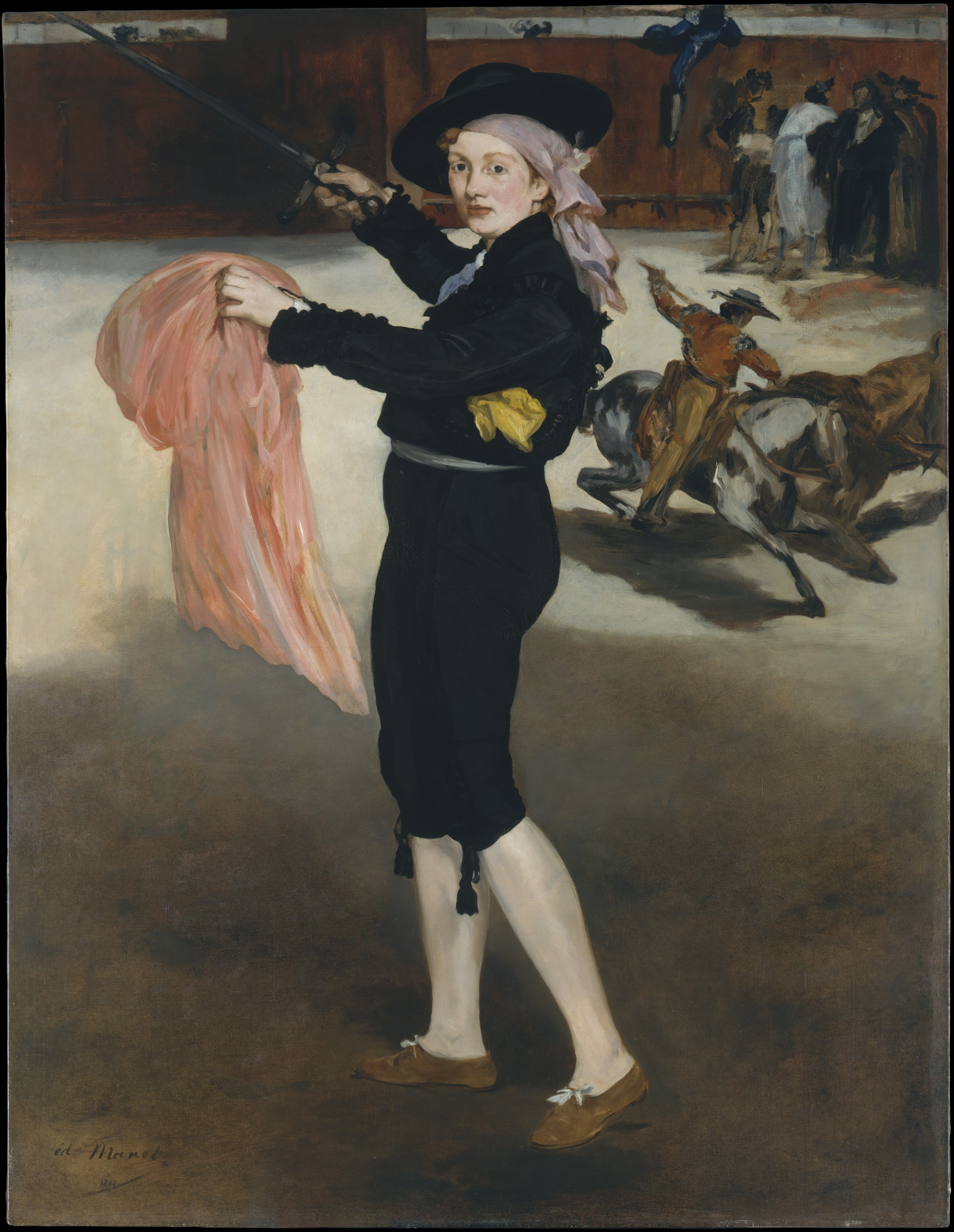
Miss V Dressed as a Bullfighter, 1862

== Bibliography ==
- Cachin, Françoise; Moffett, Charles S.; Wilson-Bareau, Juliet (1983), Manet 1832-1883 (in French), Paris: Réunion des musées nationaux, ISBN 2-7118-0230-2
- Duret, Théodore (1902), Histoire de Manet et de son œuvre (in French), Paris: Charpentier et Fasquelle
- Havemeyer, Louisine (1993) [1961], Susan Alyson Stein (ed.), Sixteen to sixty: Memoirs of a collector, New York, ISBN 1-883145-00-7
- Moreau-Nélaton, Étienne (1926), Manet raconté par lui-même (in French), Paris: Henri Laurens
- Tabarant, Adolphe (1930), Les Manet de la collection Havemeyer: La Renaissance de l'art français (in French) (XIII ed.), Paris
- Tabarant, Adolphe (1947), Manet et ses œuvres (in French), Paris: Gallimard

== See also ==
- List of paintings by Édouard Manet
- The museum's Catalogue entry
