= Young Man Dressed as a Majo =

1863 painting by Édouard Manet

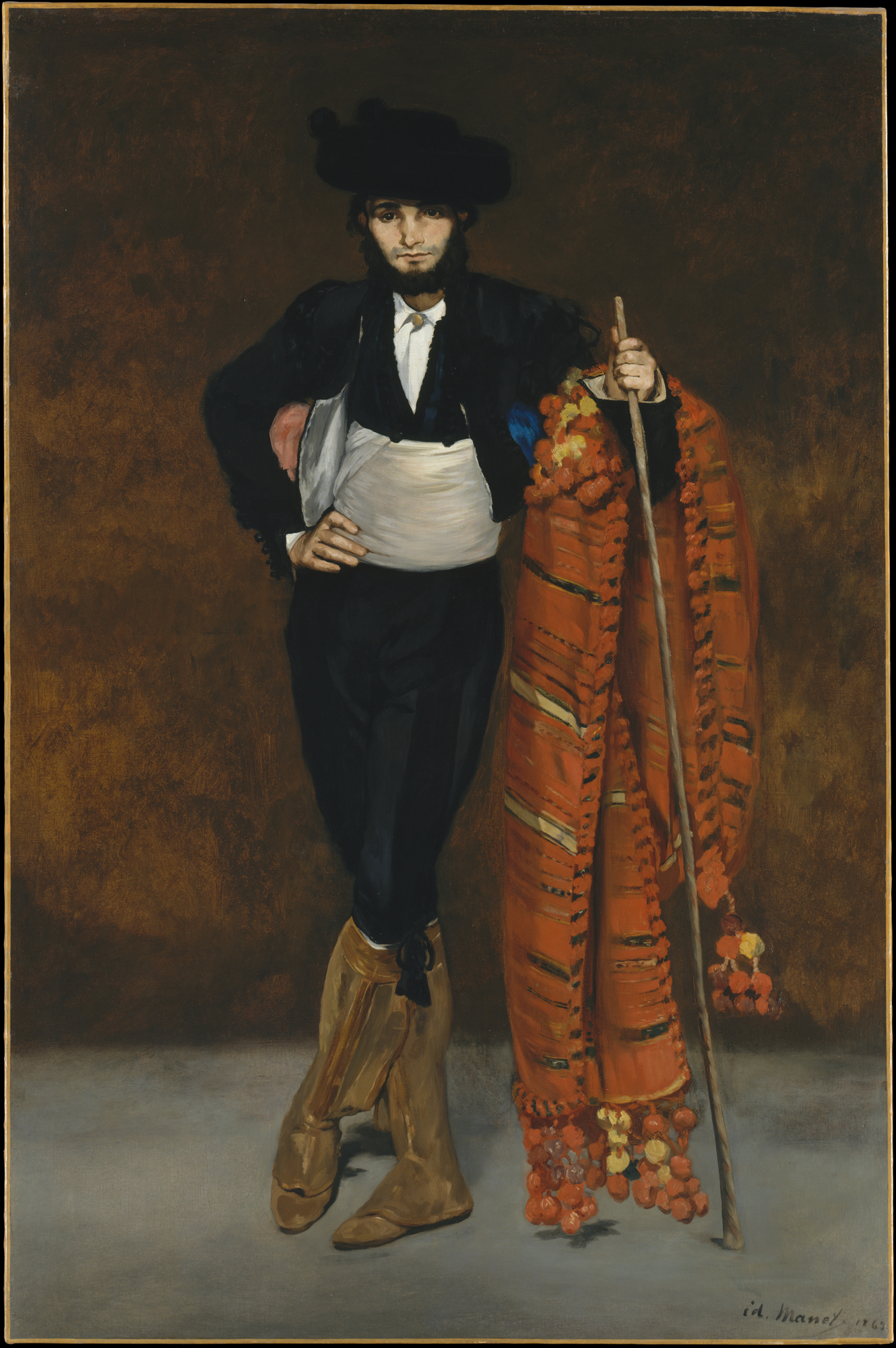
- Artist: Édouard Manet
- Year: 1863
- Medium: oil on canvas
- Dimensions: 188 cm × 125 cm (74 in × 49 in)
- Location: Metropolitan Museum of Art; New York

Young Man Dressed as a Majo is an oil on canvas painting by Édouard Manet, executed in 1863, first exhibited at that year's Salon des Refusés alongside Déjeuner sur l'herbe and Miss V Dressed as a Bullfighter. It is typical of the artist's Spanish period, when he was strongly influenced by Diego Velázquez and other Spanish art.

The model was Manet's youngest brother Gustave, shown in the outfit of the dashing young Spaniards known colloquially as majos. It is now in the Metropolitan Museum of Art.

== See also ==
- List of paintings by Édouard Manet
- 1863 in art
