= Spring (Manet) =

Painting by Édouard Manet

- Le Printemps (French)
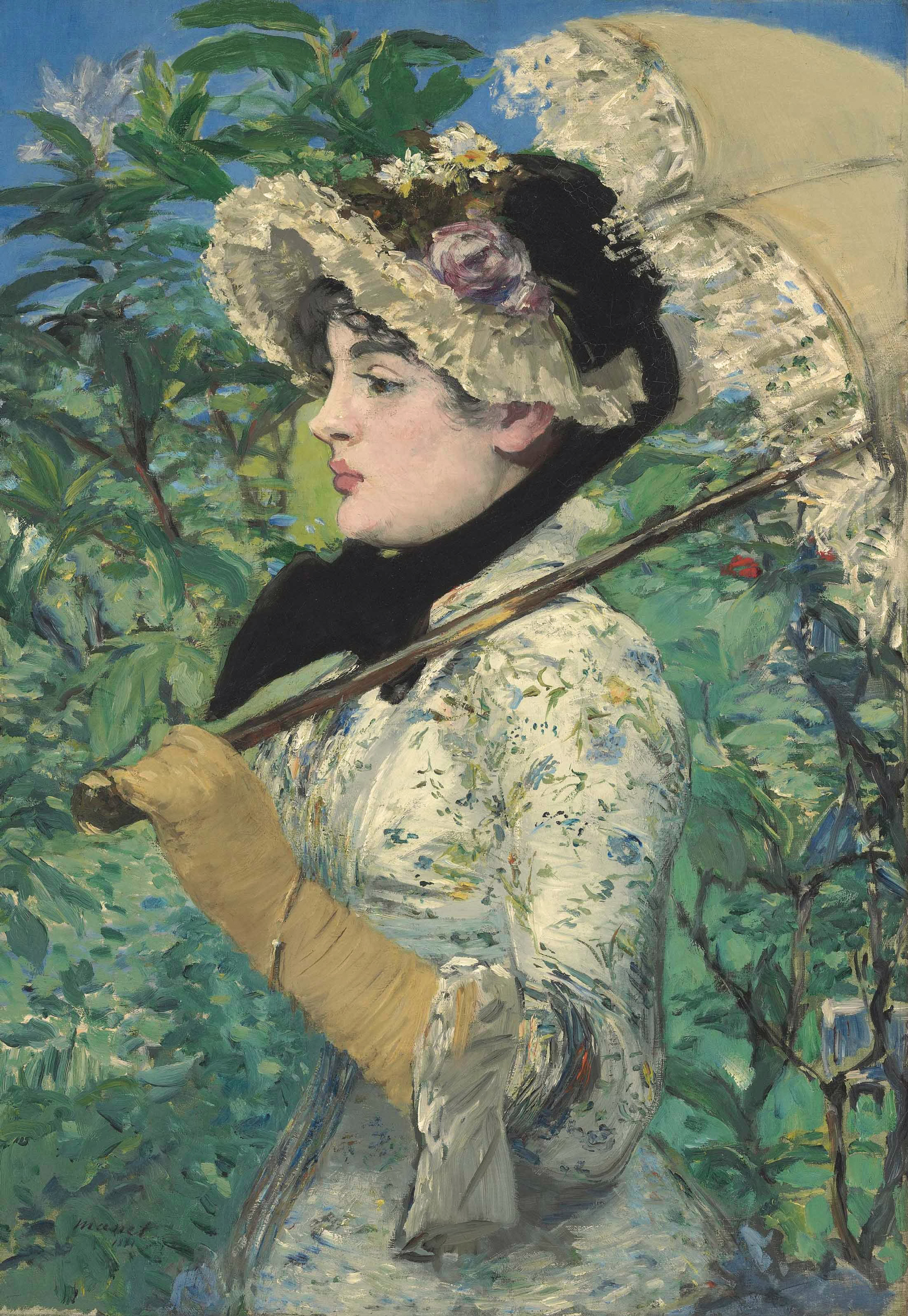
- Artist: Édouard Manet
- Year: 1881
- Catalogue: 2014.62
- Medium: Oil on canvas
- Dimensions: 74 cm × 51.5 cm (29.1 in × 20.3 in)
- Location: J. Paul Getty Museum, Los Angeles

Spring is an 1881 oil-on-canvas painting by Édouard Manet. It debuted at the Paris Salon of 1882 and was considered the greatest and final public success of Manet's Salon career. It depicts Parisian actress Jeanne Demarsy in a floral dress with parasol and bonnet against a background of lush foliage and blue sky, as the embodiment of Spring. The painting also became the first work of art ever to be published in color.

== Background ==
Spring was the first of a planned quartet of allegorical works using chic Parisian women to depict the four seasons. The idea came from Manet's friend, Antonin Proust, who suggested a series of seasons personified by contemporary ideals of women, fashion and beauty. The series was never finished and Manet died a year after finishing only the second of the series, Autumn.

== Auction ==
In November 2014, the J. Paul Getty Museum paid more than $65 million for the painting, surpassing the previous record of $33.2 million for a Manet which was paid for Self Portrait With a Palette in 2010.

== See also ==
- List of most expensive paintings
- List of paintings by Édouard Manet
- 1881 in art
