= Bullfight (Manet) =

Painting by Édouard Manet

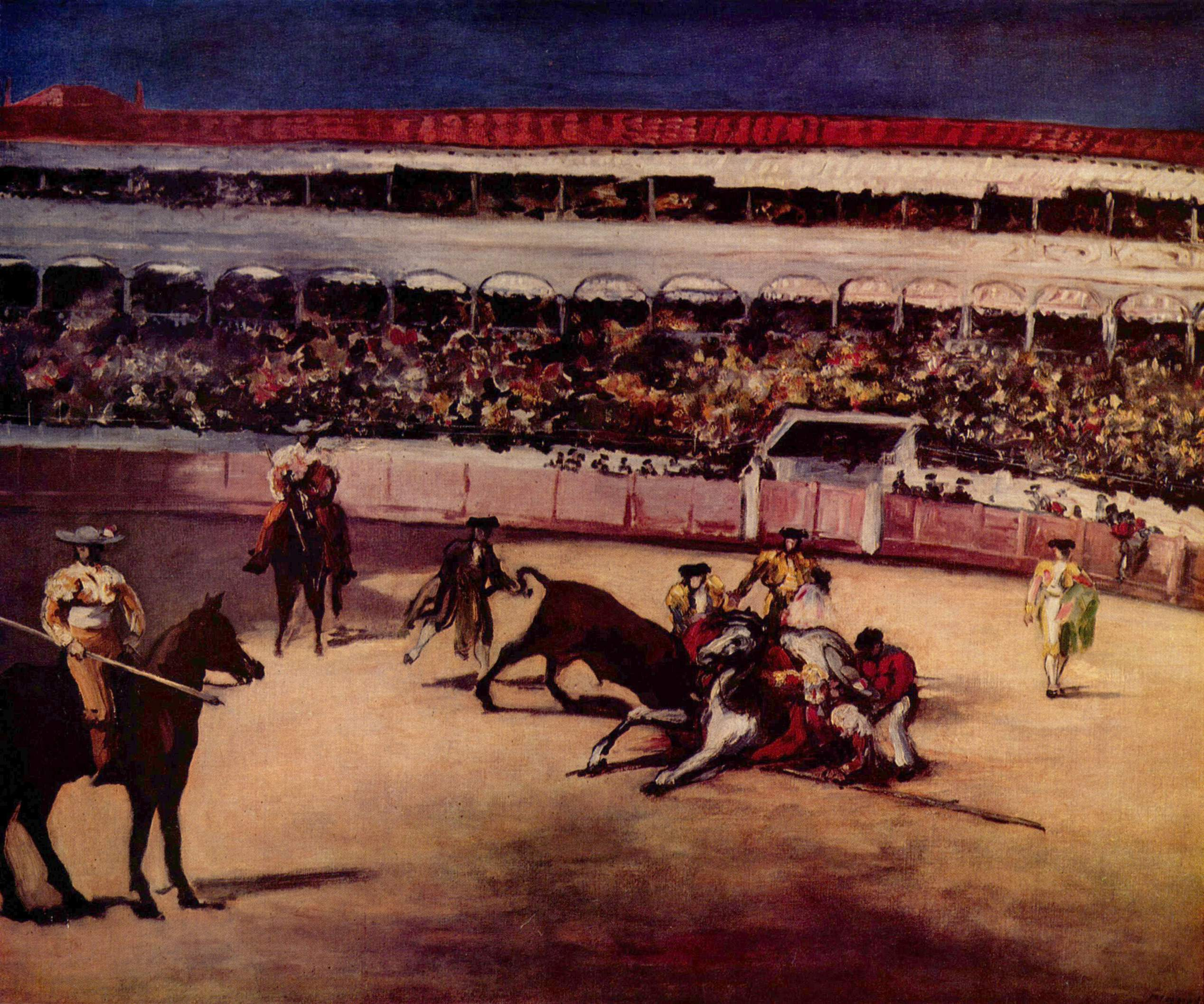
- Artist: Édouard Manet
- Year: 1865–1866
- Medium: oil on canvas
- Dimensions: 89 cm × 109.2 cm (35 in × 43.0 in)
- Location: Musée d'Orsay; Paris

Bullfight (French - Combat de taureau ) is an 1865–1866 painting by Édouard Manet, now in the Musée d'Orsay in Paris. It was produced after the artist's trip to Spain in 1865 and forms part of his Spanish period (1862–1867).

The painting depicts a rare event in the Spanish bullfight, when the bull manages to attack and bring down the horse. Admired and backed by Charles Baudelaire and Émile Zola, the work was so strongly attacked by other art critics that Manet kept it in his studio until 1872, when the Frères Goncourt praised it.

== See also ==
- List of paintings by Édouard Manet

== Bibliography ==
- Cachin, Françoise; Moffett, Charles S.; Wilson-Bareau, Juliet (1983). Manet 1832–1883, Paris, Réunion des musées nationaux. [Paris]: Ministère de la Culture. p. 544. ISBN 978-2-7118-0230-2.
- Adolphe Tabarant, Manet et ses œuvres, Paris, Gallimard, 1947, 600 p.
- Édouard Manet, Lettres d'Édouard Manet sur son voyage en Espagne, Paris, Arts, 16 mars 1945
- Claude Pichois et Jean Ziegler, Baudelaire, correspondance. Vol. 2, t. II. Paris: Gallimard. 1973.
- Zola, Émile (1867). Revue. Paris: Dentu.
- Sophie Monneret, L'Impressionnisme et son époque, vol. 2, t. 1, Paris, Robert Laffont, 1987, 997 p. (ISBN 978-2-221-05412-3)
