= Mademoiselle V. in the Costume of an Espada =

1862 painting by Édouard Manet

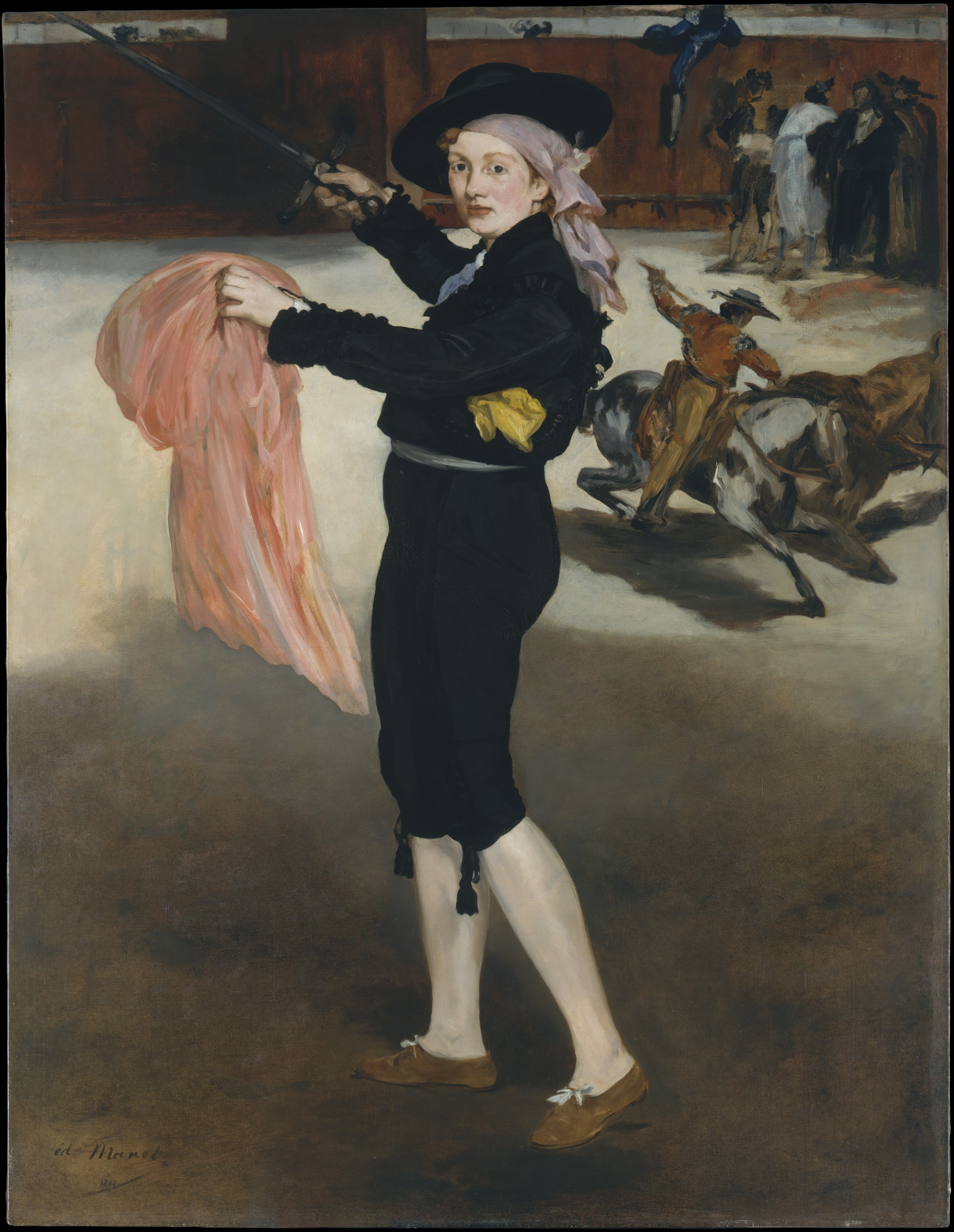
- Artist: Édouard Manet
- Year: 1862
- Medium: Oil on canvas
- Dimensions: 165.1 cm × 127.6 cm (65 in × 50 1/4 in)
- Location: Metropolitan Museum of Art, New York

Mademoiselle V. in the Costume of an Espada is an 1862 oil-on-canvas painting by French artist Édouard Manet. The painting is in the collection of the Metropolitan Museum of Art, having been acquired in 1929. Manet exhibited the painting at the 1863 Salon des Refusés alongside Jeune Homme en costume de majo and Le Déjeuner sur l'herbe. It is often cited as an example of Manet's work being influenced by Spanish art.

== Subject matter ==
The painting shows Victorine Meurent dressed as an espada, a Spanish bullfighter. Meurent is set in a bullring, with a bull about to attack a picador mounted on a horse in the background. The sword in Meurent's right hand suggests that she is prepared to kill the bull. Meurent is staring directly at the viewer rather than the bull. In the far back of the painting are a group of toreros who watch while keeping a safe distance. Meurent carries a pink cape that is not the traditional muleta color a male bullfighter would carry; her shoes are likewise untraditional.

== Manet's influences ==
Manet's Mademoiselle V. in the Costume of an Espada is the product of a combination of influences. The scene in the background is reminiscent of Spanish artist Francisco Goya's series of prints known as the Tauromaquia. Manet borrowed several elements from Goya's elements with little modification. The mounted picador on the horse is copied directly from plate 5 of the Tauromaquia, which is also referenced in the group of toreros and the bull. Manet departed from Goya in positioning Victorine Meurent and in updating the picador with contemporary attire.

Meurent as the female bullfighter is more closely modeled after the Italian artist Marcantonio Raimondi's set of engravings with allegories of Virtue, specifically the figures of Temperance and Justice. The pose of Temperance resembles Meurent's stance, whereas the position of the sword in Justice is similar to that of Manet's painting.

== Themes ==
The painting, like many works by Manet, addresses the theme of artifice. The scene shown in the painting is fictional, with Meurent having posed in a studio. The themes of "dressing-up" and "make-believe" are central to Manet's work. In an effort to shift focus from subject matter to interest in the painting alone, Manet pushed for his work to be recognized as fiction. The title of the painting itself highlights this theme of artifice by explicitly revealing that Meurent is a model posing in a costume.

Throughout Manet's early paintings, he made clear that he borrowed motifs, settings, and figures adopted from earlier works by other artists. He especially drew from the works of old masters such as Titian, whose Venus of Urbino informed Manet's Olympia. The combination of artifice with borrowings from the works of earlier artists is distinctive of Manet's style.

== Modern scholarship ==
In the 1980s, The Metropolitan Museum of Art conducted research on the painting using X-radiography. The X-radiograph showed a female nude figure beneath the composition of Meurent(View). This female nude was upside down and shows great similarity to one of the nude females in François Boucher's Diane sortant du bain.

== See also ==
- List of paintings by Édouard Manet
