= 1879 in art =

Events from the year 1879 in art.

== Events ==
- April 10 – May 11 – Fourth Impressionist exhibition in Paris, arranged by Gustave Caillebotte at 28 avenue de l'Opéra.
- May 5 – The Royal Academy Exhibition of 1879 opens at Burlington House in London
- May 12 – The Salon of 1879 opens in Paris
- Ford Madox Brown begins painting The Manchester Murals in Manchester Town Hall (England).
- Chicago Academy of Fine Arts established.
- Guimet Museum of Asian art established in Lyon, France.
- Museum of Fine Arts Berne established in Switzerland.
- Kate Greenaway's first book, with her own colour illustrations, Under the Window: Pictures & Rhymes for Children, is published in London.

== Works ==
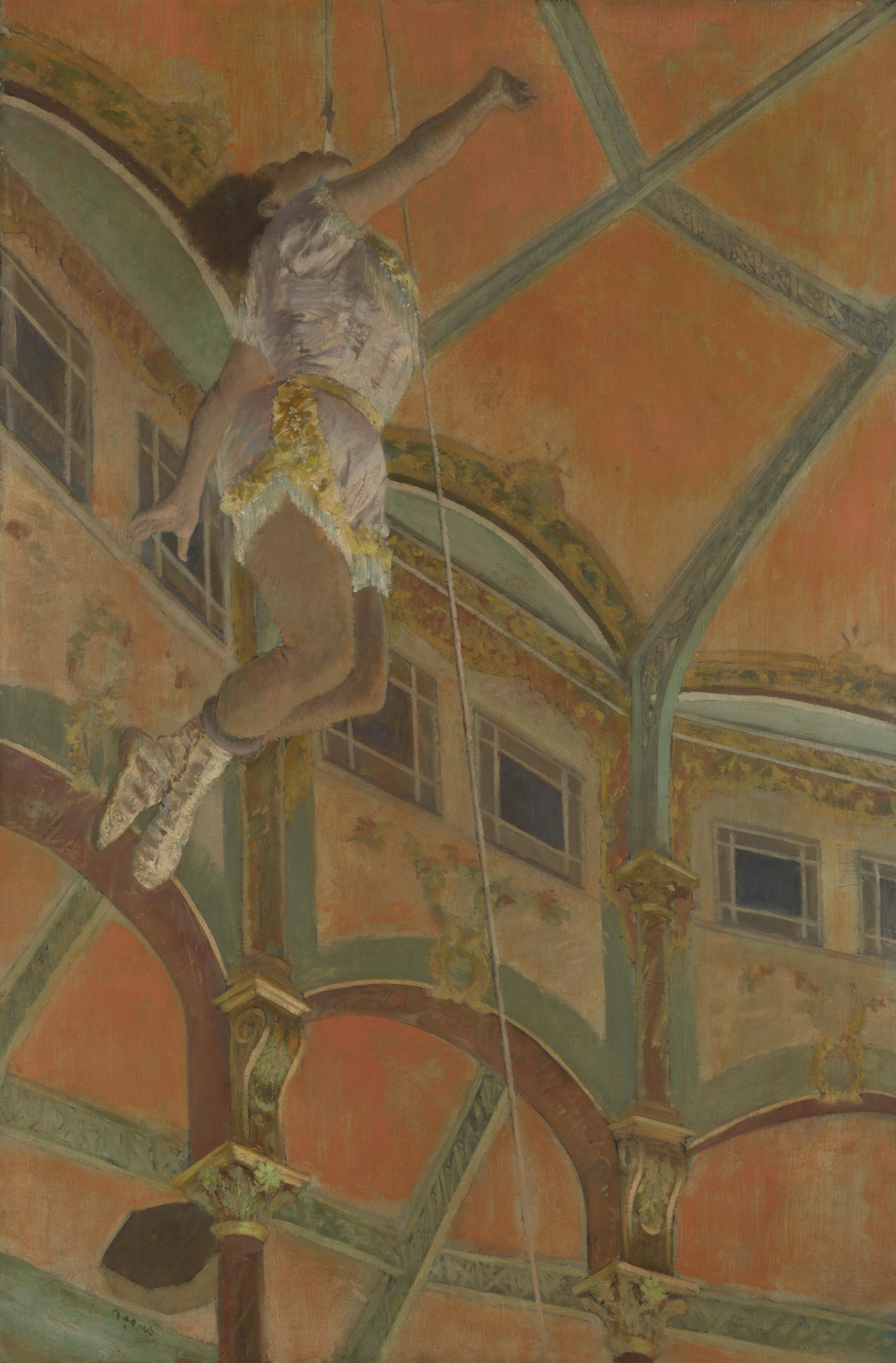
Edgar Degas – Miss La La at the Cirque Fernando

- Michael Ancher – Vil han klare pynten (Will he round the point)
- Albert Fitch Bellows – The Parsonage
- Léon Bonnat – Portrait of Victor Hugo
- William-Adolphe Bouguereau – The Birth of Venus
- William Burges – Golden Bed
- Edward Burne-Jones – The Annunciation
- John Ward Dunsmore – Portrait of Thomas Couture (1815–1879) on His Deathbed (chalk on paper mounted on canvas)
- Edgar Degas
  - The Dance Lesson (approximate date)
  - Diego Martelli
  - Jockeys Before the Race
  - Miss La La at the Cirque Fernando
  - Portrait of Edmond Duranty
  - Portrait of Henri Michel-Lévy in his studio
  - Portraits at the Stock Exchange
- Gustave Achille Guillaumet – Laghouat in the Algerian Sahara
- Ivan Kramskoi – Mikhail Saltykov-Shchedrin
- Jules Joseph Lefebvre – Diana Surprised
- George Dunlop Leslie – Alice in Wonderland
- John Seymour Lucas – The Gordon Riots
- Édouard Manet
  - ‘’Chez le Père Lathuille’’
  - The Café-Concert
  - Self-Portrait with Palette
  - In the Conservatory
- John Everett Millais
  - Cherry Ripe
  - Portrait of Louise Jopling
  - Portrait of William Ewart Gladstone
  - Princess Elizabeth in Prison at St James's
- Albert Joseph Moore – Topaz
- Henry Nelson O'Neil – My Native Land, Goodbye
- Vasily Perov – Pugachev's Judgement
- Pierre-Auguste Renoir – The Dreamer
- John Singer Sargent
  - In the Luxembourg Gardens (Luxembourg Gardens at Twilight)
  - Portrait of Carolus-Duran
- Charlotte Schreiber – The Croppy Boy (The Confession of an Irish Patriot)
- James Tissot – Mrs. Newton with a Parasol (approximate date)

== Births ==
- January 13 – William Reid Dick, Scottish sculptor (died 1961)
- March 27 – Edward Steichen, American photographer, painter, and art gallery and museum curator (died 1973)
- June 4 – Mabel Lucie Attwell, English illustrator (died 1964)
- July 26 – Maria Bal, Polish model (died 1955)
- September 23 – Charles Camoin, French painter (died 1965)
- October 22 – Sir Matthew Smith, English painter (died 1959)
- November 18 – Sybil Pye, English bookbinder (died 1958)
- December 18 – Paul Klee, Swiss painter (died 1940)

== Deaths ==
- January 26 – Julia Margaret Cameron, British photographer in Ceylon (born 1815)
- February 10 – Honoré Daumier, French painter, sculptor and caricaturist (born 1808)
- March 21 – Valentine Bartholomew, English flower painter (born 1799)
- March 27 – Hércules Florence, French-born Brazilian painter and pioneer photographer (born 1817)
- March 30 – Thomas Couture, French painter and art teacher (born 1815)
- May 8 – Henry Collen, English royal miniature portrait painter (born 1797)
- June 24 – Eliseo Sala, Italian painter (born 1813)
- July 7 – George Caleb Bingham, American realist artist (born 1811)
- July 16 – Frederick Langenheim, German-born American photographer (born 1809)
- July 17 – Maurycy Gottlieb, Polish Jewish painter (born 1804)
- August 3 – Joseph Severn, English portrait and subject painter (born 1793)
- September 5 – Camille Doncieux, French first wife and model of Claude Monet (born 1847)
- September 6 – Amédée de Noé, French caricaturist (born 1818)
- September 8 – William Morris Hunt, American painter (born 1824)
- November 2 – Abbondio Sangiorgio, Italian sculptor (born 1798)
- November 18 – André Giroux, French painter and photographer (born 1801)
- December 1 – Franz Ittenbach, German religious painter (born 1813)
- date unknown – Chō Kōran, Japanese poet and nanga artist (born 1804)
