= Portrait of Marguerite Gauthier-Lathuille =

Painting by Édouard Manet

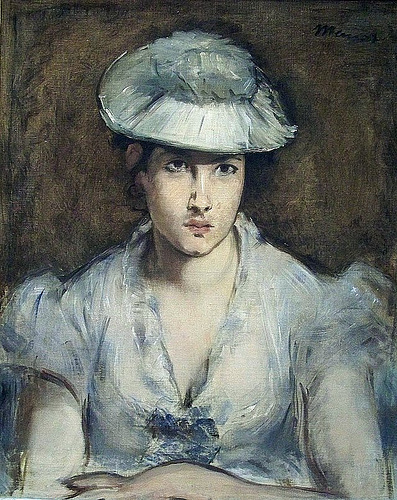
- Artist: Édouard Manet
- Year: c. 1878
- Medium: oil on canvas
- Dimensions: 81 cm × 50 cm (32 in × 20 in)
- Location: Museum of Fine Arts of Lyon , Lyon, France

Portrait of Marguerite Gauthier-Lathuille or Young Woman in White is a half-length oil on canvas portrait by Édouard Manet, from c. 1878. It is held in the Musée des Beaux-Arts de Lyon, which acquired it in 1902. The sitter never posed for the final work, which was instead based on sketches made by the artist. The painting was intended as a present for her father.

In the 1870s Manet regularly attended the cabaret run by the subject's father on the avenue de Clichy in the Batignolles quarter of Paris, near the Café Guerbois, a hub for the Impressionists. In 1879 he showed him in the background of Chez le père Lathuille (Musée des Beaux-Arts de Tournai).

== See also ==
- List of paintings by Édouard Manet

== Sources ==
- Découvrir les collections
