= Chez le Père Lathuille =

1879 painting Édouard Manet

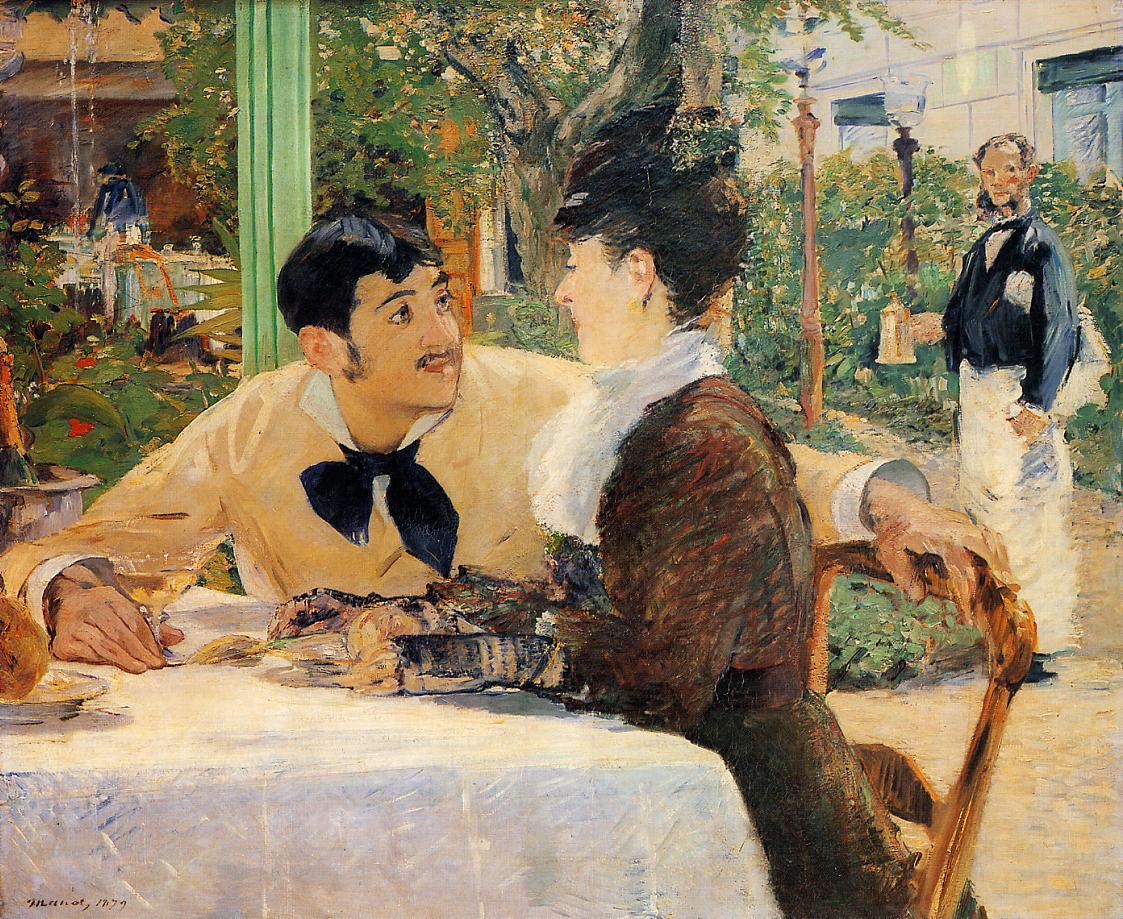
- Artist: Édouard Manet
- Year: 1879
- Medium: Oil on canvas
- Dimensions: 92 cm × 112 cm (36 in × 44 in)
- Location: Musée des Beaux-Arts Tournai, Tournai

Chez le Père Lathuille (At the Père Lathuille Restaurant) is an 1879 oil-on-canvas painting by Édouard Manet, now in the Musée des Beaux-Arts Tournai. In the background is the proprietor. Manet also painted a portrait of his daughter.

Père Lathuille's cabaret, and later restaurant, was situated in the Batignolles quarter, on the site now occupied by a cinema at 7 Avenue de Clichy, just after the Barrière de Clichy so as to escape Parisian wine taxes. During the defence of Paris on 30 March 1814, Marshal Bon-Adrien Jeannot de Moncey had used it as his command post. Just before the enemy arrived, Père Lathuille had handed out complimentary drinks to the soldiers, saying "Drink, my friends, drink for free - don't leave a single bottle of my wine in the casks".

== See also ==
- List of paintings by Édouard Manet
- 1879 in art
