= The Café-Concert =

Painting by Édouard Manet

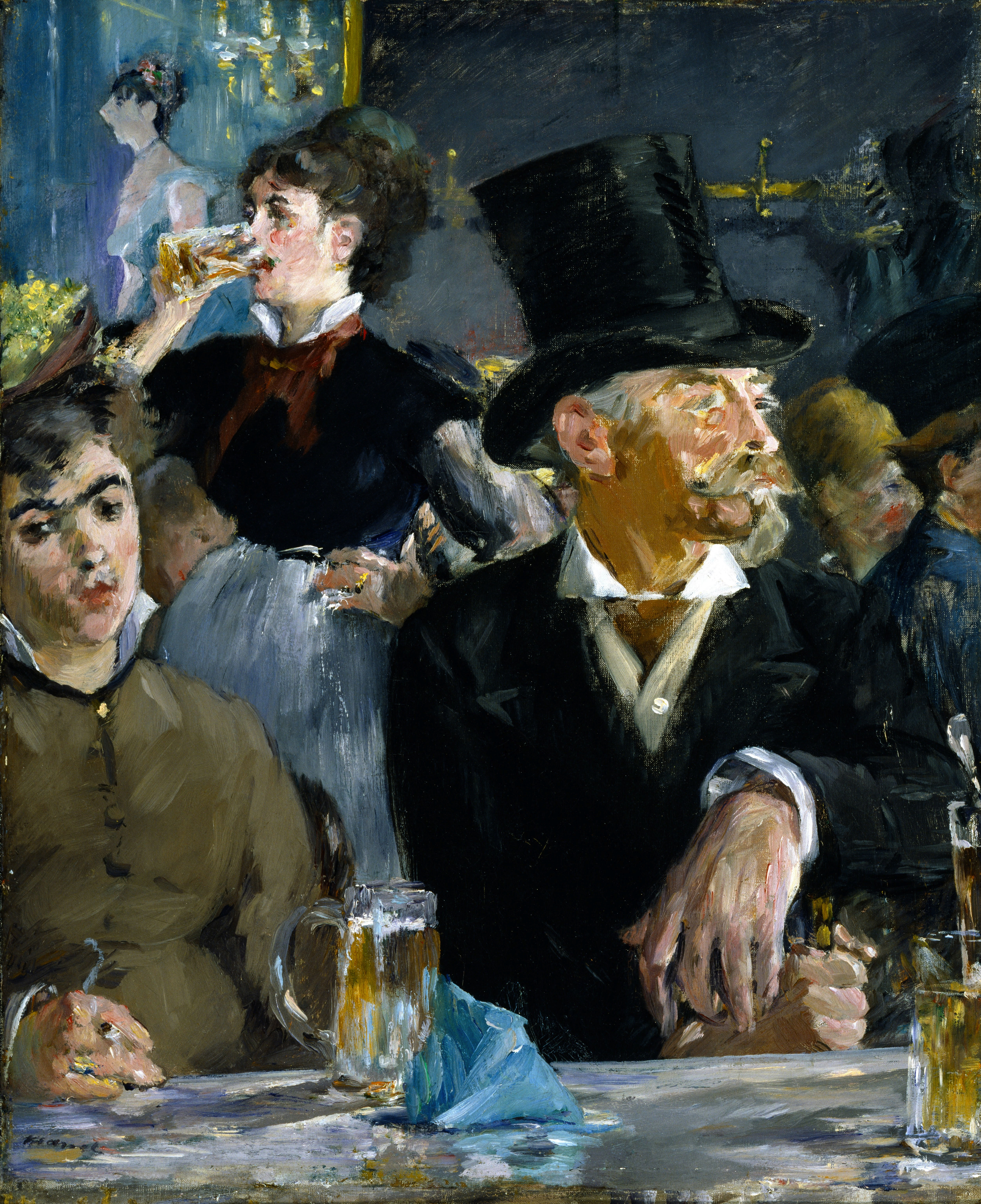
- Artist: Édouard Manet
- Year: c. 1879
- Medium: Oil on canvas
- Dimensions: 47.3 cm × 39.1 cm (18.6 in × 15.4 in)
- Location: The Walters Art Museum; Baltimore

The Café-Concert is an 1879 painting by the French painter Édouard Manet, who often captured café scenes depicting social life at the end of the nineteenth century similar to those depicted in this painting.

== History ==
The setting has been identified as the Brasserie Reichshoffen on the Boulevard Rochechouart. Manet shows us men and women in the new brasseries and cafes of Paris, which presents the viewer with an alternate view of new Parisian life. Manet claimed he was painting des oeuvres sinceres or "sincere works". The women depicted in these scenes were courting certain risks with regards to perception and morality.

== Composition ==
In The Café-Concert, Manet presents a café-concert in which three central figures form a triangle but are all engaged in opposite directions. The scene of a café-concert, supposedly casual, is hinted by Manet to be one of separation. The waitress enjoys a beer, while the woman at the table smokes a cigarette and appears subdued and the man appears to be at ease as he watches the performance (the singer known as “La Belle Polonaise” is reflected in the mirror in the background of the painting). It is noted that the man evokes confidence, because men unlike women could frequent cafés without insecurity. The painting was posed and completed in a studio but gives the appearance of being freshly observed.

== Analysis ==
In this painting, concepts of conventional composition are rejected. The figures of the individuals represented are not clearly defined but modeled with brushstrokes. The colors are placed directly on the canvas with loose, repetitive strokes instead of applying layers of pigments and glazes over a dark background.

== Off the Wall ==
A reproduction of The Café-Concert was featured in Off the Wall, an open-air exhibition on the streets of Baltimore, Maryland. A reproduction of the painting, the original is part of The Walters Art Museum collection, was on display at the CFG Community Bank (Fell's Point). The National Gallery in London began the concept of bringing art out of doors in 2007 and the Detroit Institute of Art introduced the concept in the U.S.. The Off the Wall reproductions of the Walters' paintings are done on weather-resistant vinyl and include a description of the painting and a QR code for smart phones.

== See also ==
- List of paintings by Édouard Manet
- 1879 in art

== Exhibition history ==
- From Ingres to Gauguin: French Nineteenth Century Paintings Owned in Maryland. Baltimore Museum of Art, Baltimore. 1951.
- From El Greco to Pollock: Early and Late Works by European and American Artists. Baltimore Museum of Art, Baltimore. 1968.
- Manet and Modern Paris. National Gallery of Art, Washington. 1982–1983.
- Manet, 1832–1883. Galeries nationales du Grand Palais, Paris; The Metropolitan Museum of Art, New York. 1983.
- The Taste of Maryland: Art Collecting in Maryland 1800–1934. The Walters Art Gallery, Baltimore. 1984.
- Manet's Working Methods. The Courtauld Gallery, London. 1986.
- Impressionism, the City and Modern Life. Ordrupgaard, Charlottenlund. 1996.
- Before Monet: Landscape Painting in France and Impressionist Masters: Highlights from The Walters Collection. The Walters Art Gallery, Baltimore. 1998.
- Vive la France! French Treasures from the Middle Ages to Monet. The Walters Art Gallery, Baltimore. 1999–2000.
- Highlights from the Collection. The Walters Art Gallery, Baltimore. 1998–2001.
- Triumph of French Painting: Masterpieces from Ingres to Matisse. Baltimore Museum of Art, Baltimore; Philbrook Museum of Art, Tulsa; Norton Museum of Art, West Palm Beach; Royal Academy of Arts, London; Albright-Knox Art Gallery, Buffalo; Dayton Art Institute, Dayton. 2000–2002.
- A Magnificent Age: Masterpieces from the Walters Art Museum, Baltimore. The Nelson-Atkins Museum of Art, Kansas City; Mint Museum of Art, Charlotte; The Walters Art Museum, Baltimore. 2002–2004.
- 19th Century Masterpieces from the Walters Art Museum. Santa Barbara Museum of Art, Santa Barbara; Jack S. Blanton Museum of Art, Austin. 2010–2011.
