= Self-Portrait with Palette (Manet) =

Painting by Édouard Manet

- Autoportrait à la palette (French)
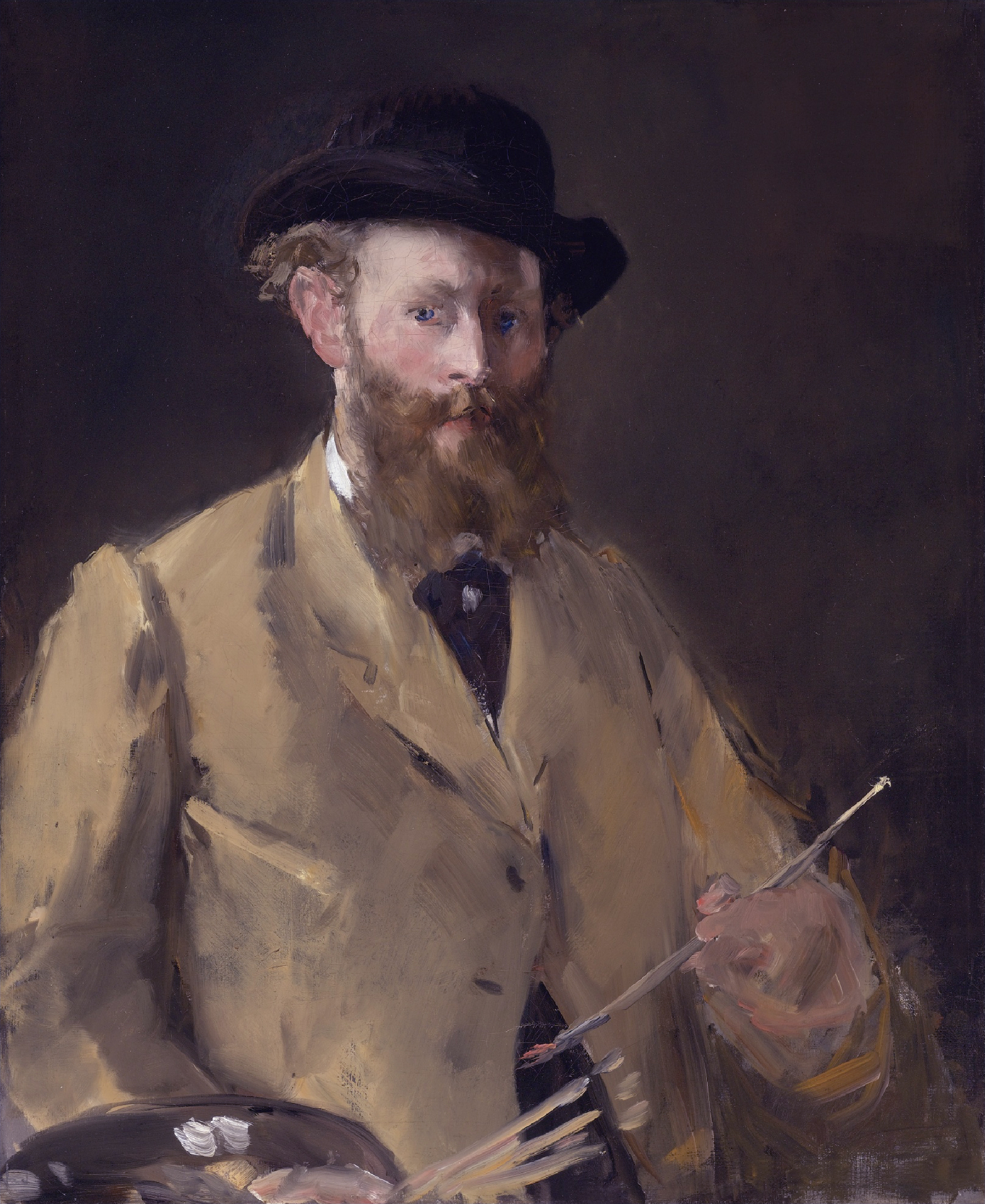
- Artist: Édouard Manet
- Year: 1878/1879
- Medium: Oil on canvas
- Dimensions: 83 cm × 67 cm (33 in × 26 in)
- Owner: Franck Giraud

Self-Portrait with Palette (French: Autoportrait à la palette) is an 1878–79 oil-on-canvas painting by the French artist Édouard Manet. This late impressionistic work is one of his two self-portraits. Velasquez's self-portrait in Las Meninas was a particular inspiration for Manet's painting which despite its allusion to the previous artist's work is very modern in its focus upon the personality of the artist and loose paint handling.

A long series of prominent collectors have owned this painting. Most recently, it sold for $29.48 million at Sotheby's on 22 June 2010.

== Description ==
The 83 × 67 cm (33 × 26 in) painting shows a half-length portrait of the painter Édouard Manet. In this self-portrait as painter he depicted himself as a stylish Boulevardier in front of a dark background. The depicted wears a black top hat and a brown jacket, under which is a white shirt, of which only the collar can be seen. The neckline of the suit jacket covers a black silk tie which is affixed by a tie pin. In the right, only vaguely depicted hand he holds a long wooden brush with red paint on the tip; the left hand holds a painting palette with about three more brushes. No further accessories are shown. The figure is lit from the left by which the shadows beneath the left arm and the right half of the face are created. His pose is slightly turned to the right, so that the right half of the body is darker than the forward, left half. The painter's gaze is directed forwards at the viewer.

== Origin and meaning ==
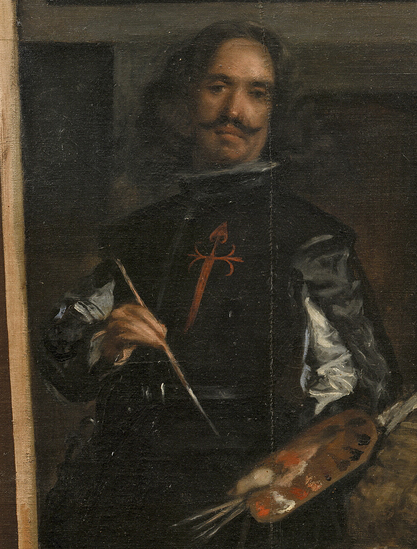
Self-portrait by Diego Velázquez – detail of Las Meninas, 1656

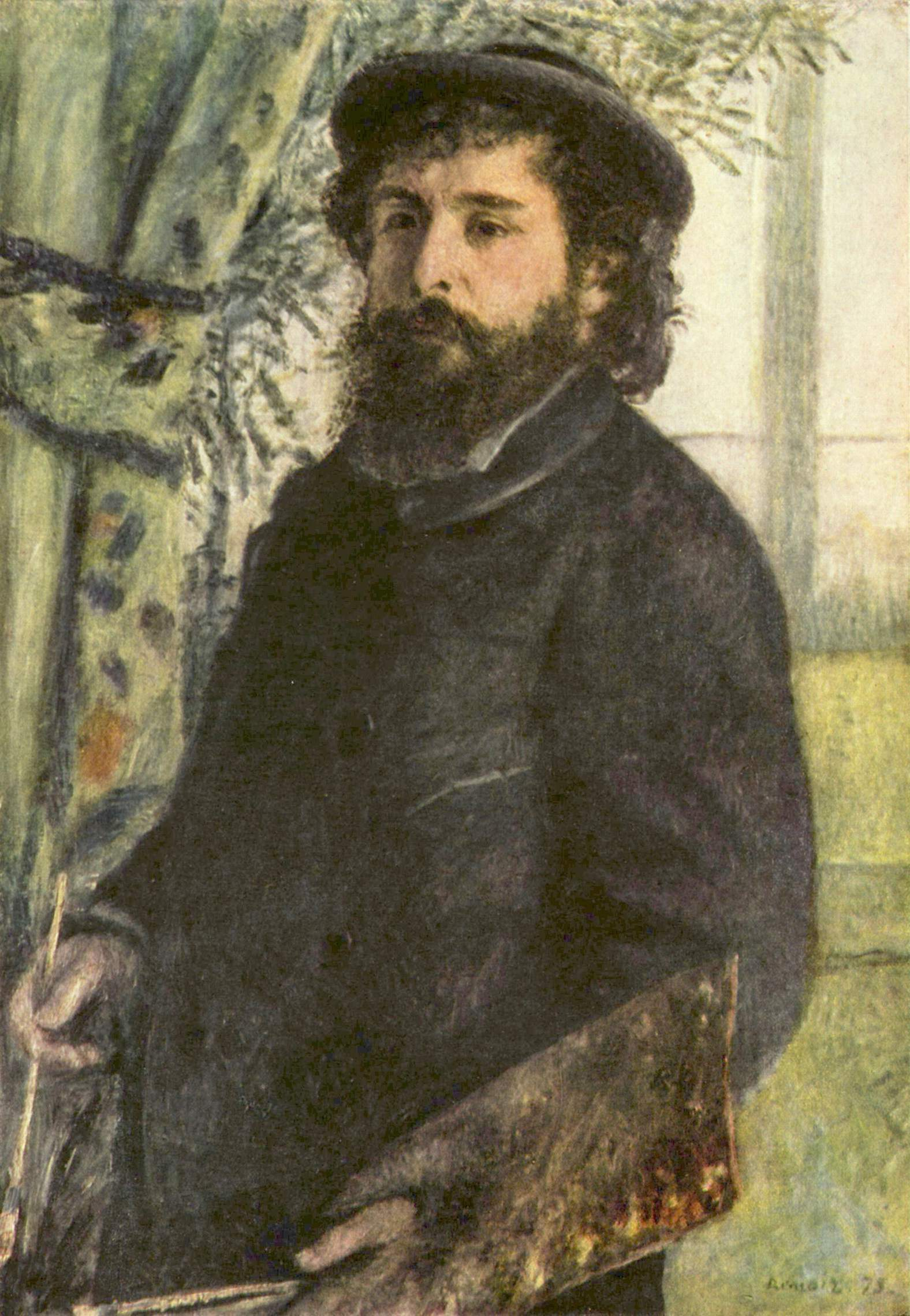
Pierre-Auguste Renoir, Portrait of the Painter Claude Monet, 1875

As has been established by X-ray analysis, Manet painted his Self-Portrait with Palette over a portrait in profile of his wife Suzanne Manet. In this picture she was depicted in a pose similar to that in the painting Madame Manet at the Piano (1868, Musée d'Orsay).

The dating of the painting goes back to Manet's friend Théodore Duret, who asked Léon Leenhof, the son of Manet's wife, about it after the painter's death. Moreover, Manet had used the same suit jacket that he wore in Self-Portrait with Palette in the painting At "Père Lathuille" (also from 1879), for the depiction of the son of the restaurant's owner.

Las Meninas, in which Diego Velázquez depicted himself in a similar pose with brush and palette, is considered an important precedent for the Self-Portrait with Palette. There the painter stands almost in the background of his studio, while his models, the five-year-old Margarita Teresa of Spain and her servants, occupy the foreground. From here Manet appropriated the pose of the painter and his equipment, but as opposed to Velázquez, he makes himself the thematic center of the image. At the same time, however, he is working on a painting, but leaves its subject matter, as well as his surroundings, to the imagination of the viewer. Manet himself between 1865 and 1870 portrayed Velázquez in a studio scene in which the Spanish painter is posed similarly to his self-portrait.

As a practical matter painters did not and do not wear formal dress while working, as it could far too easily be ruined by oil paint. Manet's depiction of himself as a painter in stylish city-going clothes has various precedents. Already Velázquez had shown himself in costly garb that would be appropriate for a courtier. In 1870 Manet had sat for the painter Henri Fantin-Latour in the painting Un atelier aux Batignolles while similarly well-dressed. His wearing of a hat indoors also has a direct precedent. Renoir had depicted Monet in 1875, with suit, hat and all. Just as Velázquez had used his clothes to underscore his proximity to the Spanish court, Manet's clothing shows his role as a stylish and successful Parisian artist, "who not only in his artistic posture, but also in his appearance is quintessentially the painter of modern life, of Baudelaire's description."

The unfinished right hand with the paintbrush is conspicuous in the painting. Victor Stoichiţă perceives this as Manet's intention and interprets it thusly: "because it is an act of painting that is depicted here, it turns painting around itself like a whirlwind" Françoise Cachin explains it as a way of concentrating the light and the attention of the viewer upon the more important aspects of the painting. Manet's wife Suzanne, however, described this painting and the Self-Portrait with Cap (1878–79) as sketches.

== Position in the Oeuvre ==
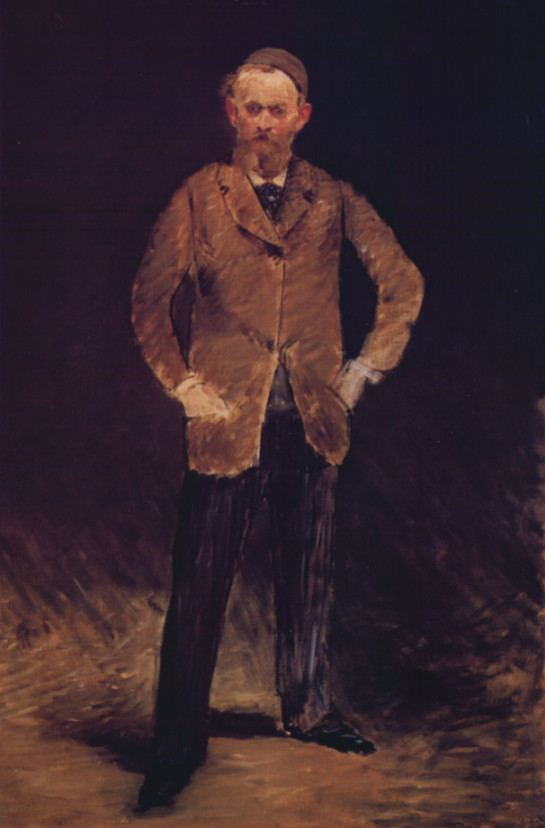
Self- Portrait with Cap (1878/79), Bridgestone Museum of Art, Tokyo

The Self-Portrait with Palette is the only self-portrait by Manet in which he depicted himself as an artist. He depicted himself in several other paintings, but almost always as one of many figures in a large composition. These works include Fishing (1860/61), Music in the Tuileries (1862), and The Ball of the Opera (1873).

The full-length Self-Portrait with Cap (1878–79) is the only other pure self-portrait by Manet. The chronological proximity of the two paintings implies a direct connection between them; accordingly, they have been considered as two stages of a work in progress. In the first painting, Self-Portrait with Palette, the act of painting itself is depicted by the blurred gestures of the painter. In the latter work, the painter is shown with the clear detachment of a viewer, rather than a creator. To Éric Darragon it appears that the painter has "stepped back, to evaluate his painting."

After Manet's death the two pictures hung on either side of the 1877 painting Jean-Baptiste Faure in the Role of Hamlet. From this arrangement Stoichiţă concludes that the choice of this Spanish influenced painting was meant to evoke a renewed parallel to Velázquez. Another message derived from the juxtaposition is that the self-portraits could almost be read as Manet in the Role of Manet. Juliet Wilson-Bareau, however, points out that Manet probably did not intend the pictures to be so displayed, as it was Léon Leenhoff who had the pictures framed and hung them on either side of the Faure portrait.

== Reception ==
The painting was often considered to be of lesser artistic value than Manet's other works. In 1926 the critic Étienne Moreau-Nélaton wrote: "This work, like the other efforts of the artist, are spoiled by a certain coldness. The artist's hand moves with too much fire, painting so freely here, that it is impossible for the painter to seriously focus upon himself as an object." On the other hand, Theodore Reff in 1982 emphasized the meaning of Manet's decision to approach self-portraiture, which he had never before attempted, at the high point of his career. The chosen clothes, in both case stylish suits, give the impression that Manet considered himself not only a successful artist but a successful figure in society: the paintings are a record of this success.

Wilson-Bareau proposes an alternate explanation for the origin of the self-portraits. When the art historian and Manet biographer Adolphe Tabarant asked Manet's stepson Léon Leenhoff about the point in time at which Manet had been stricken with Syphilis, Leenhoff gave 1879 as an answer, which would explain why Manet, who had never before in his life painted a self-portrait, had painted two within that year. It would seem that with the reality of death right before his eyes, he felt a need to come to terms with himself.

The nephew of the artist, Edouard Vibert (1867–1899) finished shortly before his death a series of copies of various Manet paintings for Madame Manet as mementos of the paintings that had had to be sold after the death of the artist. Around the turn of the 20th century a copy of the Self-Portrait with Palette was attested that was ascribed to Vibert.

== Provenance ==
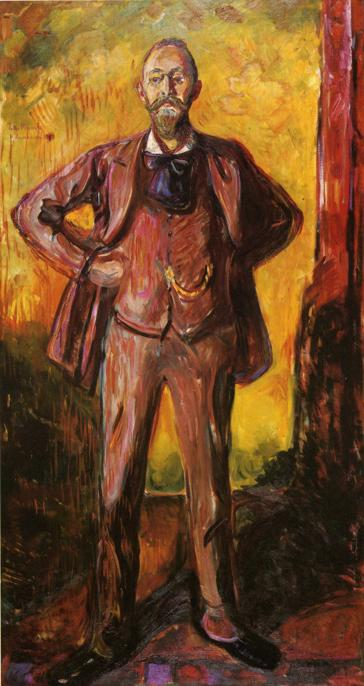
Edvard Munch (1909), Professor Daniel Jacobson, oil on canvas. 204 × 111.5 cm. Munch Museum, Oslo, Norway

The Self-Portrait with Palette was not sold during Manet's lifetime and after his death was held by his widow. Nor were either of the self-portraits sold in the 1884 estate sale. Manet's widow does not appear to have wanted to sell them until 1897, as Antonin Proust in a letter from May 10 of that year stated that neither Jean-Baptiste Faure nor Auguste Pellerin were interested in the paintings.

On 2 February 1899, Suzanne Manet bequeathed the pictures to her sister Martina Leenhoff, probably with the intention of aiding her during financial difficulties. That year, Madame Manet and Proust renewed their efforts to sell the paintings. This time the art dealers Hermann Paechter and Ambroise Vollard expressed interest. Later that year Paechter obtained the paintings at the price of 6,000 Francs for the Self-Portrait with Cap and only 1,000 for Self-Portrait with Palette. In Théodore Duret's 1902 exhibit catalog the picture is listed as the property of Pellerin.

Shortly after, the Self-Portrait with Cap went to the collection of Max Linde in Lübeck. In addition to being an art collector Linde was also an ophthalmologist, with Edvard Munch among his patients. Eventually the Norwegian artist was inspired by the Manet to paint various other full length portraits, including a 1909 portrait of his psychiatrist Daniel Jacobson, which came close to the Manet in style and feeling.

In May 1910, the Self-Portrait with Palette appeared in an exhibit at the gallery of Georges Petit in Paris, where it was labeled as on loan from the widow of the Marquis Etienne de Ganay. Just a month later it was shown in an exhibit by the gallery owners Paul Durand-Ruel, Bernheim-Jeune and Paul Cassirer together with all other Manet paintings that had previously been owned by Pellerin. Pellerin had sold his collection to the dealers, with the exception of the Self-Portrait with Palette, which he had sold to Madame de Ganay immediately beforehand. Ganay owned the painting through the 1920s; by 1931 it was in the collection of the Berlin bank president Jakob Goldschmidt. Goldschmidt immigrated to New York City in 1936, taking his collection with him, and died there in 1955. In 1958 the painting was bought by J. Summers for 65,000.

Later the collector couple John and Frances L. Loeb from New York acquired the painting for $176,800. At the auction of the Loeb collection on 12 May 1997 the painting was sold for $18.7 million to an anonymous bidder. At that time it was the second highest price ever paid for a work by Manet. Shortly thereafter the new owner was revealed to be the Casino developer Steve Wynn, as he displayed the picture in his hotel in the Hotel Bellagio and Wynn Las Vegas. In March 2005, it was privately sold to Steven A. Cohen. The price is estimated to have been between $35 million to $40 million.

On 7 May 2010, it was announced that Cohen had decided to auction the painting at Sotheby's on 22 June 2010. The price was expected to be between $30.1 and $45.2 million. These expectations were not met, however, and the painting sold for £22,441,250 ($29.48 million) to the New York collector Franck Giraud. The price was nevertheless a record for a Manet painting.

== Gallery ==
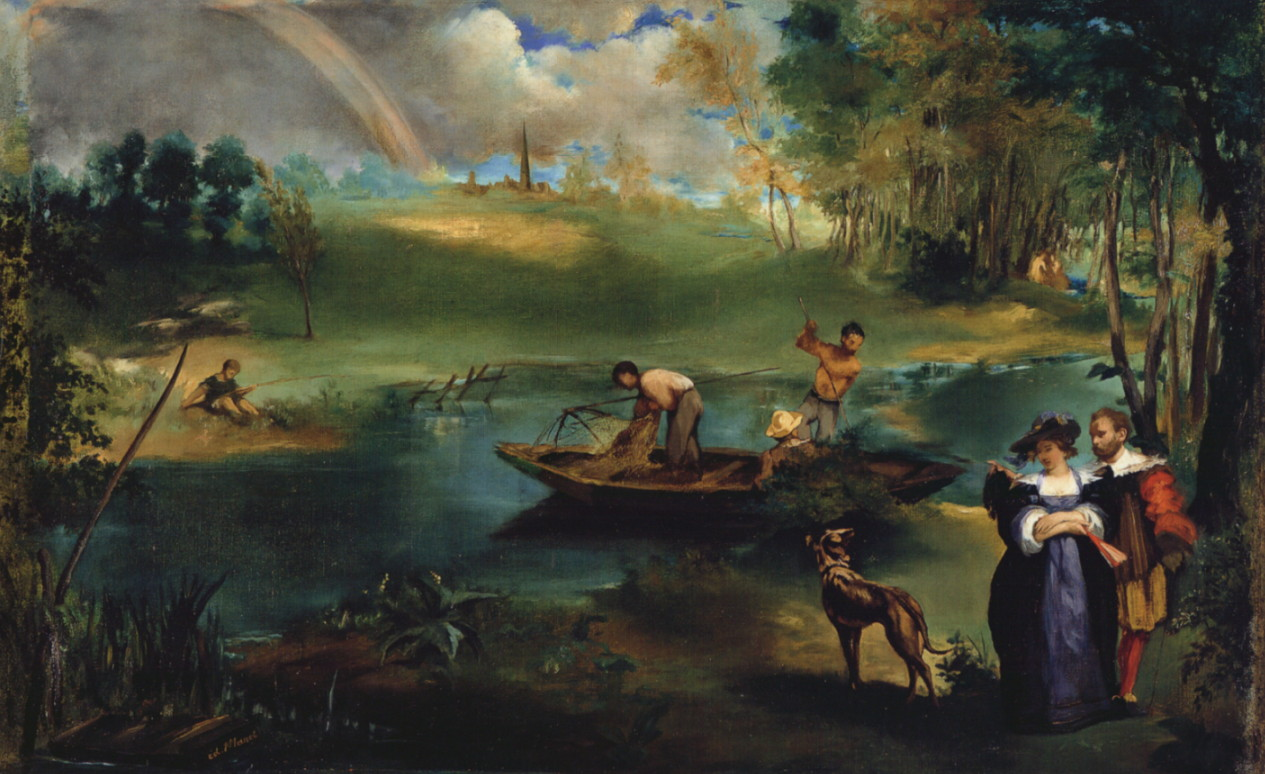
Fishing, 1860/61

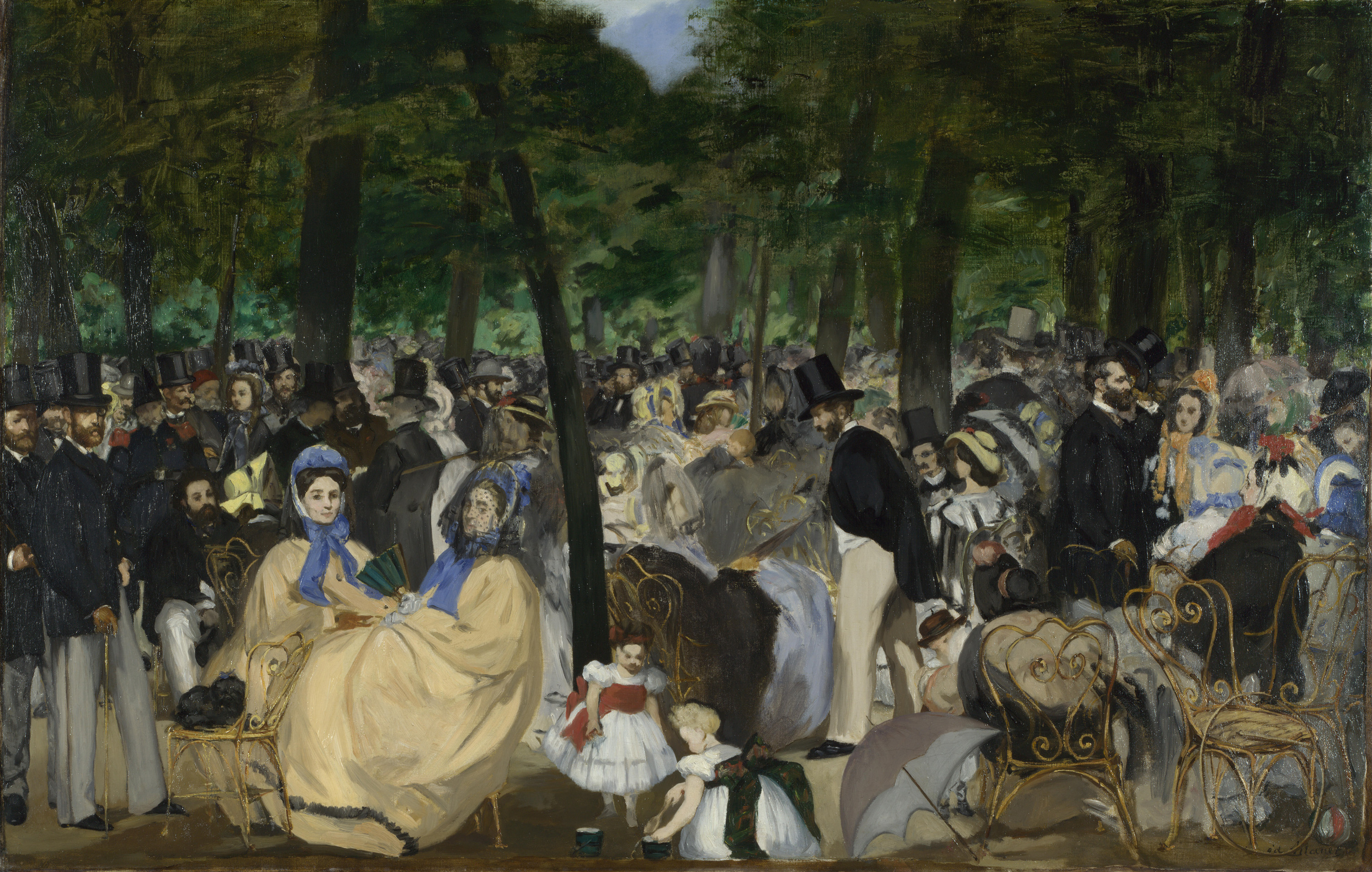
Music in the Tuileries, 1862

The Ball of the Opera, 1873

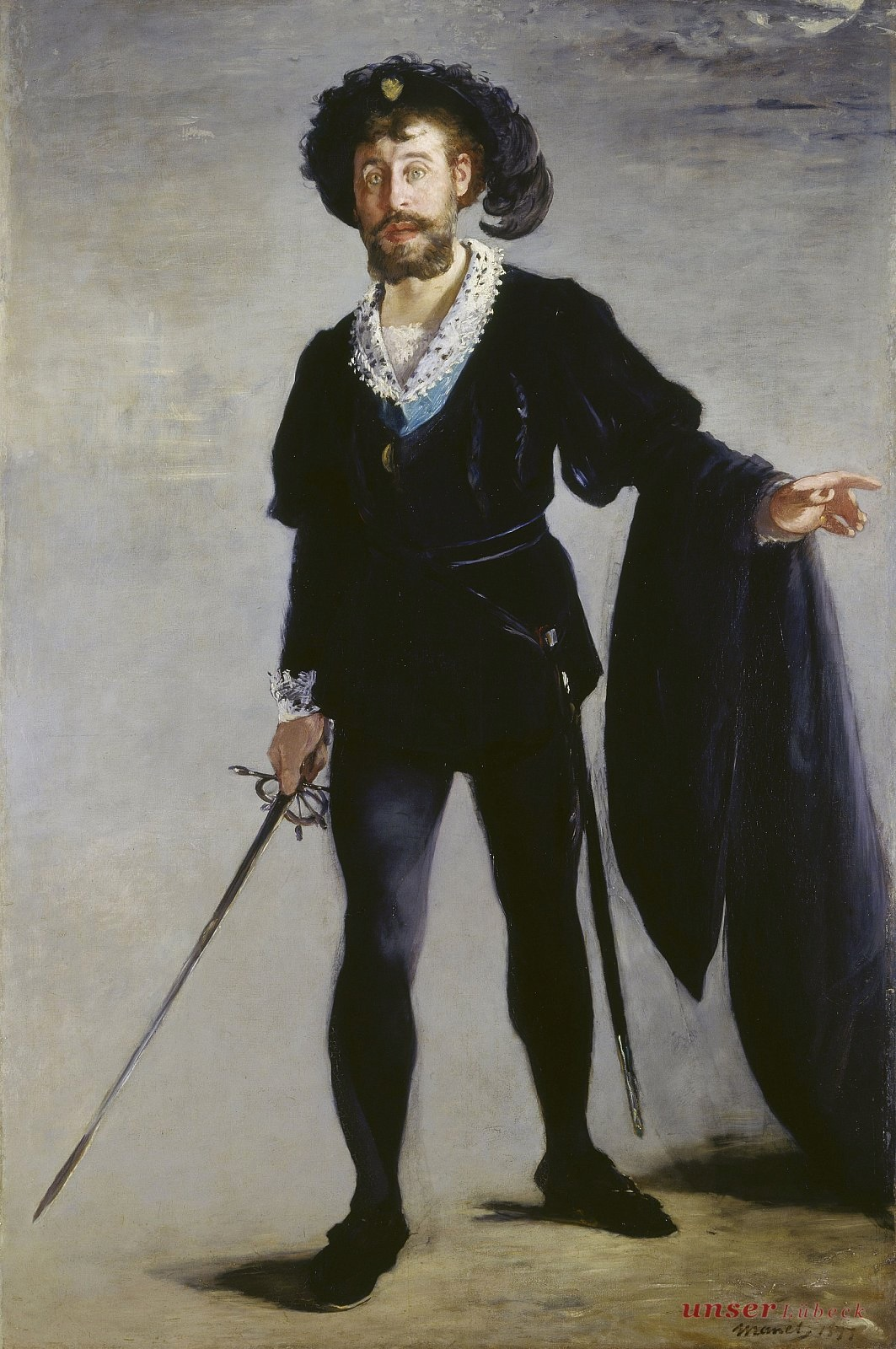
Jean-Baptiste Faure in the Role of Hamlet, 1877

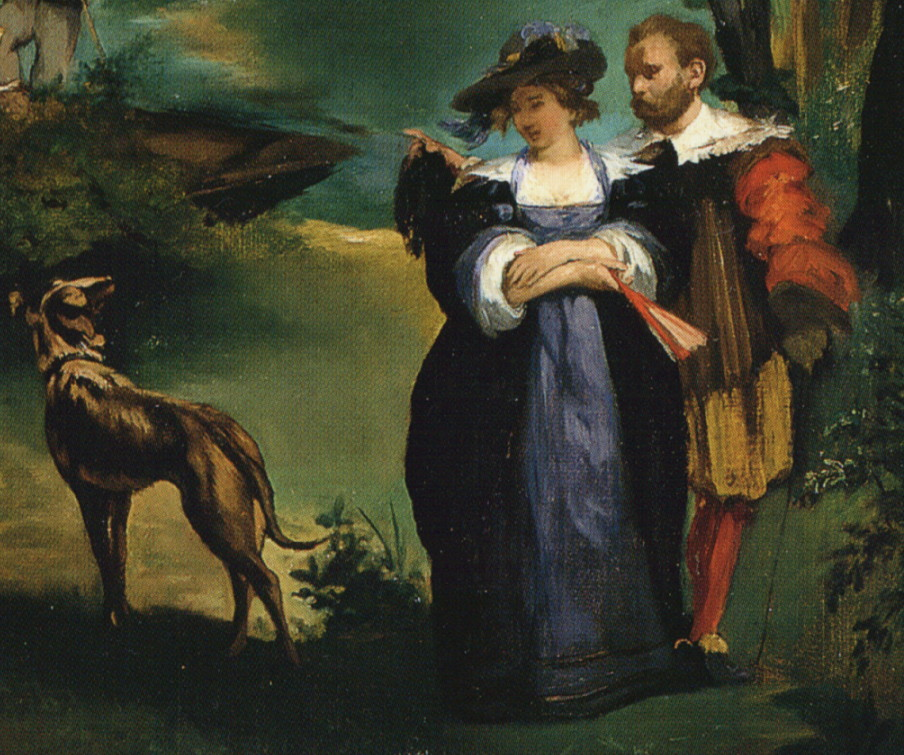
Fishing (Detail), Manet together with later wife Suzanne

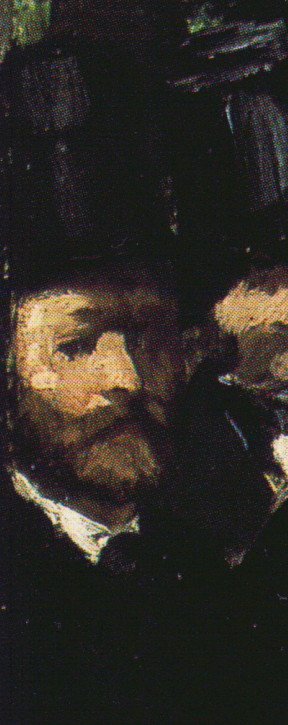
Music in the Tuileries (Detail)

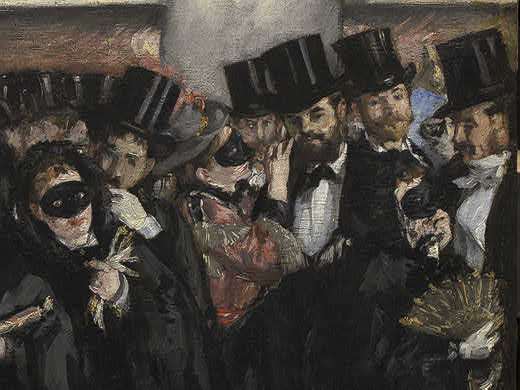
The Ball of the Opera (Detail), Manet is the man with the blond beard

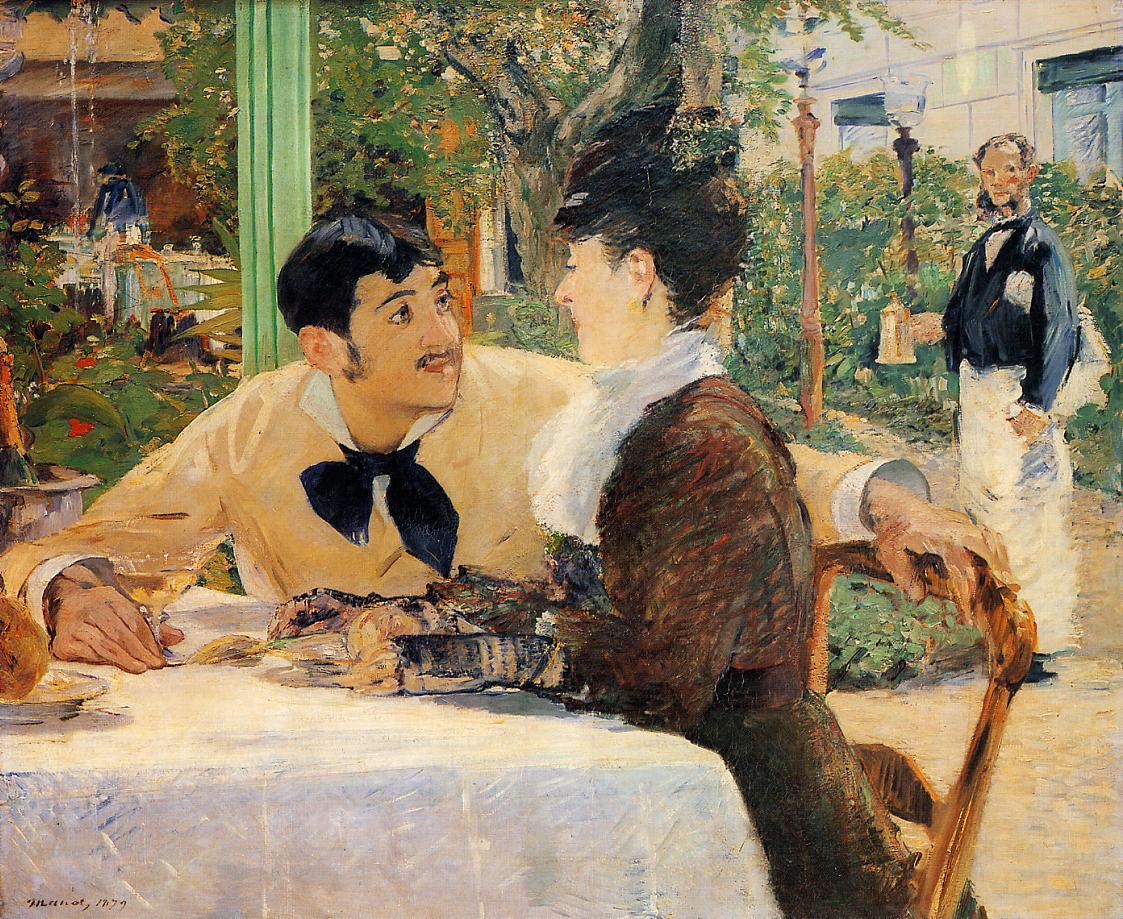
At Pere Lathuille, 1879, uses the same suit jacket

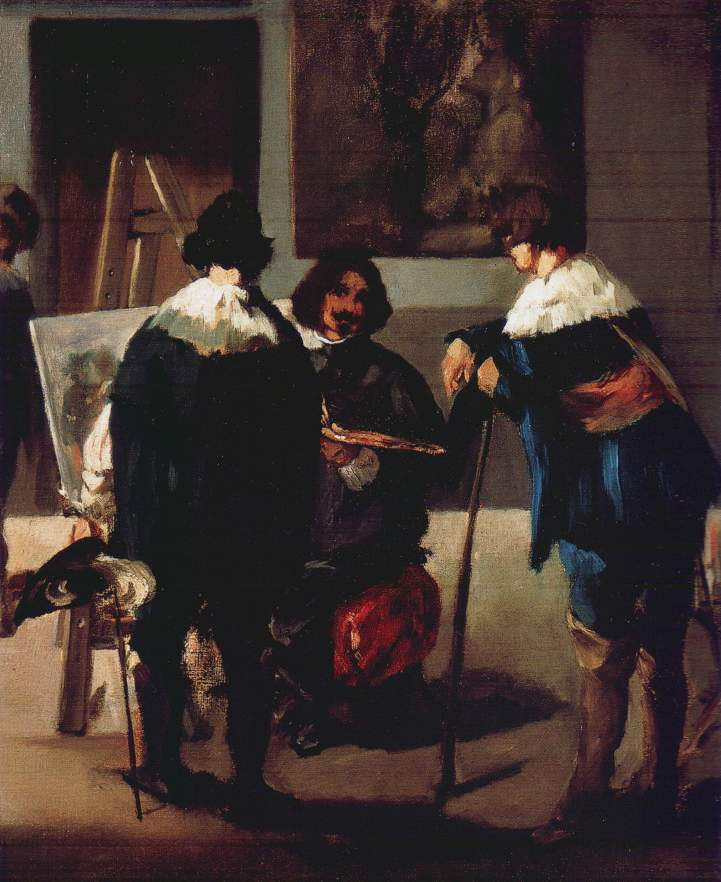
Édouard Manet: Velasquez in his Studio, 1865–1870

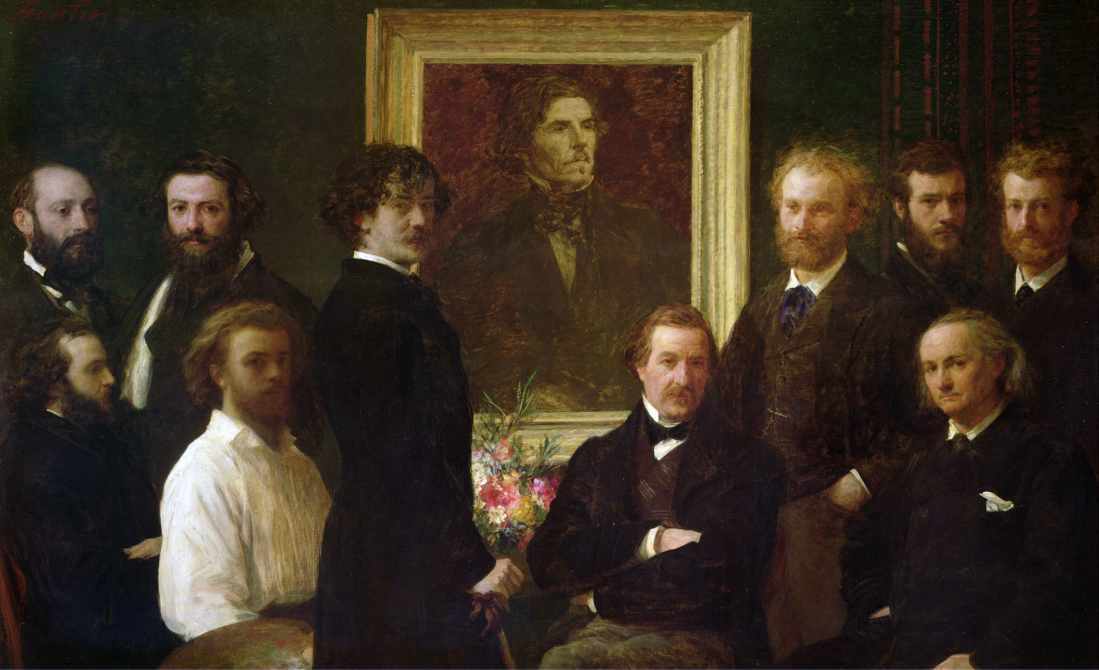
Henri Fantin-Latour: Hommage à Delacroix, 1864

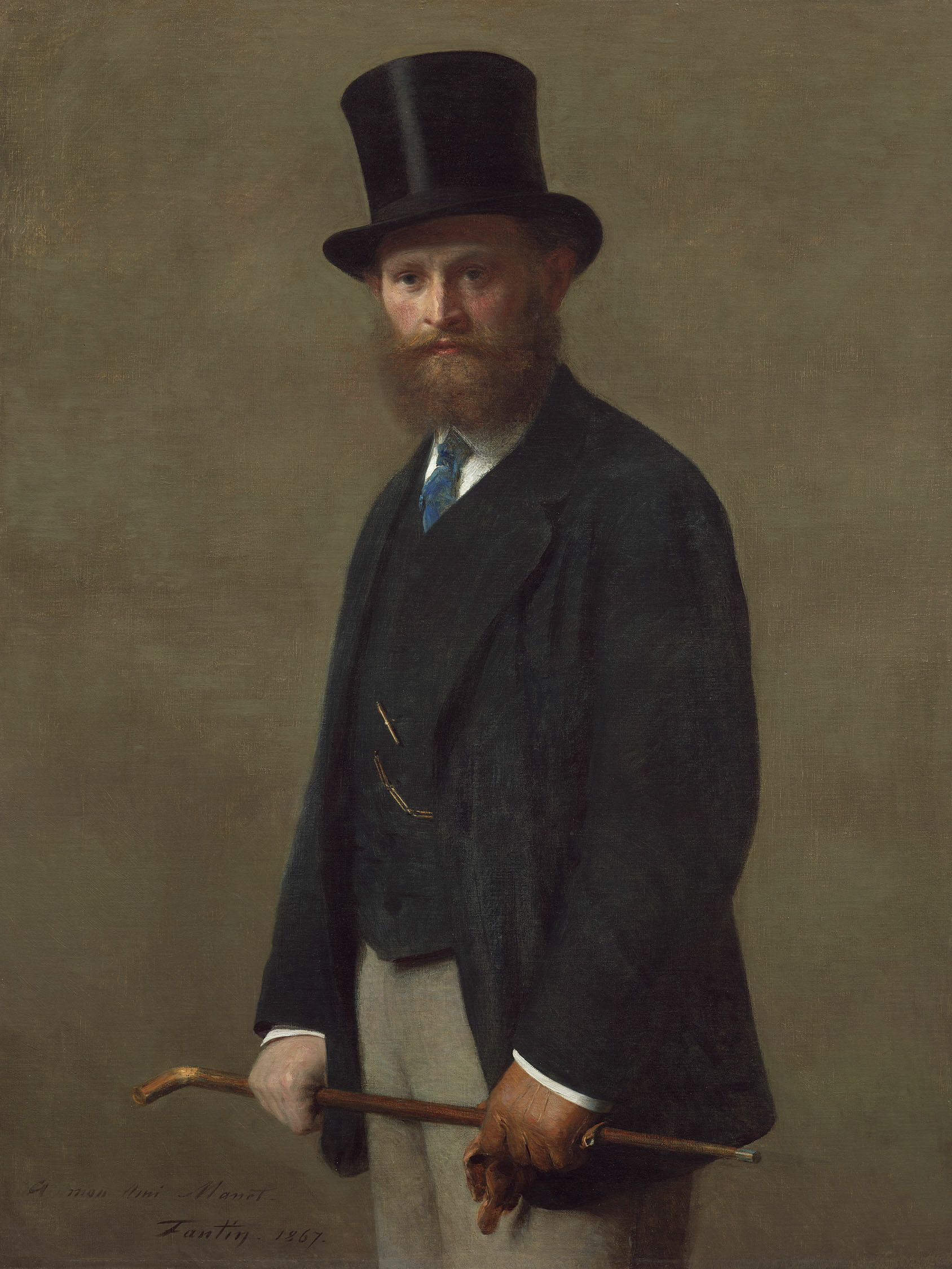
Henri Fantin-Latour: Portrait d'Édouard Manet, 1867

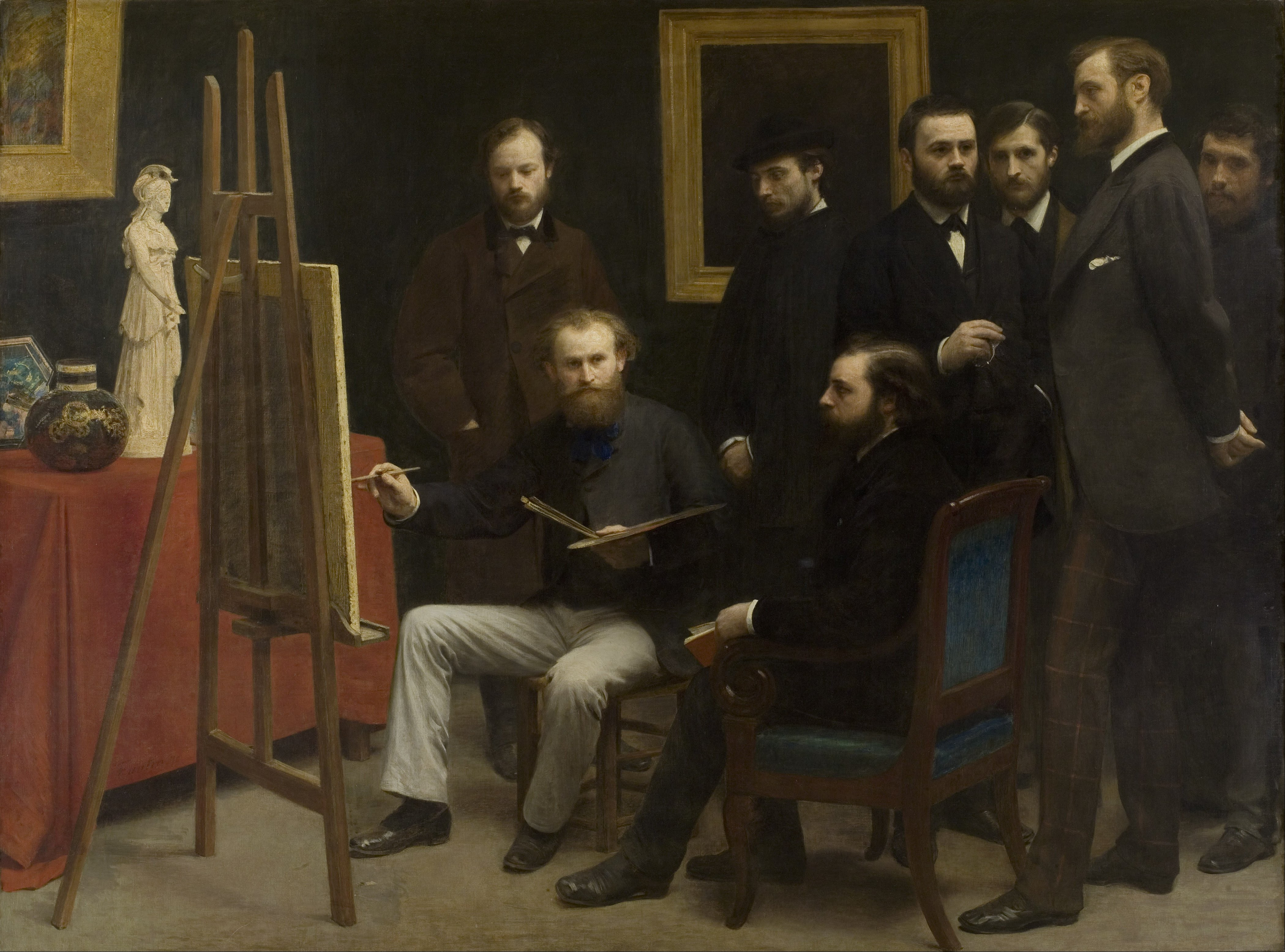
Henri Fantin-Latour: Un atelier aux Batignolles, 1870

== See also ==
- Self-portraiture
- List of paintings by Édouard Manet
