= The Dance Lesson =

1879 painting by Edgar Degas

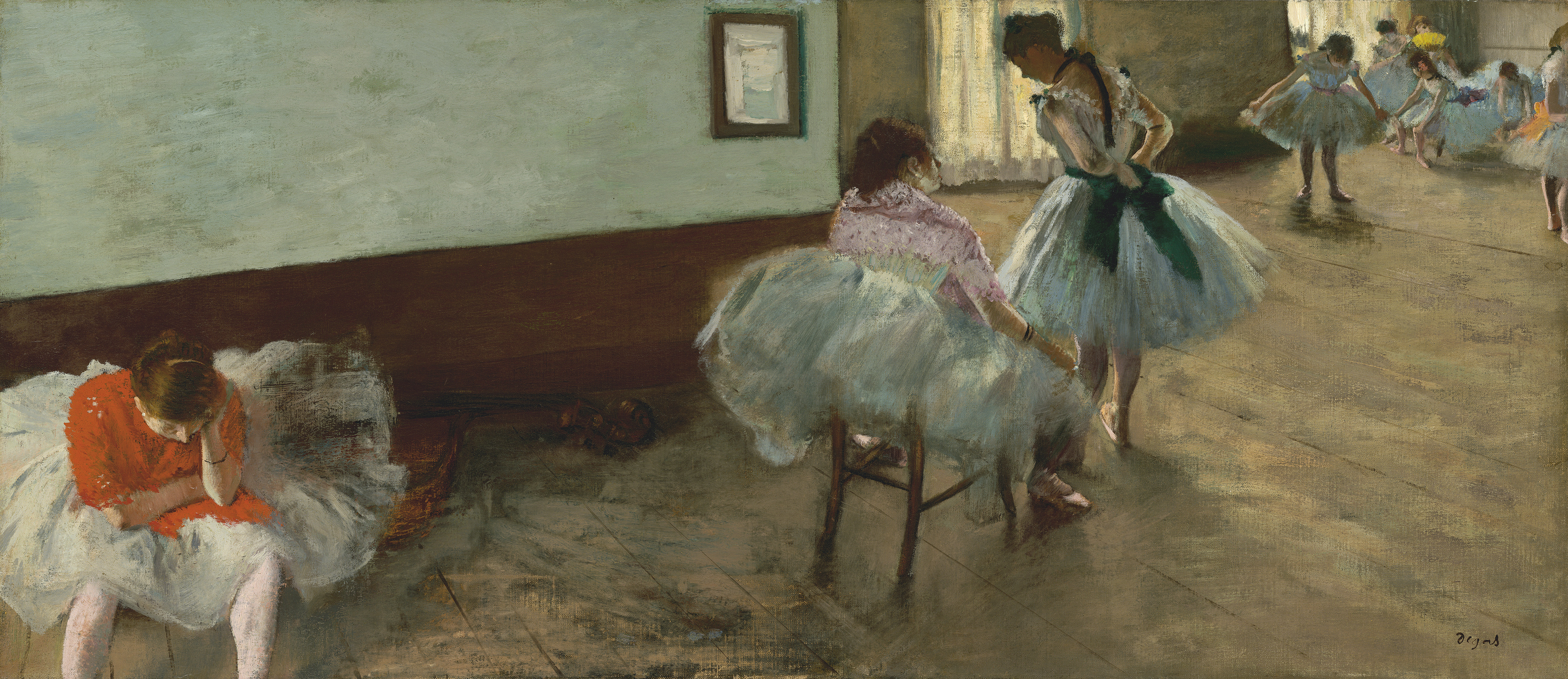
- The Dance Lesson by Edgar Degas
- Artist: Edgar Degas
- Year: 1879
- Medium: oil-on-canvas painting
- Dimensions: 38 cm × 88 cm (15 in × 35 in)
- Location: National Gallery of Art, Washington, D.C.

The Dance Lesson (sometimes known as The Dancing Lesson) is an oil on canvas painting by the French artist Edgar Degas created c. 1879. It is held at the National Gallery of Art in Washington, D.C. There is at least one other work by Degas by this title, also made in about 1879, which is a pastel.

== Description ==
The painting is the first of a series of about 40 pictures that Degas painted in this horizontal, frieze-like format. It measures 38 by 88 centimetres (15 in × 35 in).

To the far left is a double bass with an exhausted dancer wearing a bright orange shawl sitting on it. There was also an open violin-case, which although painted out, is still visible. In the centre of the painting is a dancer in a pink shawl sitting on a chair with another dancer, turned away, standing just behind her adjusting the dark coloured sash of her dress. To the far right, at the back of the room, is a group of dancers practising their moves in the light from a large window.

The painting was carefully composed and shows the inspiration Degas drew from Japanese prints, with figures deliberately placed off-centre or cut off at unexpected angles and the large expanse of floor which appears to tilt upwards.

== Location and provenance ==
The painting The Dance Lesson is currently kept at the National Gallery of Art in Washington, D.C. Prior to its donation in 1995, the painting was part of the collection of Paul Mellon, who purchased it in 1957. Prior to this it had been loaned to the Boston Museum of Fine Arts in the 1920s and was loaned to a 1937 Degas exhibition in Paris by its then owner, Mrs Fiske Howard.

== Relation to other paintings ==
The Metropolitan Museum of Art owns a painting titled Dancers in the Rehearsal Room with a Double Bass, dated 1882–85, which is possibly the second painting in the sequence. Another painting from the sequence, Before the Ballet (1890/1892), is also in the National Gallery of Art., and Ballet Rehearsal (La salle de danse, c.1885) is in the Yale University Art Gallery. When placed side by side in a frieze format, the paintings take on a decorative aspect although were not originally intended to be hung this way. It has been suggested that the 40-odd paintings collectively show how Degas examined his theory that the "intervals between figures and space were the basis for creating ornament".

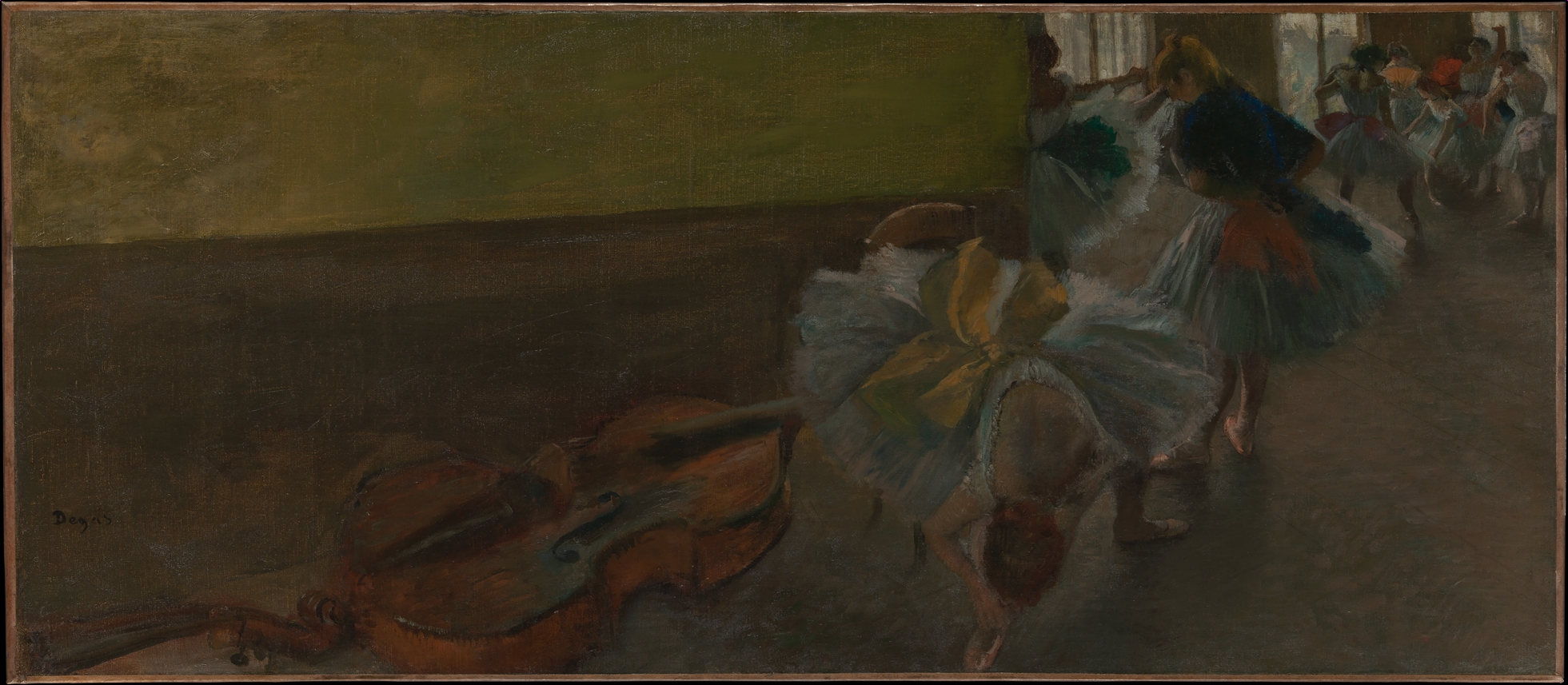
Dancers in the Rehearsal Room with a Double Bass, 1882–85, Metropolitan Museum of Art

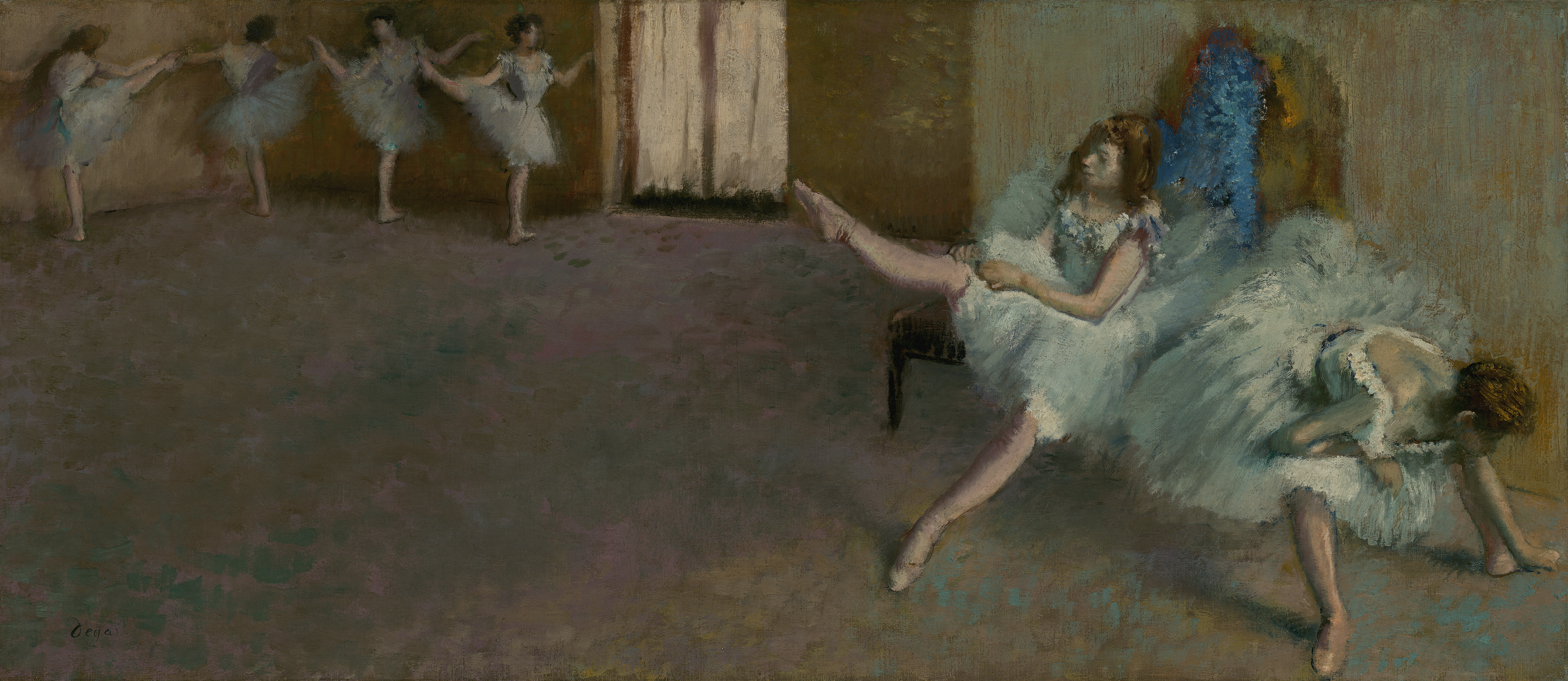
Before the Ballet (1890/1892), National Gallery of Art

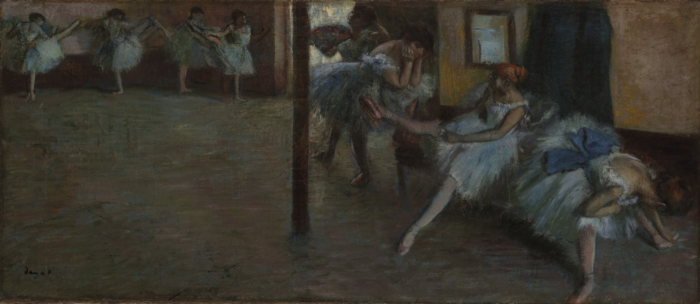
Ballet Rehearsal (La salle de danse, c.1885), Yale University Art Gallery
