= Jockeys Before the Race =

Painting by Edgar Degas

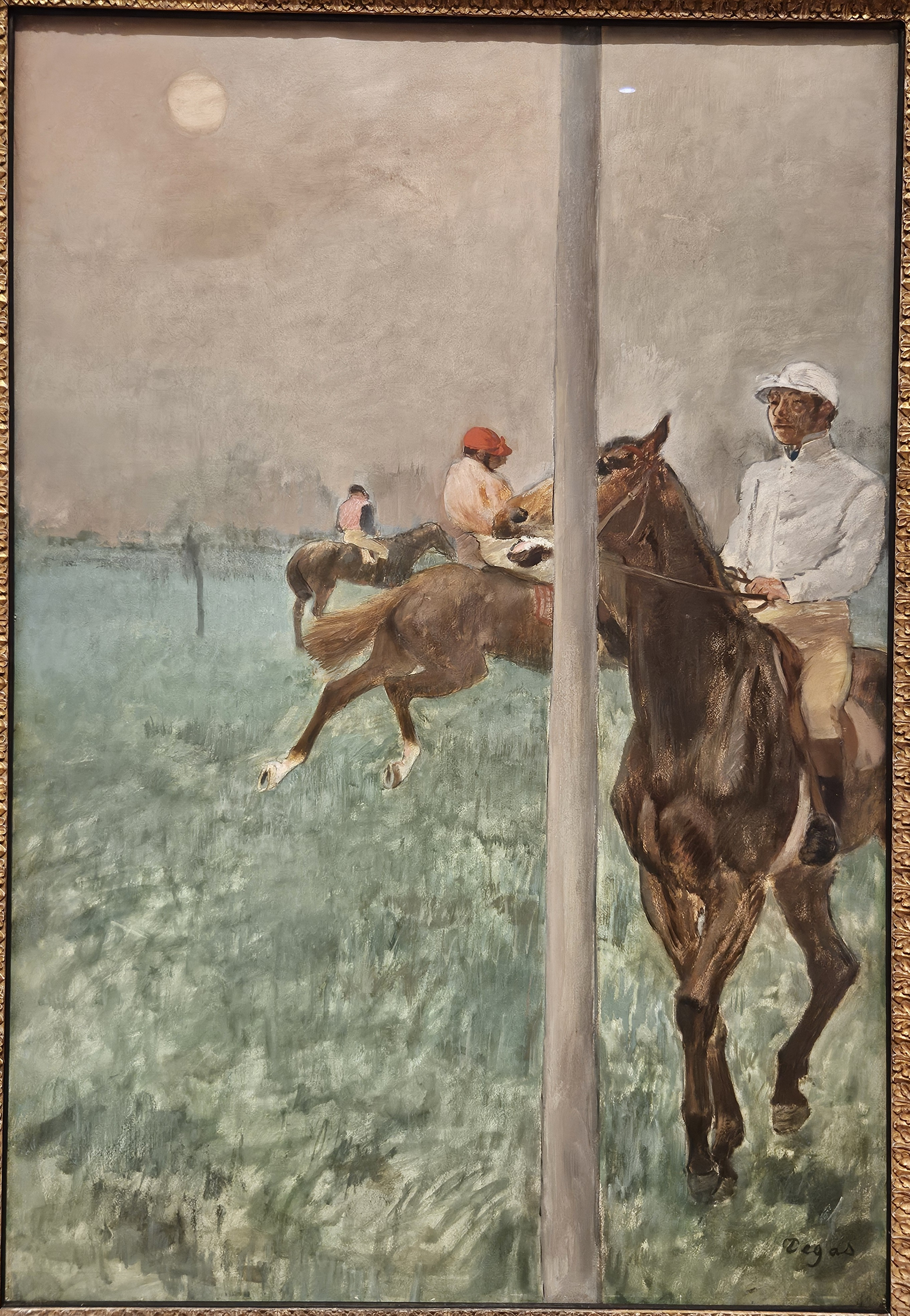
- Artist: Edgar Degas
- Year: 1879
- Type: Oil on canvas, portrait painting
- Dimensions: 107.3 cm × 73.7 cm (42.2 in × 29.0 in)
- Location: Barber Institute of Fine Arts, Birmingham

Jockeys Before the Race is an oil on canvas genre painting by the French artist Edgar Degas, from 1879. It shows the moment before the start of a race as the racehorses and jockeys mill about. The starting post bisects the composition reflecting the interest of Degas in Japanese art, which had a major influence of European painting and design in the aftermath of the Perry Expedition.

The picture is notable for its use of mixed media with Degas combining oil, pastel and other elements. It was displayed at the Fourth Impressionist exhibition held in Paris in 1879. Today the painting is in the collection of the Barber Institute of Fine Arts in Birmingham, which purchased it in 1950.

== Bibliography ==
- Boggs, Jean Sutherland. Degas. Metropolitan Museum of Art, 1988.
- Sutton, Denys. Edgar Degas. Rizzoli, 1986.
