= Portraits at the Stock Exchange =

Painting by Edgar Degas

At the Stock Exchange
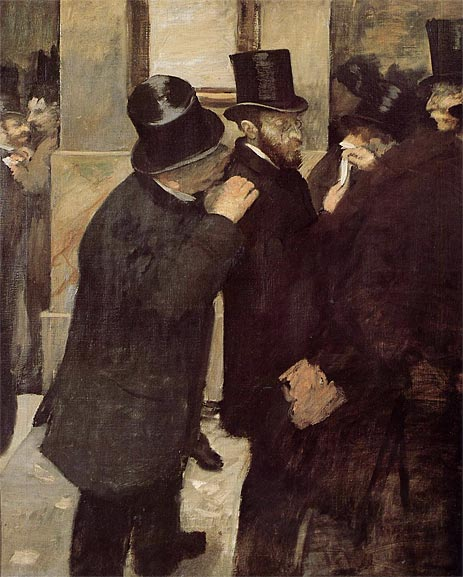
- Artist: Edgar Degas
- Year: c. 1879
- Medium: oil on canvas
- Dimensions: 100 cm × 82 cm (39 in × 32 in)
- Location: Musée d'Orsay, Paris

Portraits at the Stock Exchange (also known as At the Bourse) is a painting by the French artist Edgar Degas. Completed in about 1879, the painting was already in the collection of the French banker Ernest May when it was listed in the catalogue of the fourth Impressionist exhibition that year. It may also have been shown in the next Impressionist exhibit in 1880, but it was not well known until it entered the collections of the Louvre in 1923. The canvas shows an interior corner of the open trading floor of the Paris Stock Exchange (The Paris Bourse). May stands in the center of the picture wearing a top hat and pince-nez, listening to his colleague, a certain M. Bolâtre, leaning over his shoulder. They are likely discussing a document, possibly a bordereau, held aloft by a partially obscured third party.

Although the owner and possible commissioner of the work was himself Jewish, art historian Linda Nochlin has interpreted the painting as an antisemitic depiction of Jews in Paris, due especially to the exaggerated features and postures of the subjects. British art historian Richard Shone has written about the oil painting and its pastel study without mentioning anti-Semitism. In stark contrast to Nochlin, he describes the figures as having "humdrum features." May himself, according to Shone, is depicted as a "seasoned figure" whose "expression gives nothing away." While antisemitism has a long history in France, there is little evidence of Degas holding this attitude until the time of the Dreyfus affair two decades later.

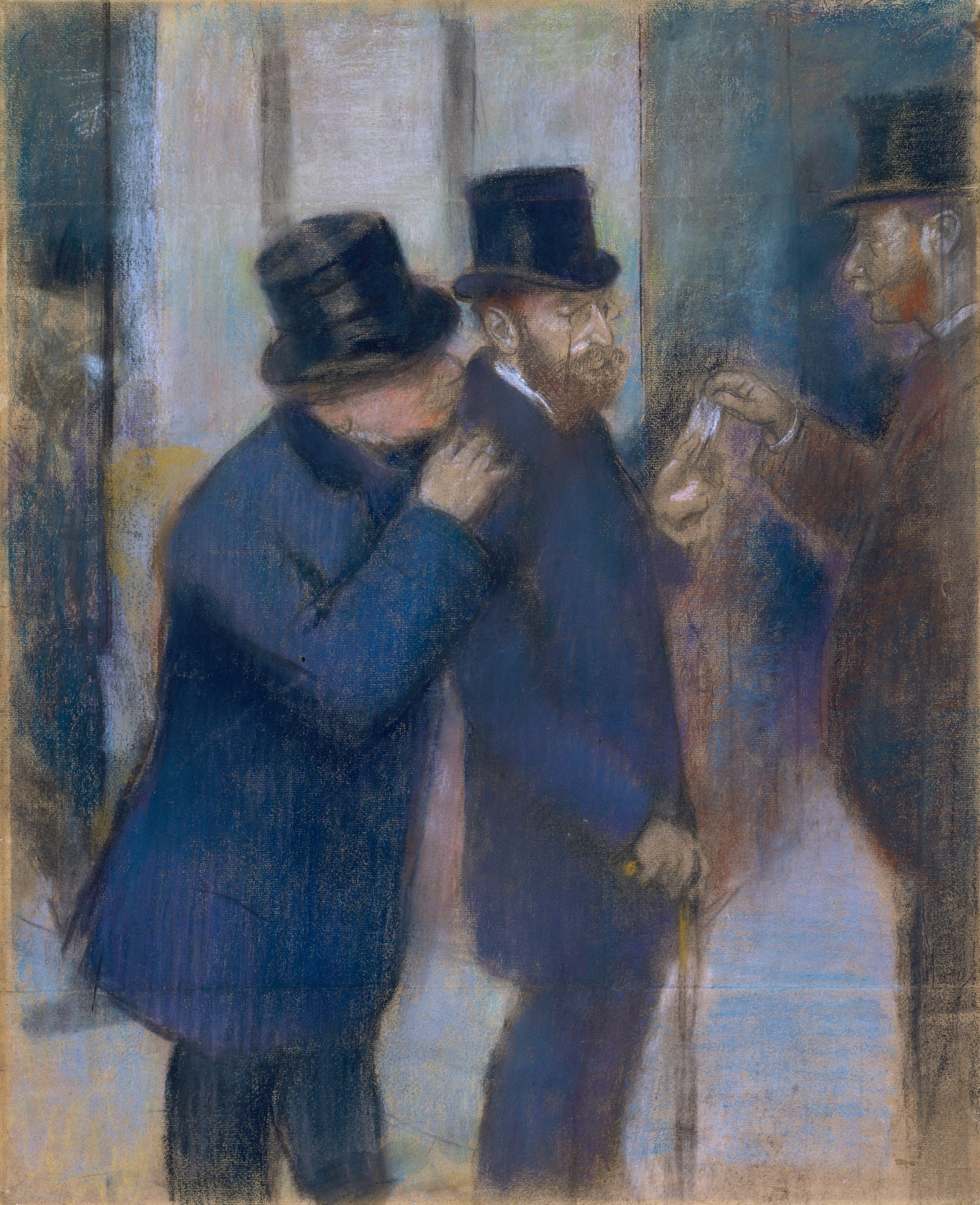
Pastel sketch for the oil painting

The technique of Portraits at the Stock Exchange can be more closely related to Impressionism than many of Degas's earlier works. Evidence for this can be found in the painting's quickly applied, sketchy brushstrokes. The psychological perspective of the painting is one of detachment, a common viewpoint in Impressionist paintings. This painting is currently at the Musée d'Orsay in Paris. A smaller, pastel sketch of the same subject can be found in the Metropolitan Museum of Art.
