= Berthe Morisot =

French artist (1841–1895)

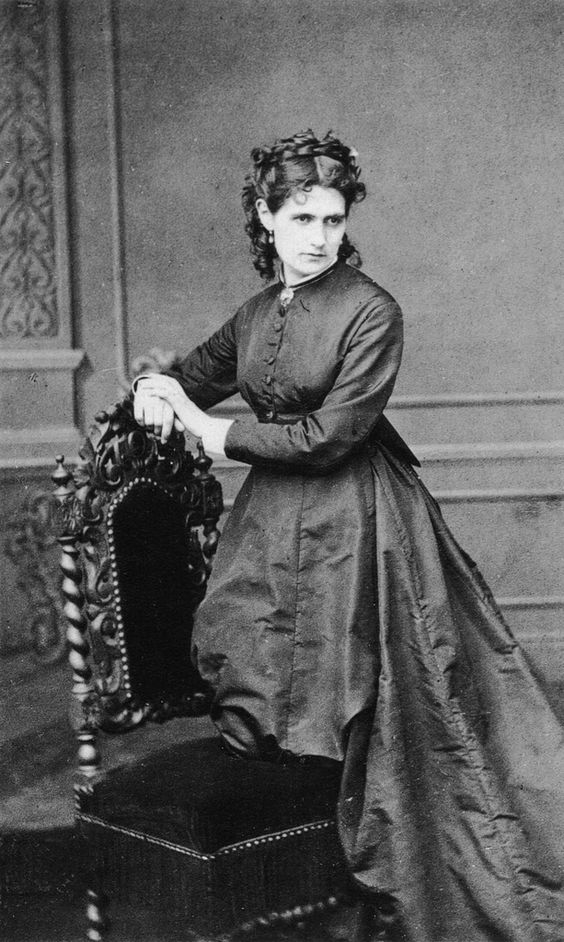
- Berthe Morisot
- Born: Berthe Marie Pauline Morisot; 14 January 1841; Bourges, Cher, France
- Died: 2 March 1895 (aged 54); Paris, France
- Resting place: Cimetière de Passy
- Known for: Painting
- Movement: Impressionism
- Spouse: Eugène Manet (m. 1874; died 1892)
- Children: Julie Manet

Signature
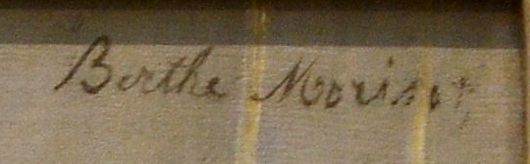

Berthe Marie Pauline Morisot (English: /mɒriːˈzoʊ/ mor-ee-ZOH, French: [bɛʁt mɔʁizo]; 14 January 1841 – 2 March 1895) was a French painter, printmaker and a member of the circle of painters in Paris who became known as the Impressionists.

In 1864, Morisot exhibited for the first time in the highly esteemed Paris Salon, listed as a student of Joseph Guichard and Achille-Francois Oudinot. Her work was selected for exhibition in six subsequent Salons until, in 1874, she joined the "rejected" Impressionists in the first of their own exhibitions (15 April – 15 May 1874), which included Paul Cézanne, Edgar Degas, Claude Monet, Camille Pissarro, Pierre-Auguste Renoir, and Alfred Sisley. It was held at the studio of the photographer Nadar. Morisot went on to participate in all but one of the following eight impressionist exhibitions, between 1874 and 1886.

Morisot was married to Eugène Manet, the brother of her friend and colleague Édouard Manet.

She was described by art critic Gustave Geffroy in 1894 as one of Les trois grandes dames, 'The three great ladies', of Impressionism alongside Marie Bracquemond and Mary Cassatt.

== Early life ==
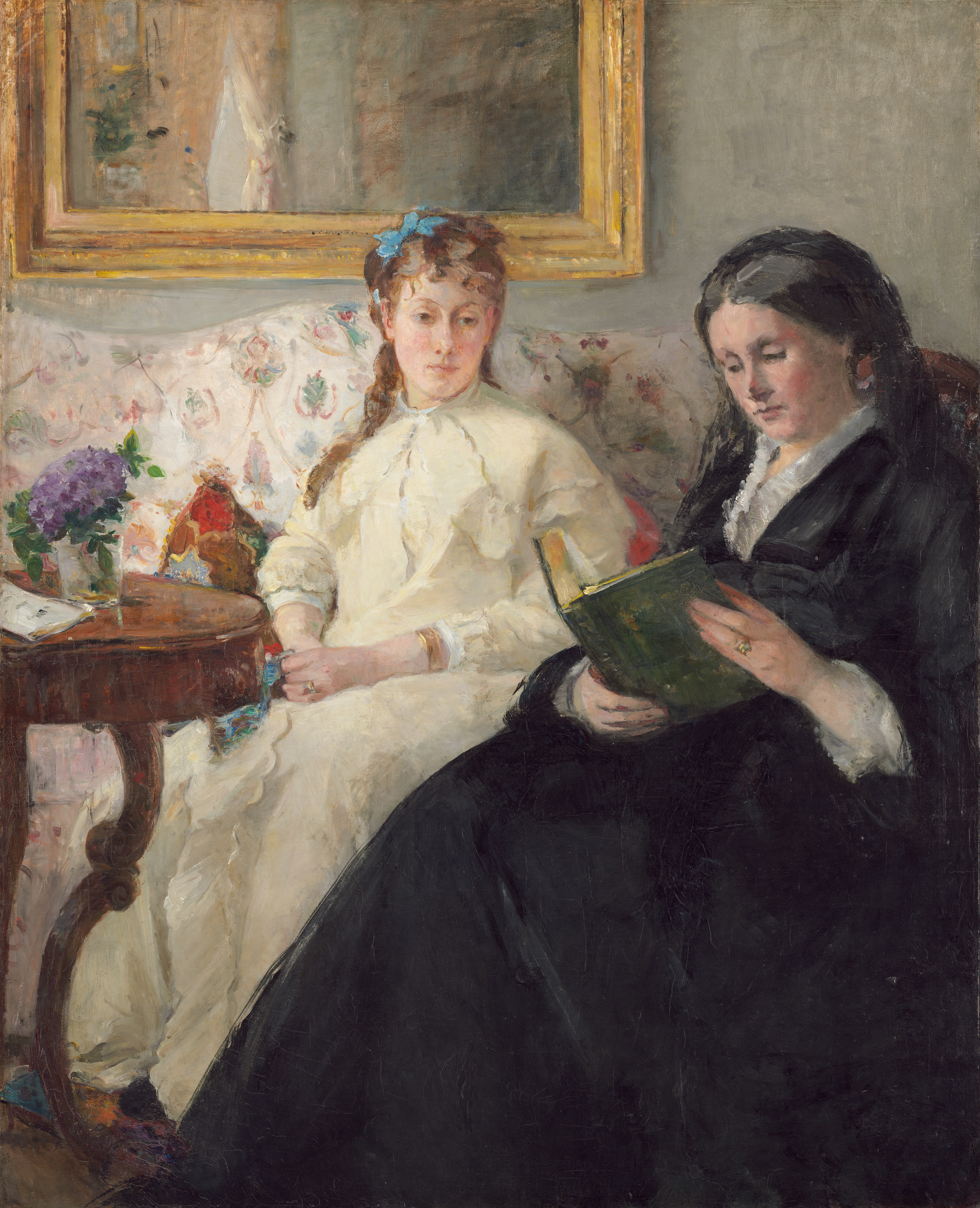
The Mother and Sister of the Artist (1869/70). Depicting Marie-Joséphine and Edma.

Morisot was born on 14 January 1841, in Bourges, France, into an affluent bourgeois family. Her father, Edmé Tiburce Morisot, was the prefect (senior administrator) of the department of Cher. He also studied architecture at École des Beaux-Arts. Her mother, Marie-Joséphine-Cornélie Thomas, was the great-niece of Jean-Honoré Fragonard, one of the most prolific Rococo painters of the ancien régime. She had two older sisters, Yves (1838–1893) and Edma (1839–1921), plus a younger brother, Tiburce, born in 1848. The family moved to Paris in 1852, when Morisot was a child.

It was commonplace for daughters of bourgeois families to receive art education, so Berthe and her sisters, Yves and Edma, were taught privately by Geoffroy-Alphonse Chocarne and Joseph Guichard. Morisot and her sisters initially started taking lessons so that they could each make a drawing for their father for his birthday. In 1857 Guichard, who ran a school for girls in Rue des Moulins, introduced Berthe and Edma to the Louvre gallery where from 1858 they learned by copying paintings. The Morisots were not only forbidden to work at the museum unchaperoned, but they were also totally barred from formal training. Guichard also introduced them to the works of Gavarni.

As art students, Berthe and Edma worked closely together until 1869, when Edma married Adolphe Pontillon, a naval officer, moved to Cherbourg, and had less time to paint. Letters between the sisters show a loving relationship, underscored by Berthe's regret at the distance between them, and Edma's withdrawal from painting. Edma wholeheartedly supported Berthe's continued work and their families always remained close. Edma wrote "I am often with you in thought, dear Berthe. I'm in your studio and I like to slip away, if only for a quarter of an hour, to breathe that atmosphere that we shared for many years".

Her sister Yves married Théodore Gobillard, a tax inspector, in 1866 and was painted by Edgar Degas as Madame Théodore Gobillard (Metropolitan Museum of Art, New York City).

As a copyist at the Louvre, Morisot met and befriended other artists such as Manet and Monet. In 1861 she was introduced to Jean-Baptiste-Camille Corot, the pivotal landscape painter of the Barbizon school who also excelled in figure painting. Under Corot's influence, she took up the plein air (outdoors) method of working. By 1863 she was studying under Achille Oudinot, another Barbizon painter. In the winter of 1863–64 she studied sculpture under Aimé Millet, but none of her sculptures is known to survive.

== Main periods of Morisot's work ==
=== Training, 1857–1870 ===
It is hard to trace the stages of Morisot's training and to tell the exact influence of her teachers because she was never pleased with her work and she destroyed nearly all of the artworks she produced before 1869. Morisot began her first art lessons in 1857, and her first teacher, Geoffroy-Alphonse Chocarne, taught her the basics of drawing. After several months, Morisot began to take issue with the dull and monotonic nature of Chocarne's teaching, requesting a new teacher. She subsequently began to take classes taught by Guichard. During this period, she drew mostly ancient classical figures. When Morisot expressed her interest in plein air painting, Guichard sent her to follow Corot and Oudinot. Painting outdoors, she used watercolours, which were easy to carry. At that time, Morisot also became interested in pastel.

=== Watercolour, 1870–1874 ===
During this period, Morisot still found oil painting difficult, and worked mostly in watercolours. Her choice of colours is rather restrained; however, the delicate repetition of hues renders a balanced effect. Due to specific characteristics of watercolours as a medium, Morisot was able to create a translucent atmosphere and feathery touch, which contribute to the freshness of her paintings.

=== Impressionism, 1875–1885 ===
Having become more confident about oil painting, Morisot worked in oil, watercolours and pastel at the same time, as Degas did. She painted very quickly but did much sketching as preparation, so she could paint "a mouth, eyes, and a nose with a single brushstroke." She made countless studies of her subjects, which were drawn from her life so she became quite familiar with them. When it became inconvenient to paint outdoors, the highly finished watercolours done in the preparatory stages allowed her to continue painting indoors later. In 1874, Berthe's submission to the Salon was rejected; it would be the last time she would submit a piece to the exhibition. That same year, Berthe showed ten works at the First Impressionist Exhibition, notably being the only woman who exhibits. She exhibited with the Impressionists from 1874 onwards, only missing the exhibition in 1879 when her daughter Julie was born.

Impressionism's claimed attachment to brilliant colour, sensual surface effects, and fleeting sensory perceptions led a number of critics to assert in retrospect that this style, once primarily the battlefield of insouciant, combative males, was inherently feminine and best suited to women's weaker temperaments, lesser intellectual capabilities, and greater sensibility.

During Morisot's 1874 exhibition with the Impressionists, such as Monet and Manet, Le Figaro critic Albert Wolff noted that the Impressionists consisted of "five or six lunatics of which one is a woman...[whose] feminine grace is maintained amid the outpourings of a delirious mind."

Morisot's mature career began in 1872. She found an audience for her work with Durand-Ruel, the private dealer, who bought twenty-two paintings. In 1877, she was described by the critic for Le Temps as the "one real Impressionist in this group." She chose to exhibit under her full maiden name instead of using a pseudonym or her married name. As her skill and style improved, many began to rethink their opinion toward Morisot. In the 1880 exhibition, many reviews judged Morisot among the best, even including Le Figaro critic Albert Wolff.

=== Turning, 1885–1887 ===
After 1885, drawing began to dominate in Morisot's works. Morisot actively experimented with charcoals and coloured pencils. Her reviving interest in drawing was motivated by her Impressionist friends, who are known for blurring forms. Morisot put her emphasis upon the clarification of the form and lines during this period. In addition, she was influenced by photography and Japonism. She adopted the style of placing objects away from the centre of the composition from Japanese prints of the time.

=== Synthesis, 1887–1895 ===
Morisot started to use the technique of squaring and the medium of tracing paper to transcribe her drawing to the canvas exactly. By employing this new method, Morisot was able to create compositions with more complicated interaction between figures. She stressed the composition and the forms while her Impressionist brushstrokes still remained. Her original synthesis of the Impressionist touch with broad strokes and light reflections, and the graphic approach featured by clear lines, made her late works distinctive.

== Style and technique ==
Because she was a female artist, Morisot's paintings were often described as being full of "feminine charm" by male critics, noting their elegance and lightness. In 1890, Morisot wrote in a notebook about her struggles to be taken seriously as an artist: "I don't think there has ever been a man who treated a woman as an equal and that's all I would have asked for, for I know I'm worth as much as they."

Her light brush-strokes often led to critics using the verb "effleurer" (to touch lightly, brush against) to describe her technique. In her early life, Morisot painted in the open air, as did other Impressionists, to look for truths in observation. Around 1880 she began painting on unprimed canvases—a technique Manet and Eva Gonzalès also experimented with at the time—and her brush-work became looser. In 1888–89, her brush-strokes transitioned from short, rapid strokes to long, sinuous ones that define form. The outer edges of her paintings were often left unfinished, allowing the canvas to show through and increasing the sense of spontaneity. After 1885, she worked mostly from preliminary drawings before beginning her oil paintings. She often worked in oil paint, watercolours, and pastel simultaneously, and sketched using various drawing media. Morisot's works are almost always small in scale.

Grain field (c. 1875), Musée d'Orsay

Morisot created a sense of space and depth through the use of colour. Although her colour palette was somewhat limited, her fellow impressionists regarded her as a "virtuoso colourist". She typically made expansive use of white to create a sense of transparency, whether used as a pure white or mixed with other colours. In her large painting The Cherry Tree, the colours are more vivid but still emphasise the form.

Inspired by Manet's drawings, she kept the use of colour to a minimum when constructing a motif. Responding to the experiments conducted by Manet and Edgar Degas, Morisot used barely tinted whites to harmonise the paintings. Like Degas, she played with three media simultaneously in one painting: watercolour, pastels, and oil paints. In the second half of her career, she learned from Renoir by mimicking his motifs. She also shared with Renoir an interest in keeping a balance between the density of figures and the atmospheric traits of light in her later works.

== Subjects ==
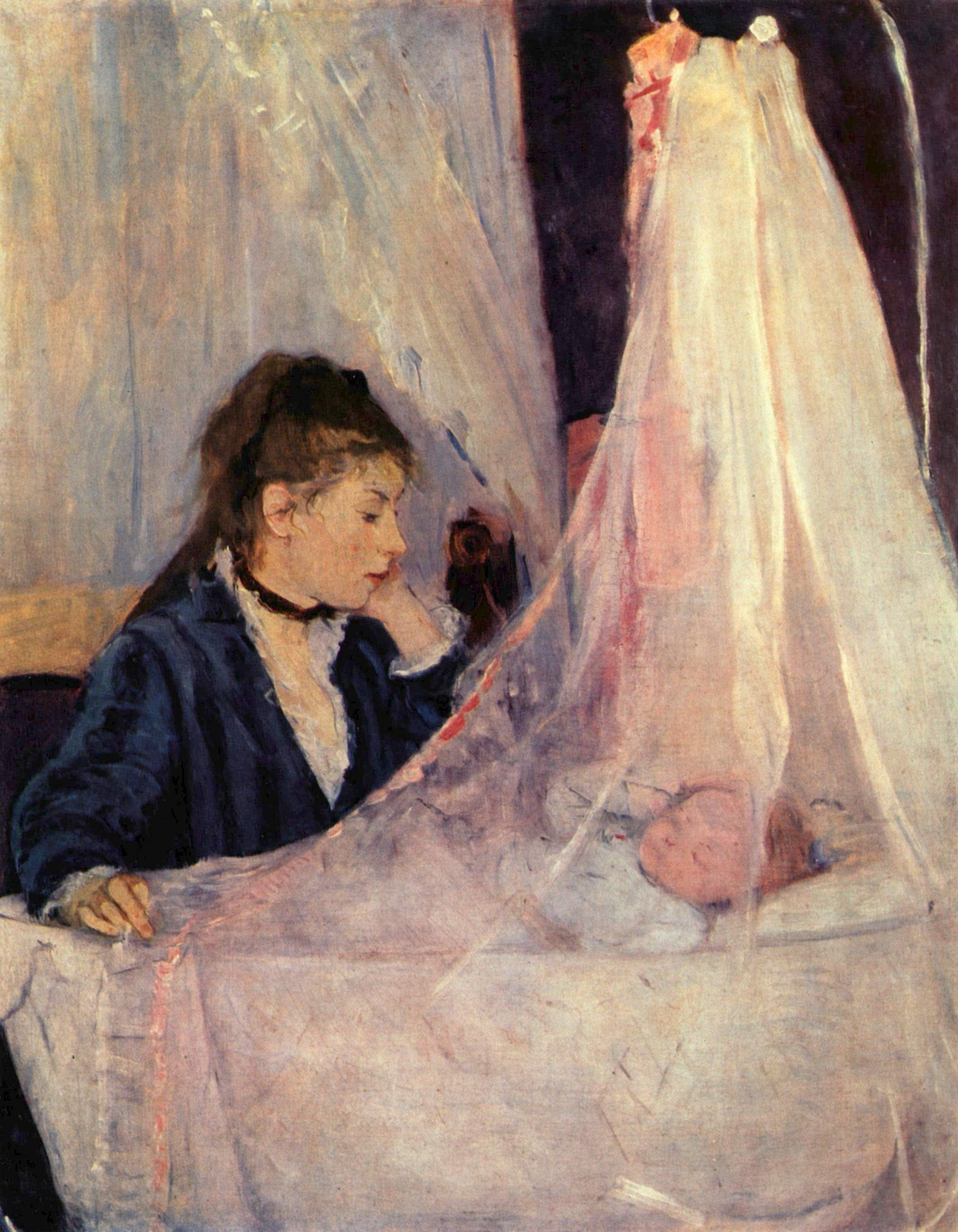
The Cradle (1872), Musée d'Orsay

Morisot painted what she experienced on a daily basis. Most of her paintings include domestic scenes of family, children, ladies, and flowers, depicting what women's life was like in the late nineteenth century. Instead of portraying the public space and society, Morisot preferred private, intimate scenes. This reflects the cultural restrictions of her class and gender at that time. Like her fellow Impressionist Mary Cassatt, she focused on domestic life and portraits in which she could use family and personal friends as models, including her daughter Julie and sister Edma. The stenographic presentation of her daily life conveys a strong hope to stop the fleeting passage of time. By portraying flowers, she used metaphors to celebrate womanhood. Prior to the 1860s, Morisot painted subjects in line with the Barbizon school before turning to scenes of contemporary femininity. Paintings like The Cradle (1872), in which she depicted current trends for nursery furniture, reflect her sensitivity to fashion and advertising, both of which would have been apparent to her female audience. Her works also include landscapes, garden settings, boating scenes, and themes of boredom or ennui. Later in her career Morisot worked with more ambitious themes, such as nudes. In her late works, she often referred to the past to recall a memory from her earlier life and youth, and her departed companions.

== Personal life ==
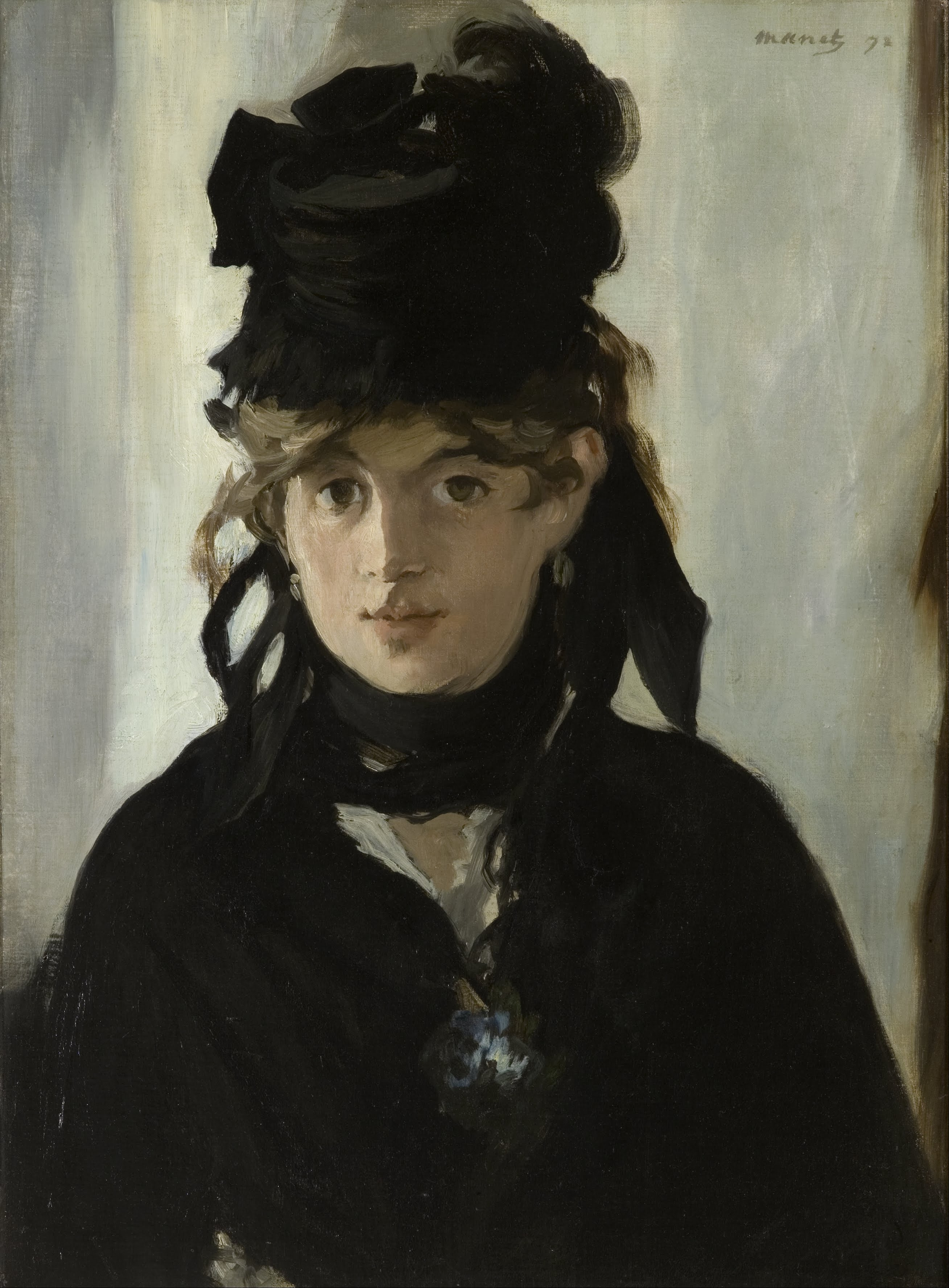
Édouard Manet – Berthe Morisot with a Bouquet of Violets (1872), Musée d'Orsay. In mourning for her father.

Morisot came from an eminent family, the daughter of a senior government official and the great-niece of Rococo artist Jean-Honoré Fragonard. Henri Fantin-Latour, a fellow artist, introduced Morisot to Édouard Manet in 1868. She became his longtime friend and colleague, and she married his brother, Eugène Manet, in 1874. On 14 November 1878, she gave birth to her only child, Julie, later a painter and art collector, who posed frequently for her mother and other Impressionist artists, including Renoir and her uncle Édouard.

Correspondence between Morisot and Édouard Manet shows warm affection, and Manet gave her an easel as a Christmas present. Morisot often posed for Manet and there are several portrait paintings of Morisot such as Repose (Portrait of Berthe Morisot) and Berthe Morisot with a Bouquet of Violets. Morisot died on 2 March 1895, in Paris, of pneumonia contracted while attending to her daughter Julie's similar illness, thus making Julie an orphan at the age of 16. The day before she died, Berthe wrote to Julie:

My little Julie, I love you as I die; I shall still love you when I am dead; I beg you not to cry, this parting was inevitable. I hoped to live until you were married.... Work and be good as you have always been; you have not caused me one sorrow in your little life. You have beauty, money; make good use of them.... Please give a remembrance to your Aunt Edma and to your cousins.

Berthe Morisot was interred in the Cimetière de Passy.

It has been speculated that there was a repressed love between Manet and Morisot, exemplified by the numerous portraits he did of her before she married his brother.

== Works ==
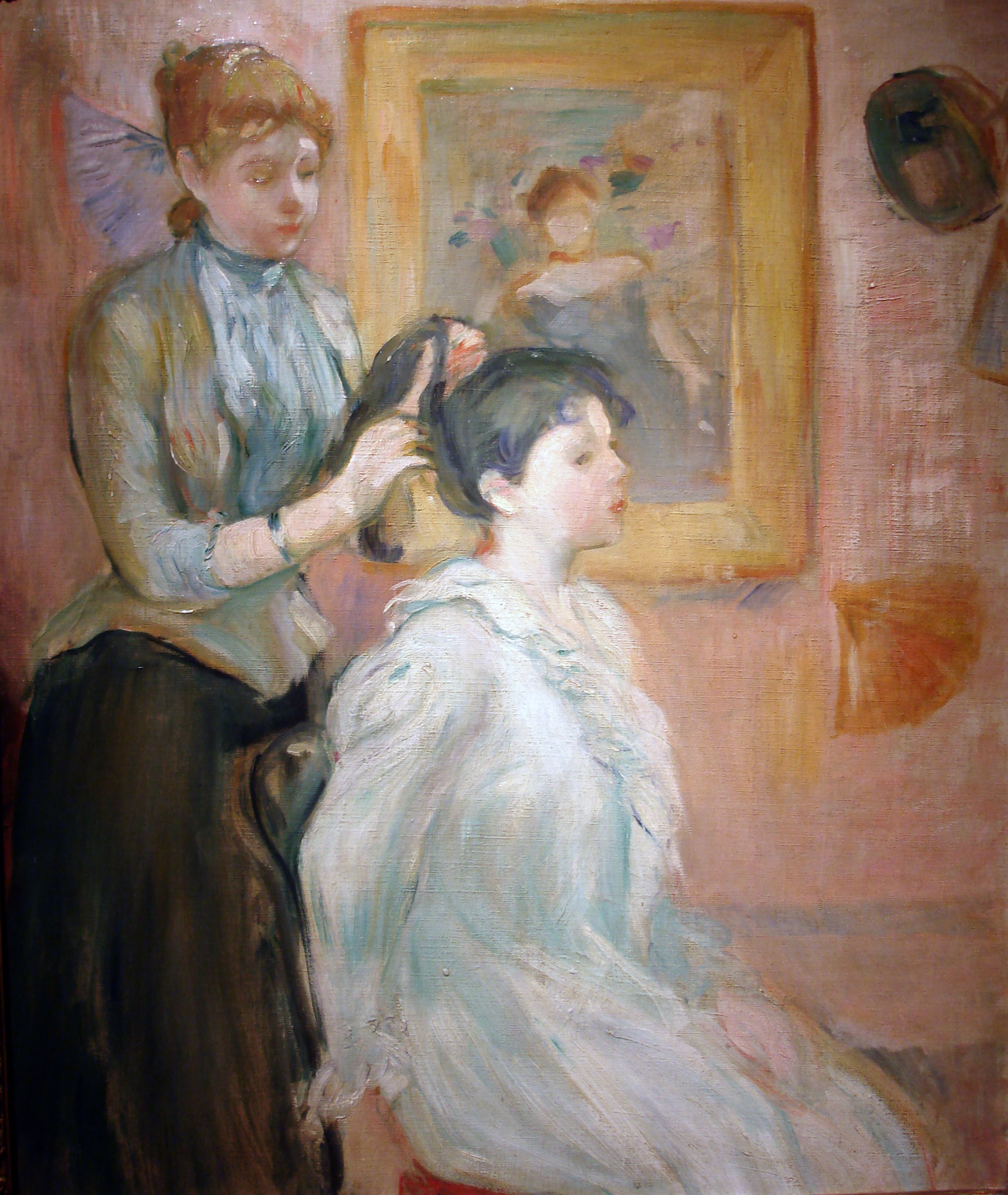
La Coiffure (1894)

=== Selection of works ===
This list is incomplete, you can help by expanding it with certified entries.

This limited selection is based in part on the book Berthe Morisot, Impressionist, by Charles F. Stuckey and William P. Scott, with the assistance of Suzanne G. Lindsay, which is in turn drawn from the 1961 catalogue by Marie-Louise Bataille, Denis Rouart, and Georges Wildenstein. There are variations between the dates of execution, first showing, and purchase. Titles may vary between sources.

=== 1864–1874 ===
- Étude (1864), oil on canvas, 60.3 × 73 cm, private collection
- Chaumière en Normandie (1865), oil on canvas, 46 × 55 cm, private collection
- La Seine en aval du pont d'Iéna (1866), oil on canvas, 51 × 73 cm, private collection
- La Rivière de Pont Aven à Roz-Bras (1867), oil on canvas, 55 × 73 cm, private collection – Chicago
- Bateaux à l'aurore (1869), pastel on paper, 19.7 × 26.7 cm, private collection
- The Artist's Sister at a Window (Note: Title in French: Jeune femme à sa fenêtre or Portrait de Madame Pontillon) (1869), oil on canvas, 54.8 x 46.3 cm, National Gallery of Art Washington
- The Sisters (1869), National Gallery of Art Washington
- The Mother and Sister of the Artist (Note: Title in French: Madame Morisot et sa fille Madame Pontillon (La Lecture)) (1869–1870), oil on canvas, 101 × 81.8 cm, National Gallery of Art Washington
- The Harbour at Lorient (Note: Title in French: Vue du petit port de Lorient) (1869), oil on canvas, 43 × 72 cm, National Gallery of Art Washington
- Le Port de Cherbourg (1871), crayon and watercolour on paper, 15.6 × 20.3 cm, private collection of Paul Mellon, United States
- Le Port de Cherbourg (1871), oil on canvas, 41.9 × 55.9 cm, private collection of Paul Mellon, United States
- Vue de paris de hauteurs du Trocadéro (1871), oil on canvas, 46.1 × 81.5 cm, Santa Barbara Museum of Art
- Woman and Child on the Balcony (Note: Title in French: Femme et enfant au balcon) (1871–72), watercolour, 20.6 × 17.3 cm, Art Institute of Chicago
- Intérieur (1871), oil on canvas, 60 × 73 cm, private collection
- Portrait of Madame Pontillon (1871), pastel on paper, 85.5 × 65.8 cm, Louvre (Note: drawings cabinet gift of Madame Edma Pontillon to the Louvre in 1921, in the collection of the Musée d'Orsay)
- L'Entrée du port (1871), (Note: The scene L'Entrée du port is often confused with L'Entrée du port de Cherbourg purchased in 1874 by Durand-Ruel, or confused with Le Port de Cherbourg) watercolour on paper, 24.9 × 15.1 cm, Musée Léon-Alègre, Bagnols-sur-Cèze – drawings cabinet
- Madame Pontillon et sa fille Jeanne sur un canapé (1871), watercolour on paper, 25.1 × 25.9 cm, National Gallery of Art Washington
- Jeune fille sur un banc (Edma Pontillon) (1872), oil on canvas, 33 × 41 cm
- Cache-cache (1872), oil on canvas, 33 × 41 cm, Private collection
- The Cradle (Note: Title in French: Le Berceau) (1872), oil on canvas, 56 × 46 cm, Musée d'Orsay
- Reading (portrait of Edma Morisot) (Note: Title in French: L'ombrelle verte or La Lecture (Edma lisant)) (1873), oil on canvas, 45.1 × 72.4 cm, Cleveland Museum of Art
- Sur la plage des Petites-Dalles (1873), oil on canvas, 24.1 × 50.2 cm, Virginia Museum of Fine Arts
- Madame Boursier et sa fille (1873), oil on canvas, 74 × 52 cm, Virginia Museum of Fine Arts
- Le Village de Maurecourt (1873), pastel on paper, 47 × 71.8 cm, private collection
- Coin de Paris vu de Passy (1873), pastel on paper, 27 × 34.9 cm, private collection
- Sur la terrasse (1874), oil on canvas, 45 × 54 cm, Musée du Petit Palais
- In a Villa by the Seaside (1874), oil on canvas,50.2 x 61 cm, Norton Simon Museum
- Portrait de Madame Hubbard (1874), oil on canvas, 50.5 × 81 cm, Ordrupgaard
- Femme et enfant au bord de la mer (1874), watercolour on paper, 16 × 21.3 cm, private collection
- In a Park (Note: Title in French: Dans le parc) (c. 1874), pastel on paper, 72.5 × 91.8 cm, Musée du Petit Palais

=== 1875–1884 ===
- Percher de blanchisseuses (1875), oil on canvas 33 × 40.8 cm, National Gallery of Art Washington
- Hanging the Laundry out to Dry (Note: Title in French: Suspendre le linge pour sécher) (1875), National Gallery of Art Washington
- Jeune fille au miroir (1875), oil on canvas, 54 × 45 cm, private collection
- Scène de port dans l'île de Wight (1875), oil on canvas, 48 × 36 cm, private collection
- Scène de port dans l'île de Wight (1875), oil on canvas, 43 × 64 cm, Newark Museum
- Eugène Manet on the Isle of Wight (Note: Title in French: Eugène Manet à l'île de Wight) (1875), oil on canvas, 38 × 46 cm, private collection
- Avant d'un yacht (1875), watercolour on paper, 20.6 × 26.7 cm, Sterling and Francine Clark Art Institute
- Woman at her Toilette (Note: Title in French: Femme à sa toilette) (1875), oil on canvas, 46 × 38 cm, private collection
- Woman at her Toilette (1875–1880), 60.3 × 80.4 cm, Art Institute of Chicago
- Portrait de femme (Avant le théâtre) (1875), oil on canvas, 57 × 31 cm, Galerie Schröder & Leisewitz Bremen
- Jeune fille de dos à sa toilette (Woman at her Toilette) (1879), oil on canvas, 60.3 × 80.4 cm, Art Institute of Chicago
- Jeune femme au bal (Young Woman in Evening Dress (Note: Title in French: Jeune femme en toilette de bal)) (1876), oil on canvas, 86 × 53 cm, Musée d'Orsay
- Au Bal (Young Girl at the Ball (Note: Title in French: Jeune fille au bal)) (1875), oil on canvas, 62 × 52 cm, Musée Marmottan-Monet
- Jeune Femme arrosant un arbuste (1876), oil on canvas, 40.01 × 31.75 cm, Virginia Museum of Fine Arts
- Le Corsage noir (1876), oil on canvas, 73 × 59.8 cm, National Gallery of Ireland
- The Psyche Mirror (Note: Title in French: La Psyché) (1876), oil on canvas, 65 × 54 cm, Thyssen-Bornemisza Museum
- Rêveuse (1877), pastel on canvas, 50.2 × 61 cm, Nelson-Atkins Museum of Art
- L'Été (Jeune femme près d'une fenêtre) (1878), oil on canvas, 76 × 61 cm, Musée Fabre
- Jeune femme assise (1878–1879), oil on canvas, 80 × 100 cm, private collection, United States
- Summer's Day (Note: Title in French: Le Lac du Bois de Boulogne (Jour d'été)) (1879), 45.7 × 75.3 cm, National Gallery London
- Dans le jardin (Dames cueillant des fleurs) (1879), oil on canvas, 61 × 73.5 cm, Nationalmuseum Stockholm
- Young Woman in Evening Dress (Note: Title in French: Jeune femme en toilette de bal) (1879), oil on canvas, 71 x 54 cm, Musée d'Orsay
- Winter (Woman with a Muff) (1880), oil on canvas, 73.5 × 58.5 cm, Dallas Museum of Art
- Deux filles assises près d'une table (1880), crayon and watercolour on paper, 19,6 × 26.6 cm, private collection, Germany
- Bateaux sur la Seine (c. 1880), 25.5 × 50 cm (Note: Provenance: acquired from the artist's family by the first owner, sold with a letter of authenticity from Daniel Wildenstein at Sotheby's, 1984.)
- Child among the Hollyhocks (Note: Title in French: Enfant dans les roses trémières) (1881), Wallraf-Richartz Museum
- Plage à Nice (1881–1882), watercolour on paper, 42 × 55 cm, Nationalmuseum Stockholm
- Le Port de Nice (1881–1882), oil on canvas, 53 × 43 cm, private collection
- Le Port de Nice (1881–1882), oil on canvas, 41 × 55 cm, private collection
- Le Port de Nice (third version) (c. 1881), 38 × 46 cm, Dallas Museum of Art
- Le Thé (1882), oil on canvas, 57.5 × 71.5 cm, Fondation Madelon Vaduz
- La Fable (1883), oil on canvas, 65 × 81 cm, private collection
- Le Jardin (Femmes dans le jardin) (1882–1883), oil on canvas, 99.1 × 127 cm, Sara Lee Corporation
- Eugène Manet et sa fille au jardin (1883), oil on canvas, 60 × 73, private collection
- Dans le jardin à Maurecourt (1883), oil on canvas, 54 × 65 cm, Toledo Museum of Art
- Le Quai de Bougival (1883), oil on canvas, 55.5 × 46 cm, National Gallery Oslo
- Julie et son bateau (Enfant jouant) (1883), watercolour on paper, 25 × 16 cm, private collection
- La Meule de foin (1883), oil on canvas, 55.3 × 45.7 cm, private collection, United States
- In The Garden at Maurecourt (1884), oil on canvas, 54 × 65.1 cm, Toledo Museum of Art
- Dans la véranda (1884), oil on canvas, 81 × 10 cm, private collection
- Julie avec sa poupée (1884), oil on canvas, 82 × 10 cm, private collection
- Petite fille avec sa poupée (Julie Manet) (1884), pastel on paper, 60 × 46 cm, private collection
- Sur le lac (1884), oil on canvas, 65 × 54 cm, private collection
- The Artist's Daughter, Julie, with her Nanny (c. 1884), oil on canvas, Minneapolis Institute of Art

=== 1885–1894 ===
- Autoportrait (1885), pastel on paper, 47.5 × 37.5 cm, Art Institute of Chicago
- Autoportrait avec Julie (1885), oil on canvas, 72 × 91 cm, private collection
- Jeune femme assise au Bois de Boulogne (1885), watercolour on paper, 19 × 28 cm, Metropolitan Museum of Art
- La Forêt de Compiègne (1885), oil on canvas, 54.2 × 64.8 cm, Art Institute of Chicago
- The Bath (Girl Arranging Her Hair) (Note: Title in French: Le Bain (Jeune file se coiffant)) (1885–1886), oil on canvas, 81.1 × 72.3 cm, Art Institute of Chicago
- In the Dining Room (Note: Title in French: Dans la salle à manger) (1885–1886), oil on canvas, 61.3 × 50 cm, National Gallery of Art Washington
- Le Lever (1886), oil on canvas, 65 × 54 cm, collection Durand-Ruel
- Intérieur à Jersey (Intérieur de cottage) (1886), oil on canvas, 50 × 60 cm, Musée communal des beaux-arts d'Ixelles
- Femme s'essuyant (1886–1887), pastel on paper, 42 × 41 cm, unknown
- Julie avec un chat (1887), drypoint, 14.5 × 11.3 cm, National Gallery of Art Washington
- Nu de dos (1887), charcoal on paper, 57 × 43 cm, private collection
- Éventail en médaillon (1887), watercolour on silk fan, private collection
- Portrait of Paule Gobillard (1887), coloured pencil on paper, 27.9 × 22.9 cm, Reader's Digest Association
- Le Lac du Bois de Boulogne (1887), watercolour on paper, 29.5 × 22.2 cm, National Museum of Women in the Arts Washington
- Fillette lisant (La lecture) (1888), oil on canvas, 74.3 × 92.7 cm, Museum of Fine Arts Florida
- Young Girl in a Park (Note: Title in French: Jeune Fille dans un parc) (1888–1893), oil on canvas, 90 × 81 cm, Musée des Augustins
- Berthe Morisot and Julie Manet (c.1888–1890), drypoint, 18.42 x 13.49 cm, Minneapolis Institute of Art
- La Cueillette des oranges (1889), pastel, 61 × 46 cm, Musée d'art et d'histoire de Provence
- La Petite Niçoise, 'The Small Girl from Nice' (1889), oil on canvas, 64 × 52 cm, Musée des Beaux-Arts de Lyon
- Sous l'oranger (Julie) (1889), oil on canvas, 54 × 65 cm, private collection
- L'Île du Bois de Boulogne (1889), oil on canvas, 68.4 × 54.6 cm, National Gallery of Art Washington
- Before the Mirror (1890), Fondation Pierre Gianadda
- The Flute Player (Note: Title in French: Le Flageolet (Julie Manet et Jeanne Gobillard)) (1891), oil on canvas, 56 × 87 cm, private collection
- Le Cerisier (1891), oil on canvas, 138 × 88.9 cm, private collection, United States
- Study for Le Cerisier (1891), pastel on paper, 45.7 × 48.9 cm, Reader's Digest Association
- Julie Manet avec son lévrier (Note: Also as Julie Manet et son Lévrier Laerte) (1893), oil on canvas, 73× 80 cm, Musée Marmottan Monet
- Les Enfants de Gabriel Thomas (1894), oil on canvas, 100 × 80 cm, Musée d'Orsay
- Two Girls (1894), The Phillips Collection
- La Coiffure (1894), oil on canvas, 100 × 80 cm, Museo Nacional de Bellas Artes Buenos Aires
- Jeune fille aux cheveux noirs (1894), pencil and watercolour, 23.1 × 16.8 cm, Philadelphia Museum of Art
- Jeune Fille au Manteau Vert, oil on canvas (c. 1894)
Selection of works

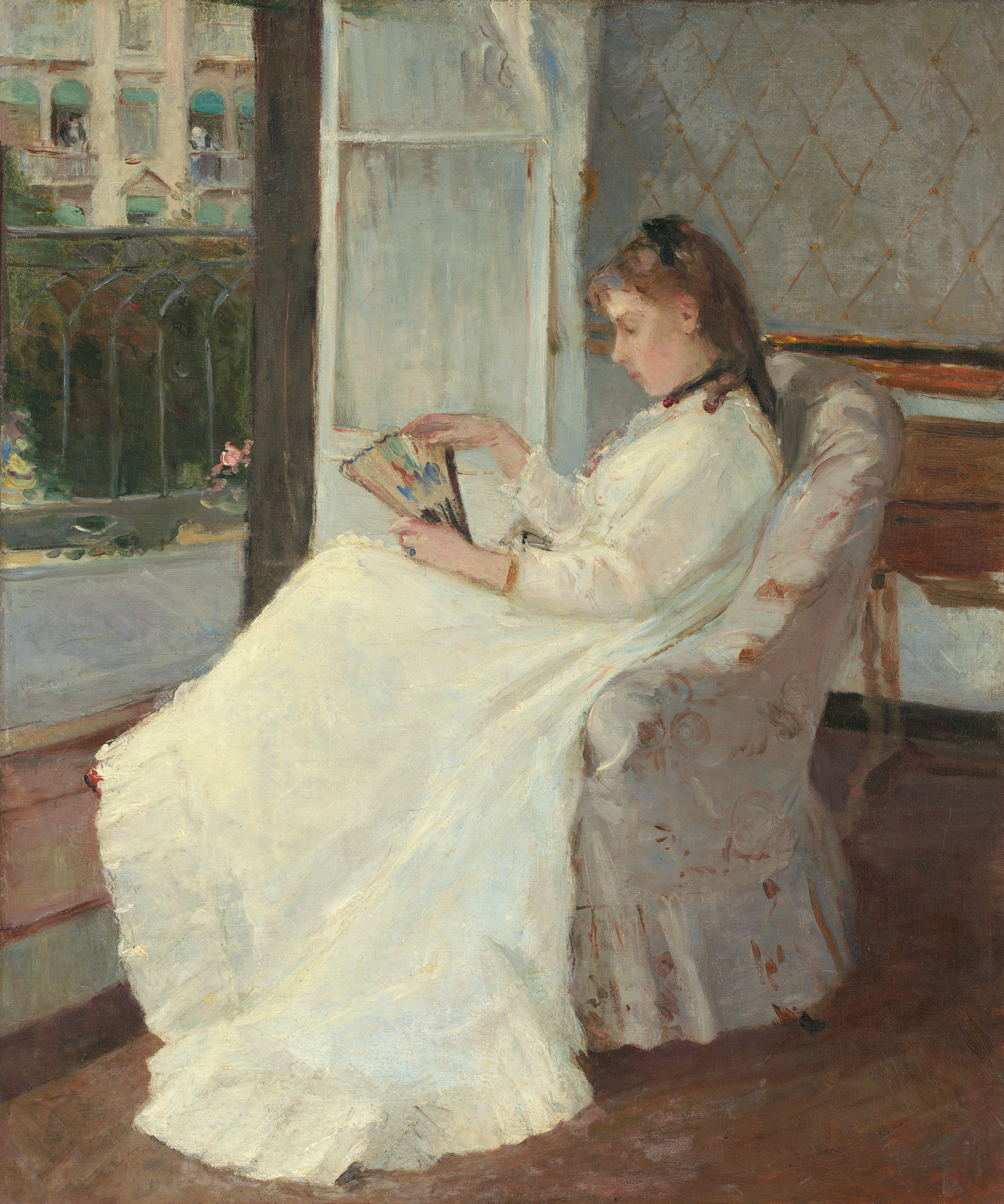
The Artist's Sister at a Window (1869), National Gallery of Art Washington

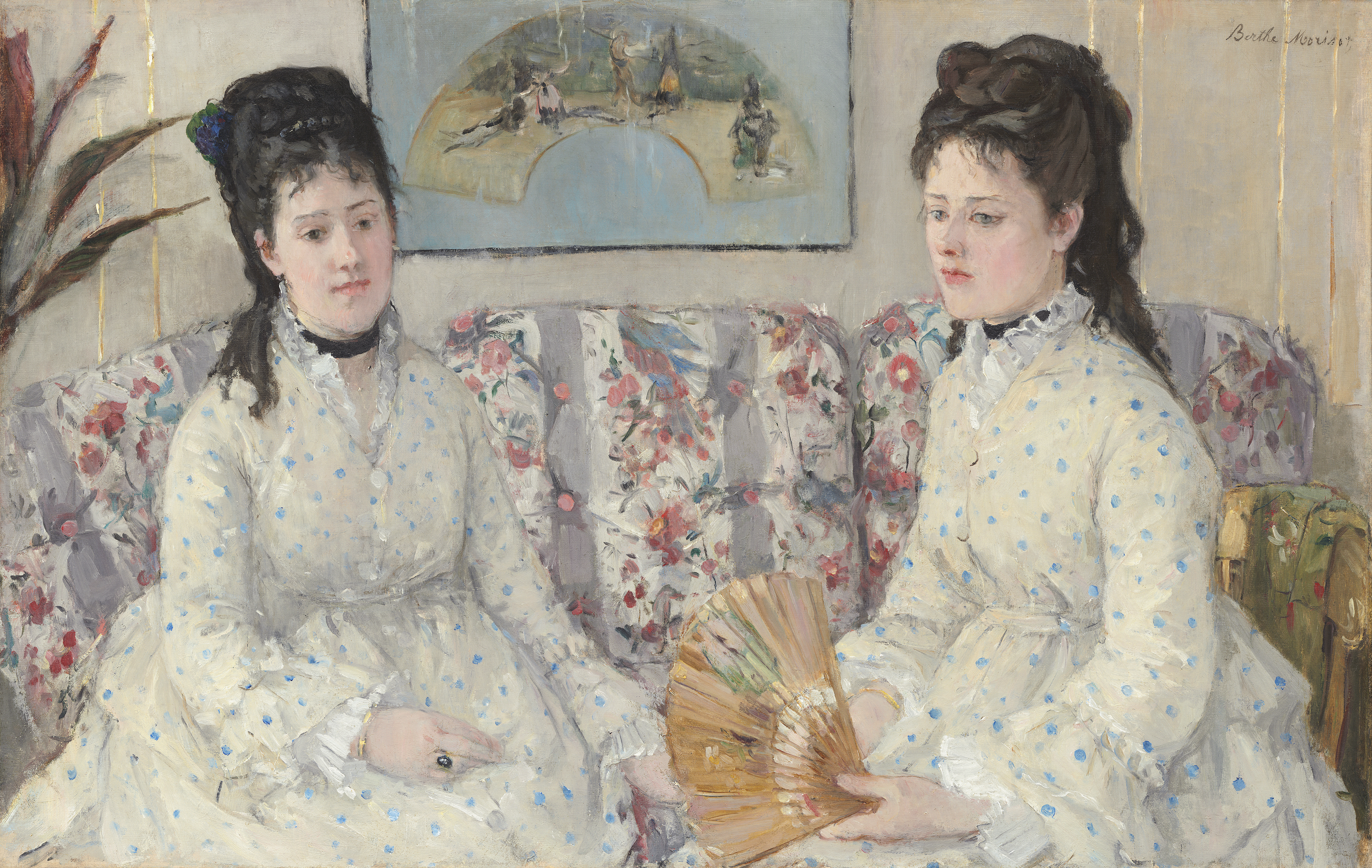
The Sisters (1869), National Gallery of Art Washington

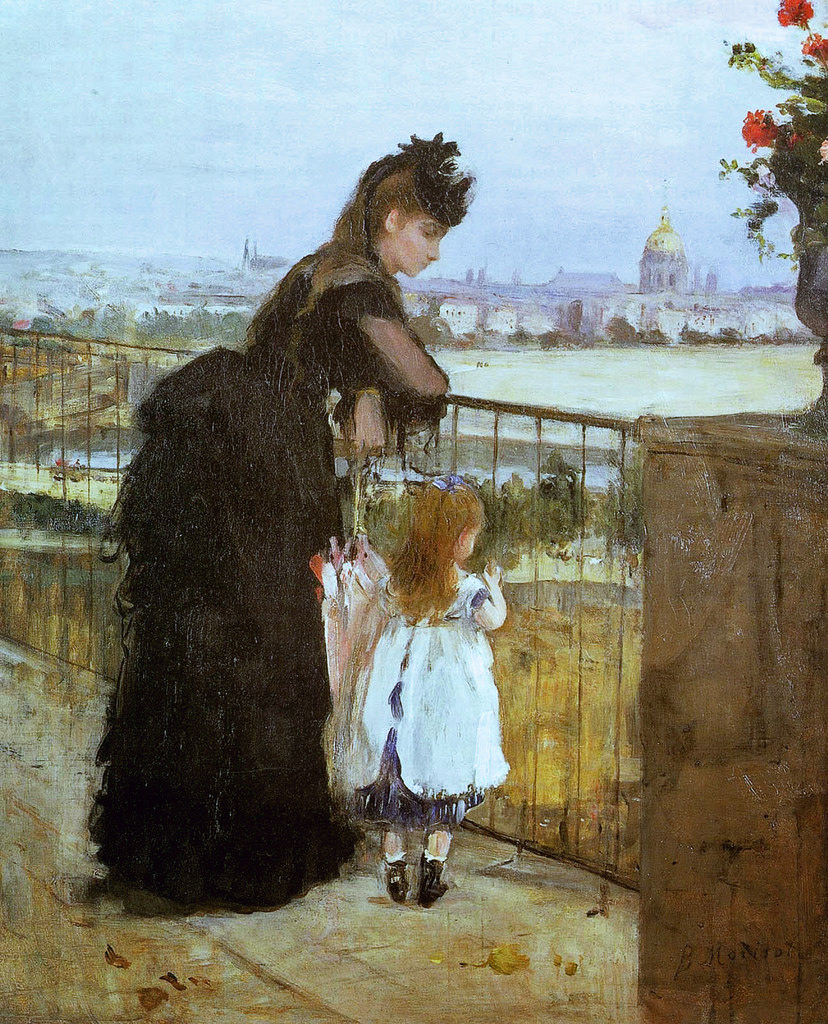
Woman and Child on the Balcony (1872), Artizon Museum

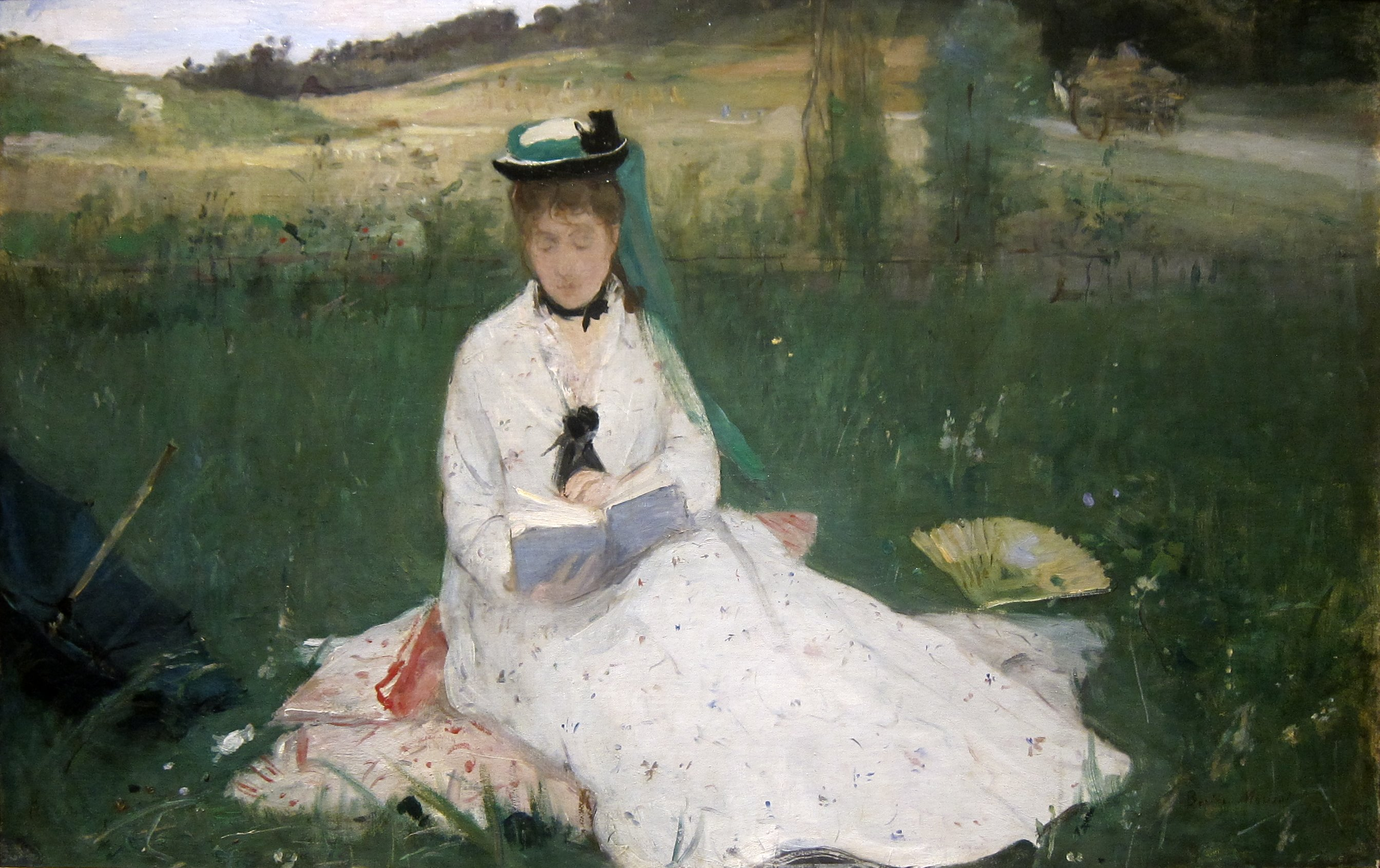
Reading (portrait of Edma Morisot) (1873), Cleveland Museum of Art

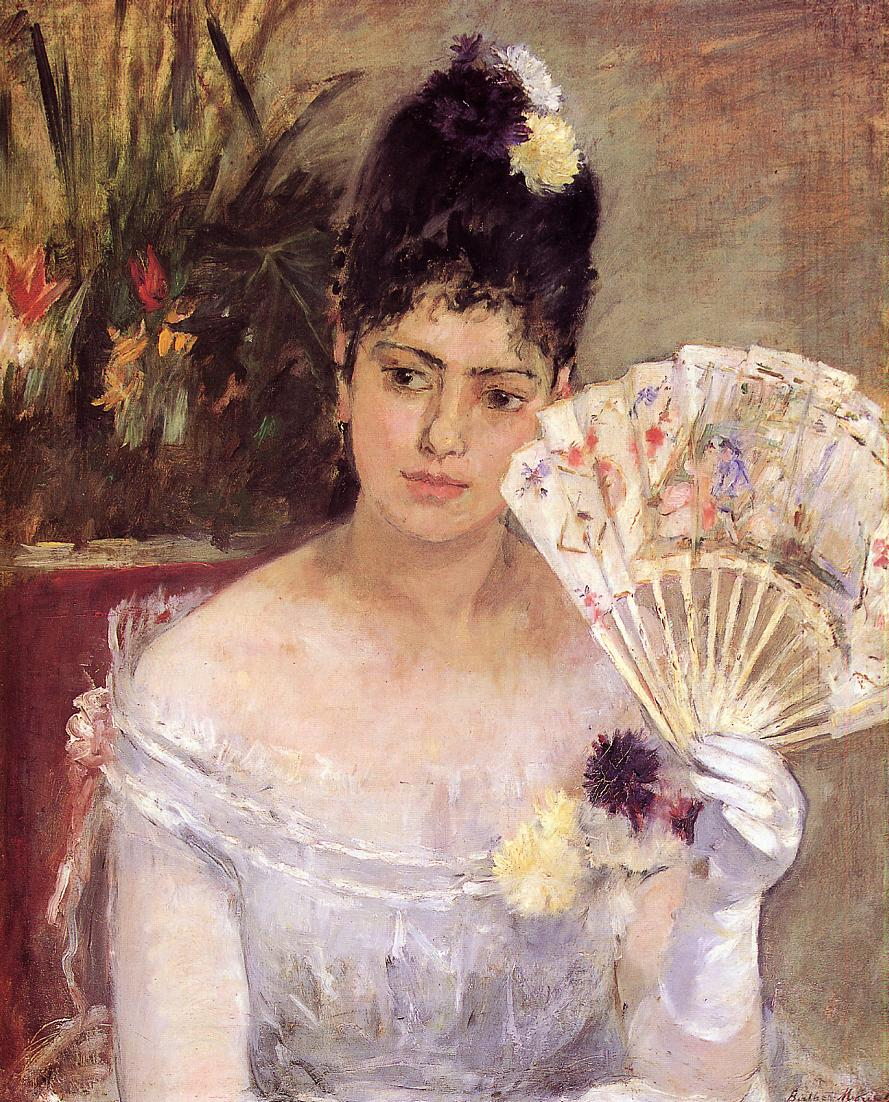
Au Bal (1875), Musée Marmottan-Monet

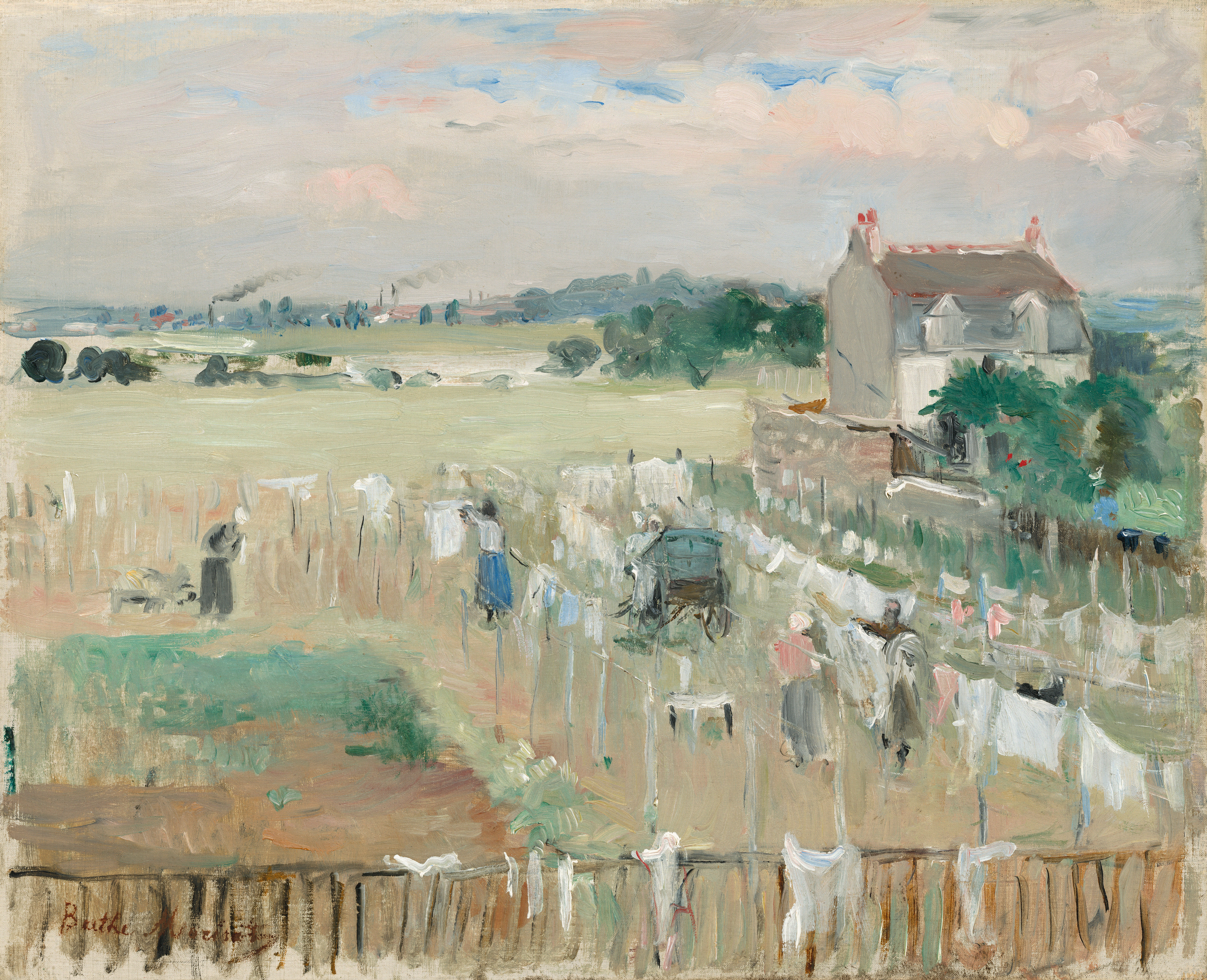
Hanging the Laundry out to Dry (1875), National Gallery of Art Washington

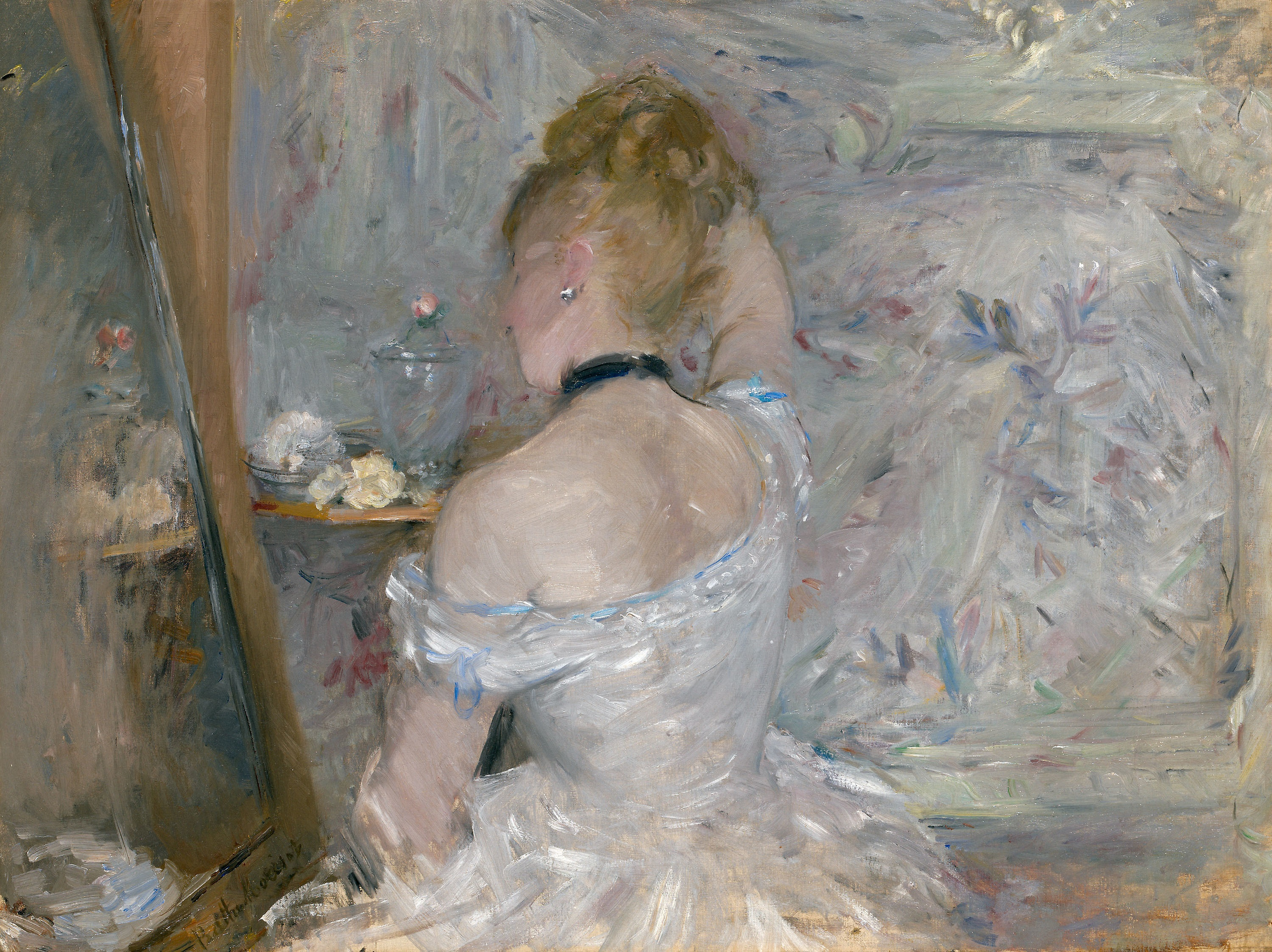
Woman at her Toilette (1875–1880), Art Institute of Chicago

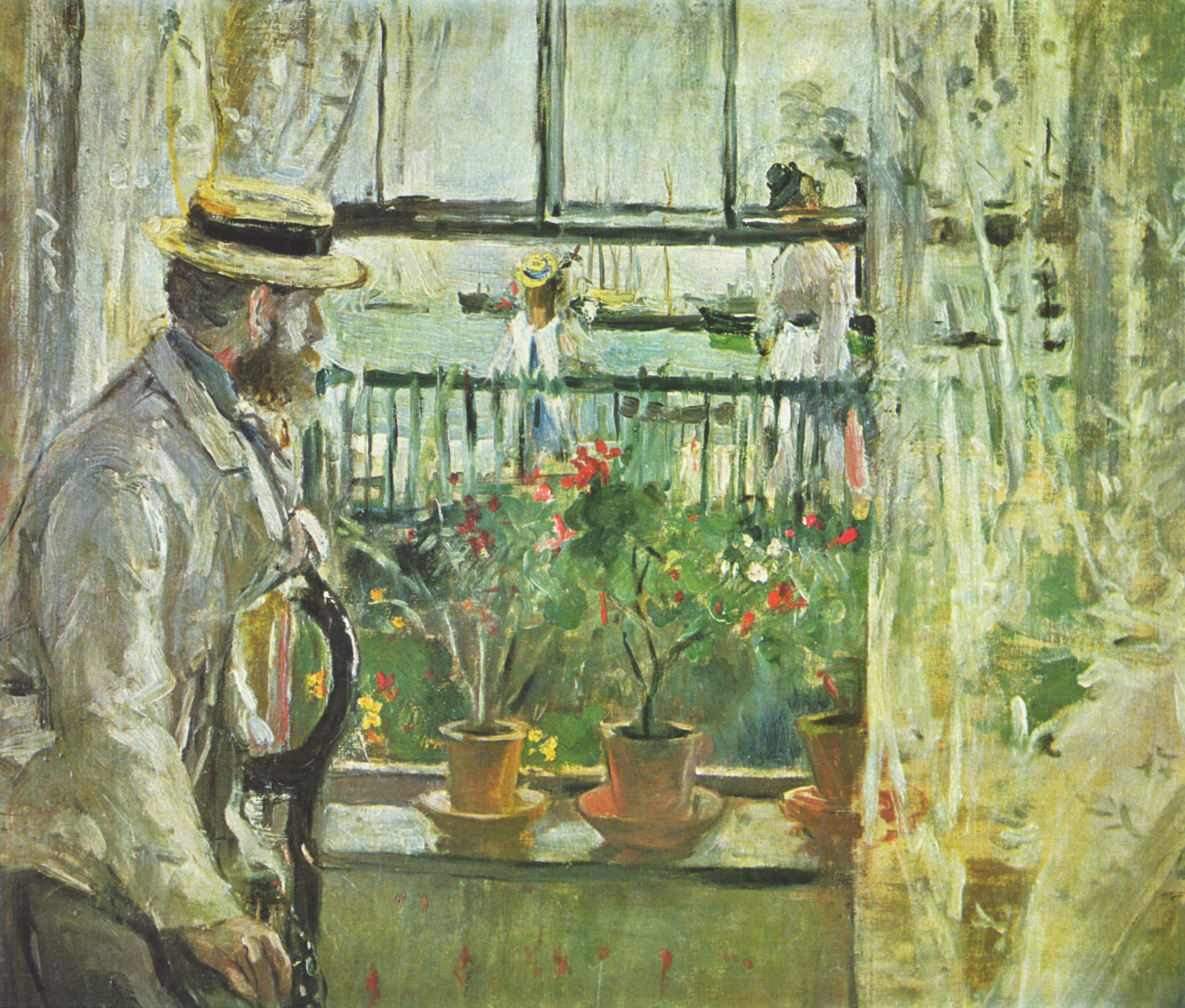
Eugène Manet on the Isle of Wight (1875), Musée Marmottan Monet

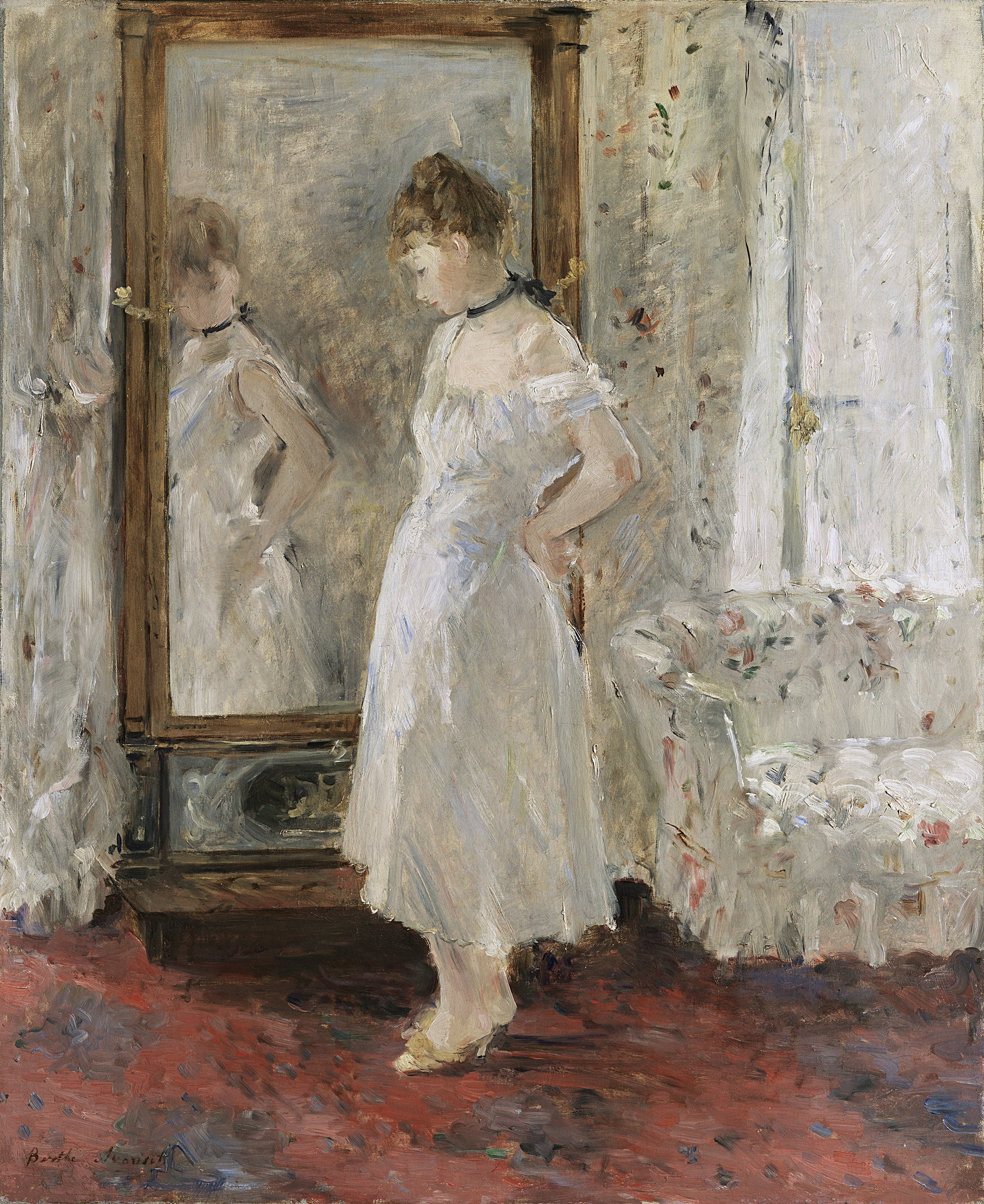
The Psyche Mirror (1876), Thyssen-Bornemisza Museum

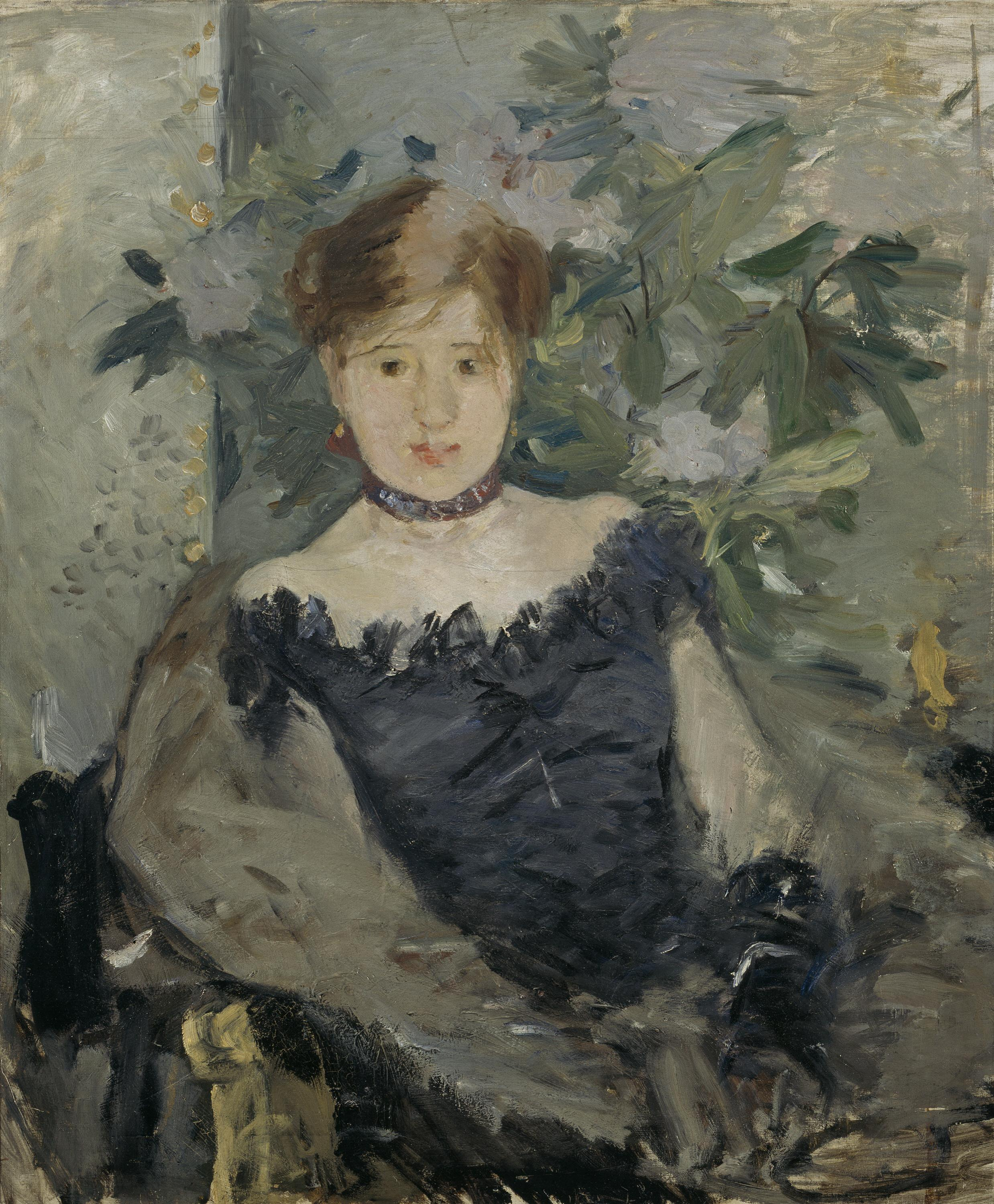
Le Corsage Noir (1878), National Gallery of Ireland, Dublin

Summer's Day (1879), National Gallery London

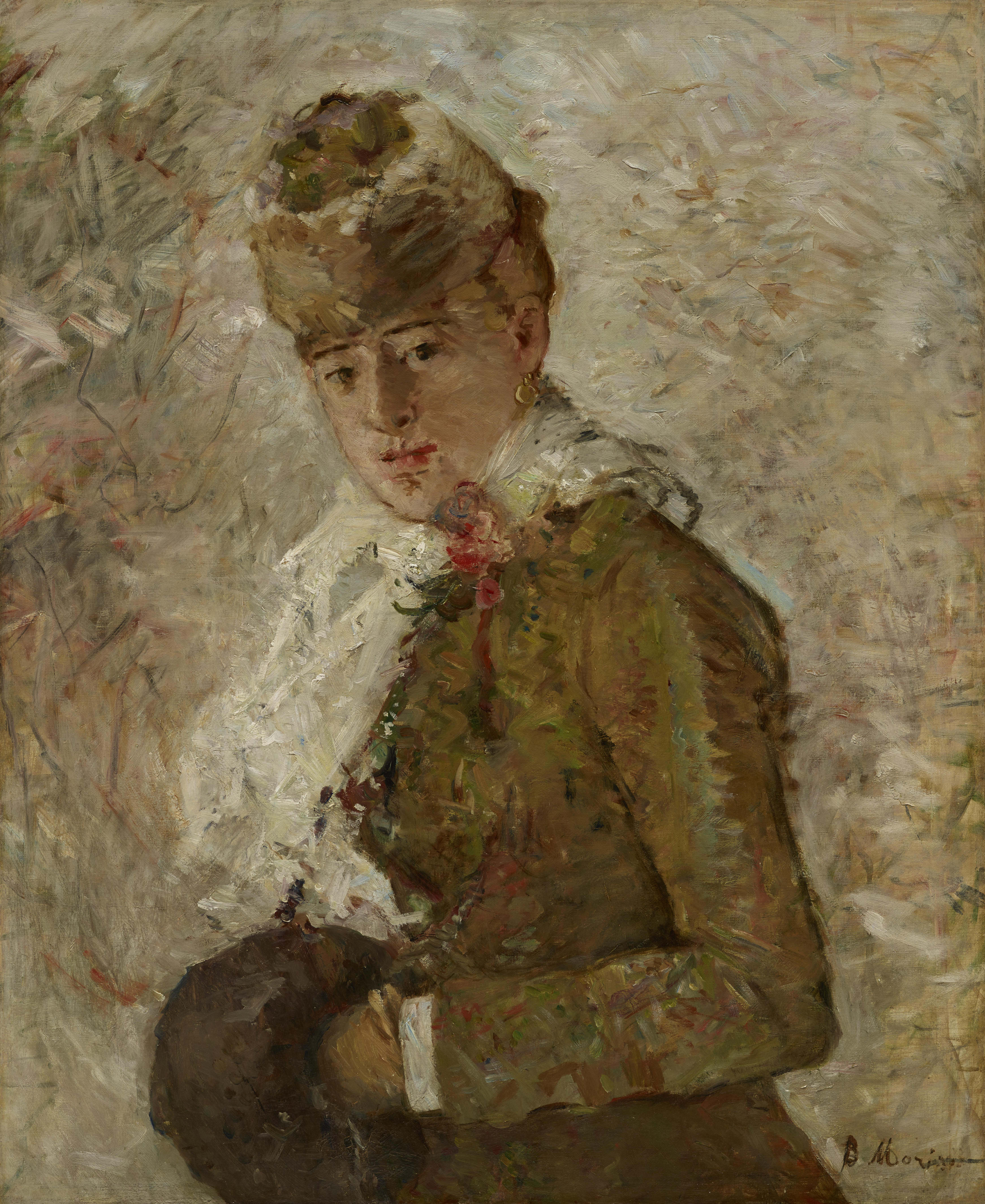
Winter (Woman with a Muff) (1880), Dallas Museum of Arts

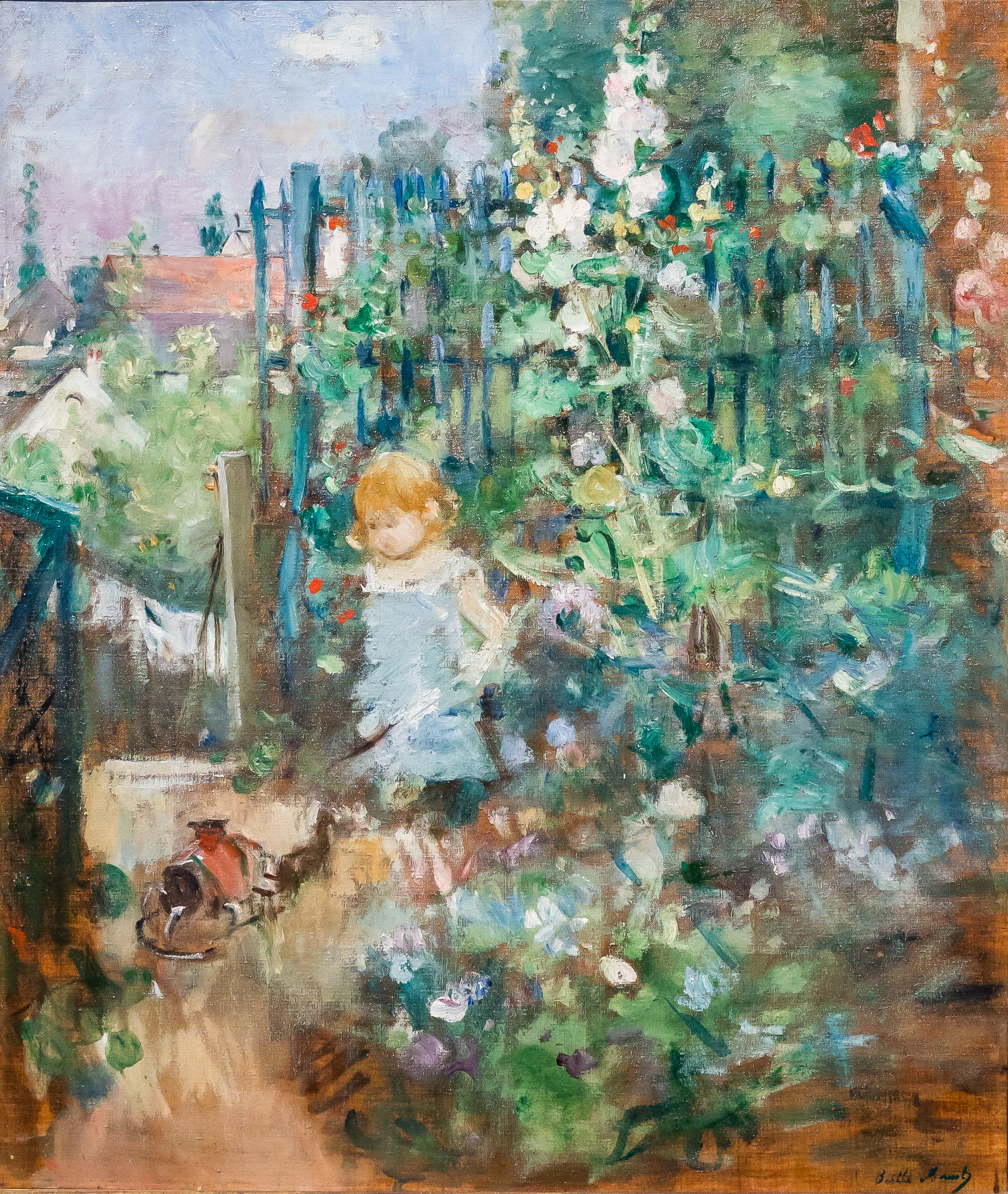
Child among the Hollyhocks (1881), Wallraf-Richartz Museum

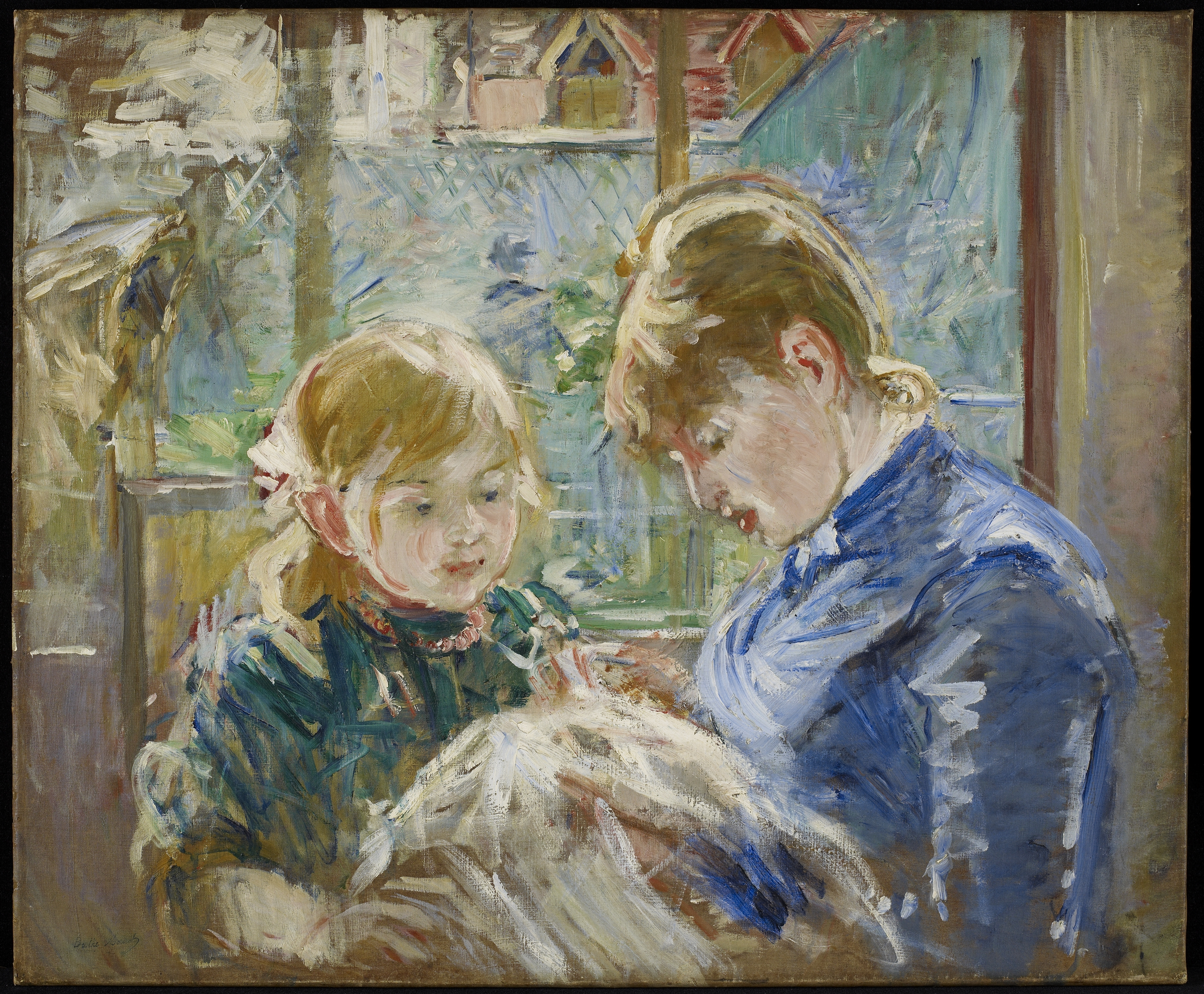
The Artists' Daughter Julie With Her Nanny (c.1884), Minneapolis Institute of Art

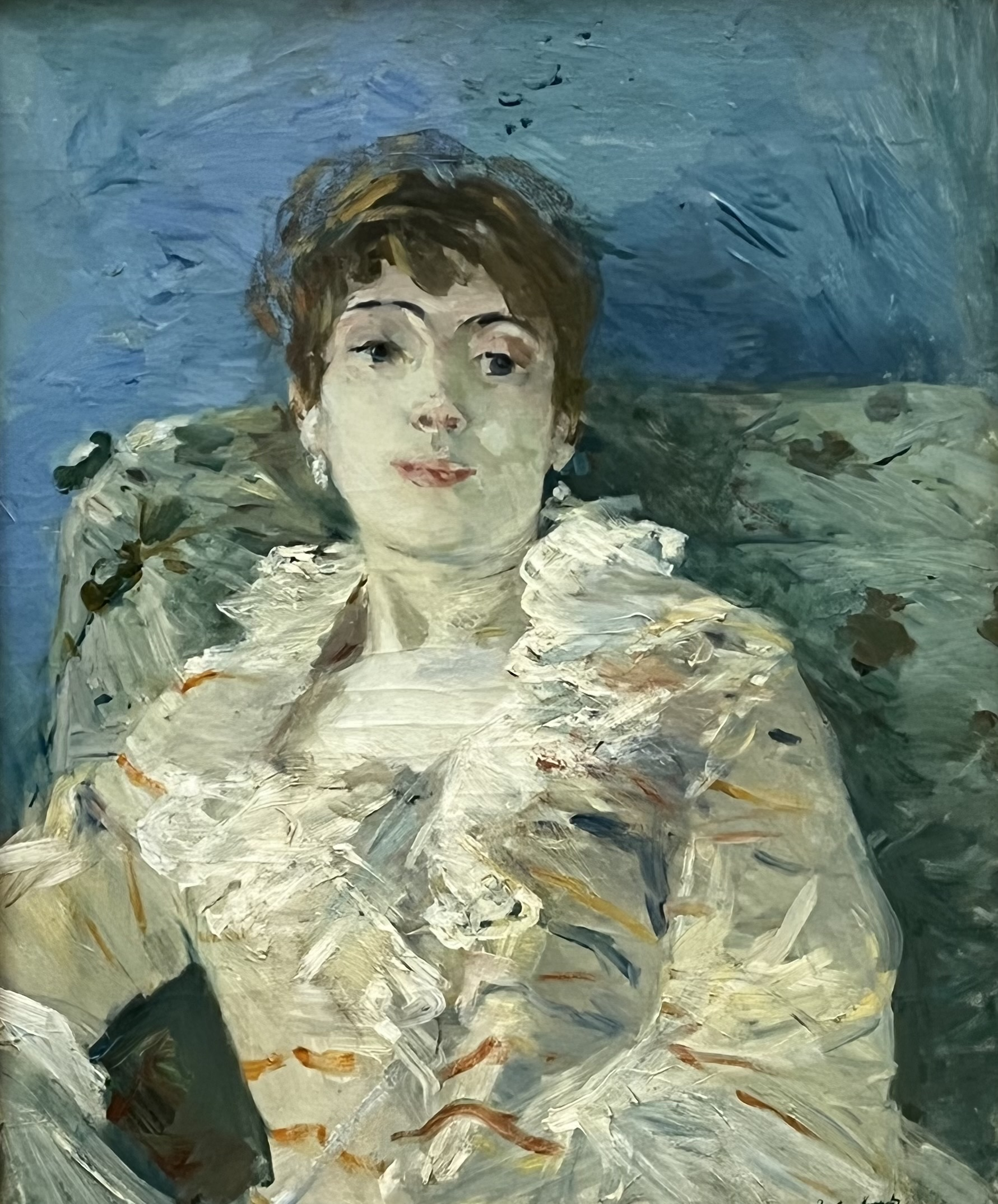
Girl on Divan (c. 1885), National Gallery London

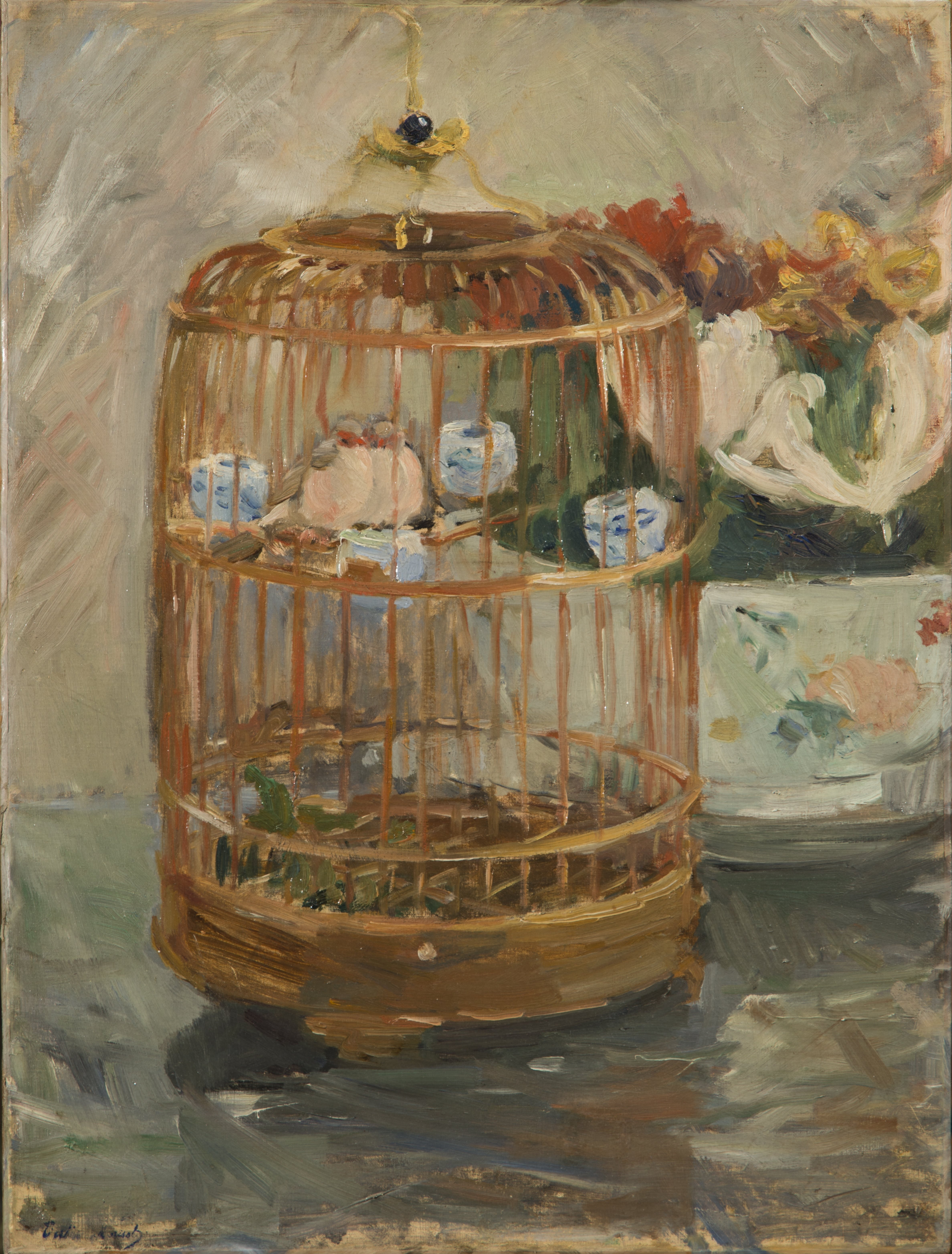
The Cage (1885), National Museum of Women in the Arts Washington

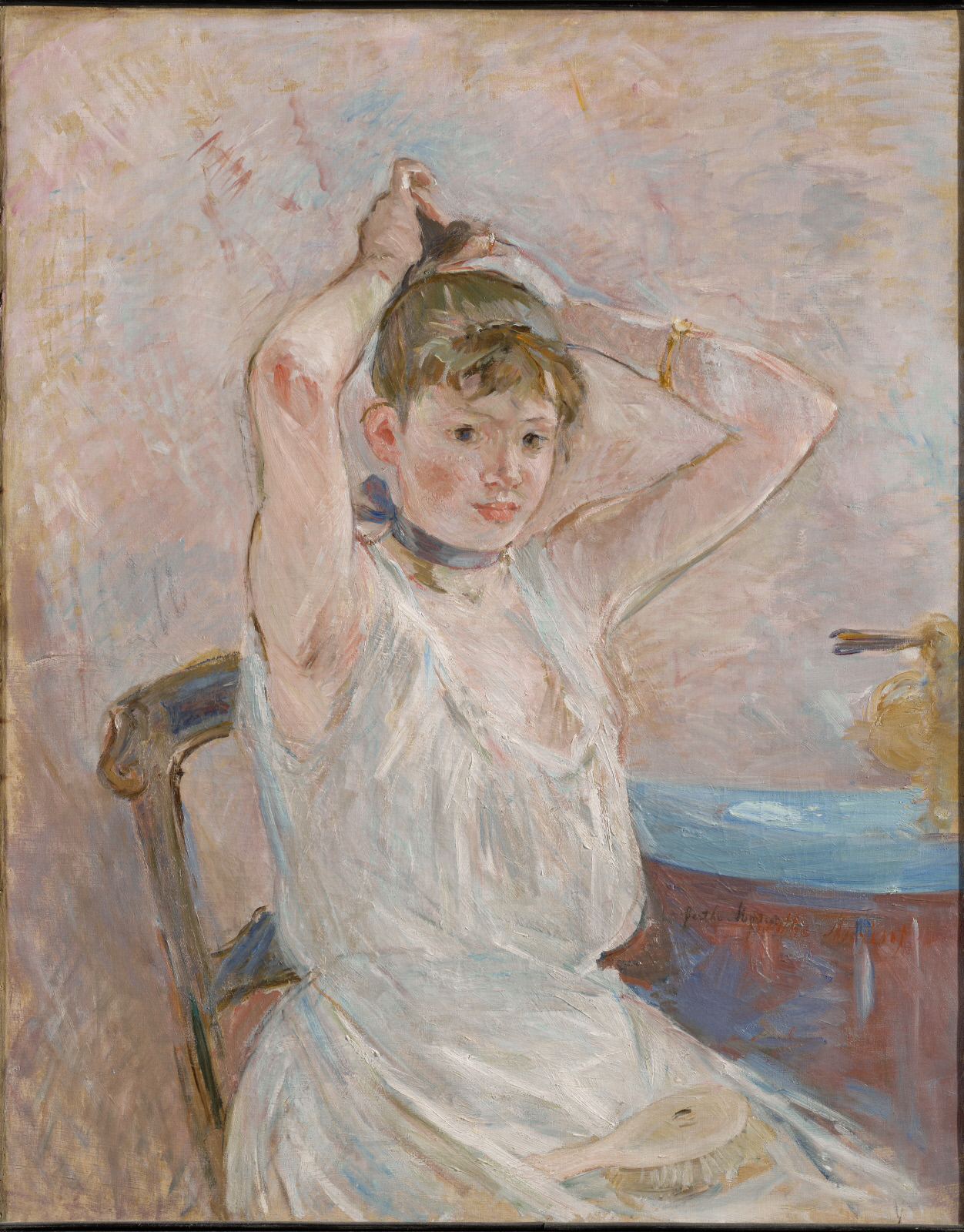
The Bath (Girl Arranging Her Hair) (1885–86), Clark Art Institute

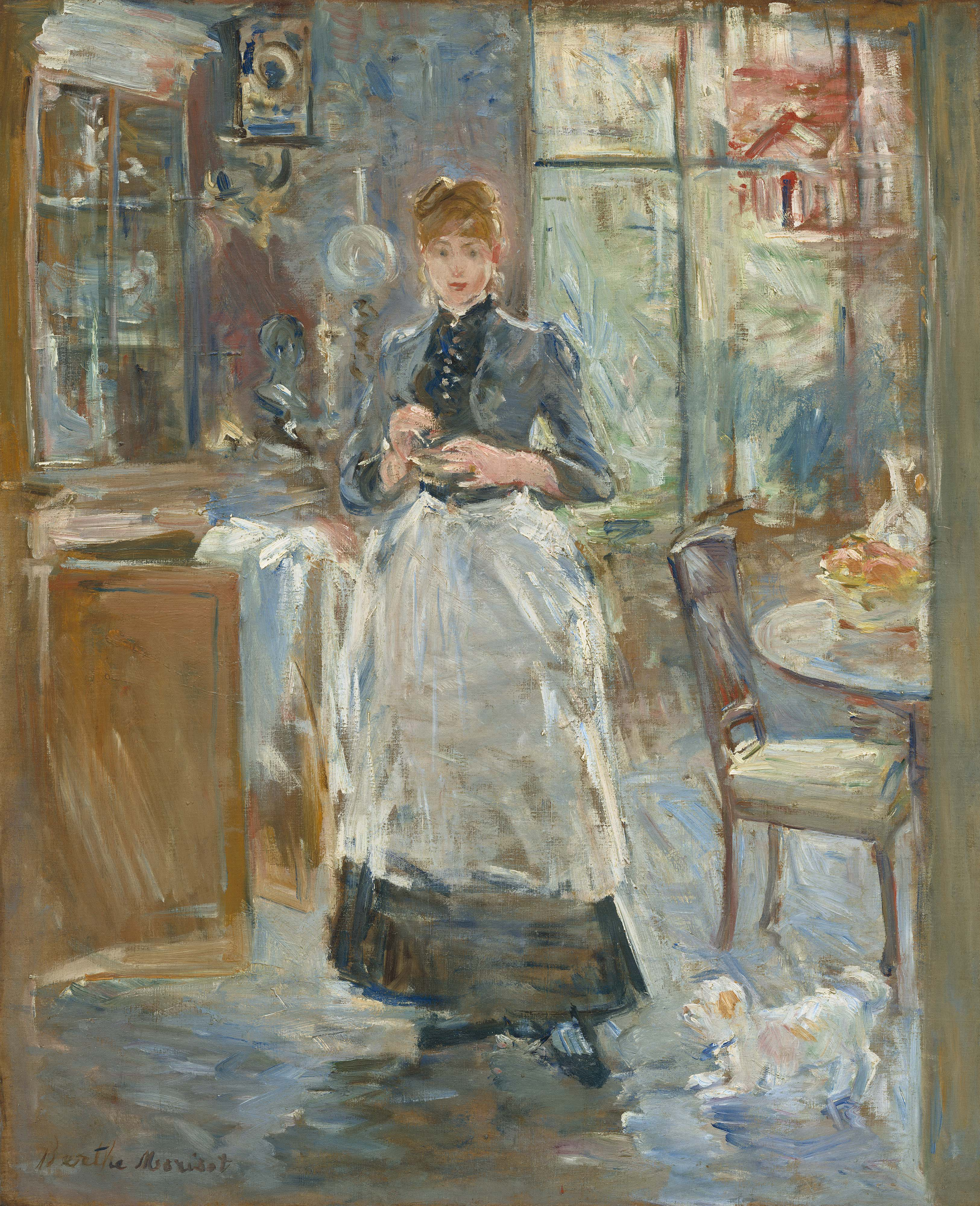
In the Dining Room (1886), National Gallery of Art Washington

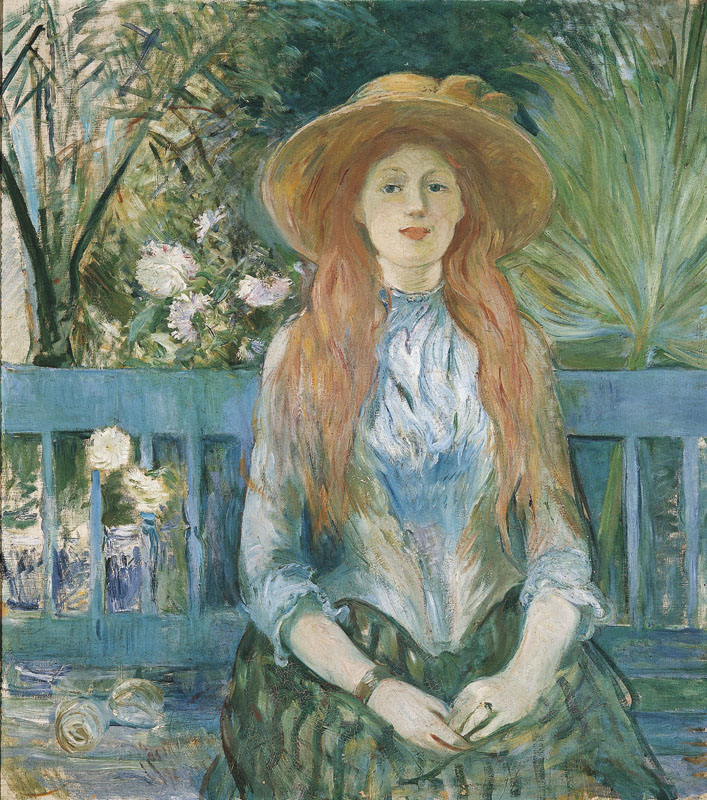
Young Girl in a Park (1888–1893), Musée des Augustins

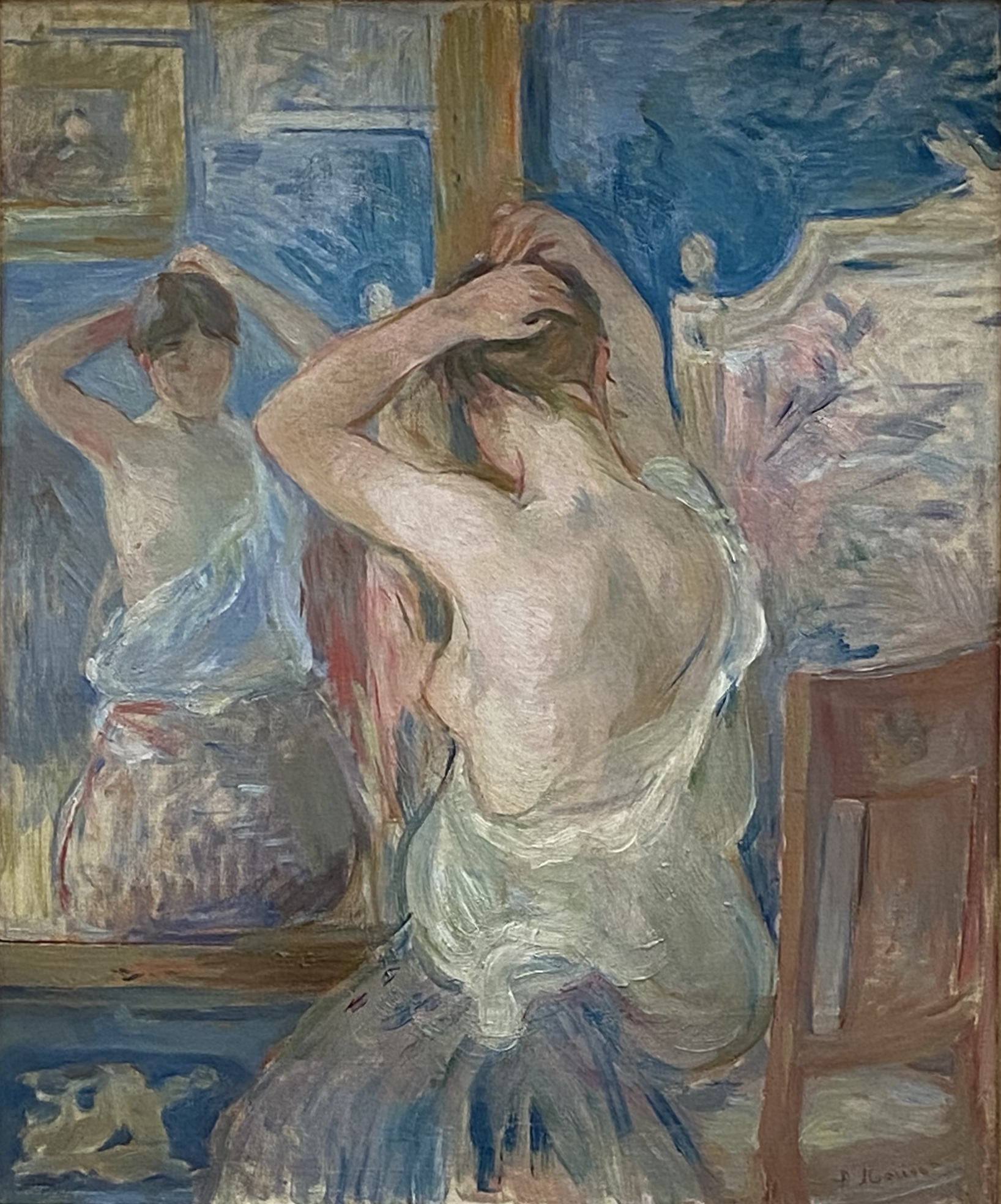
Before the Mirror (1890), Fondation Pierre Gianadda

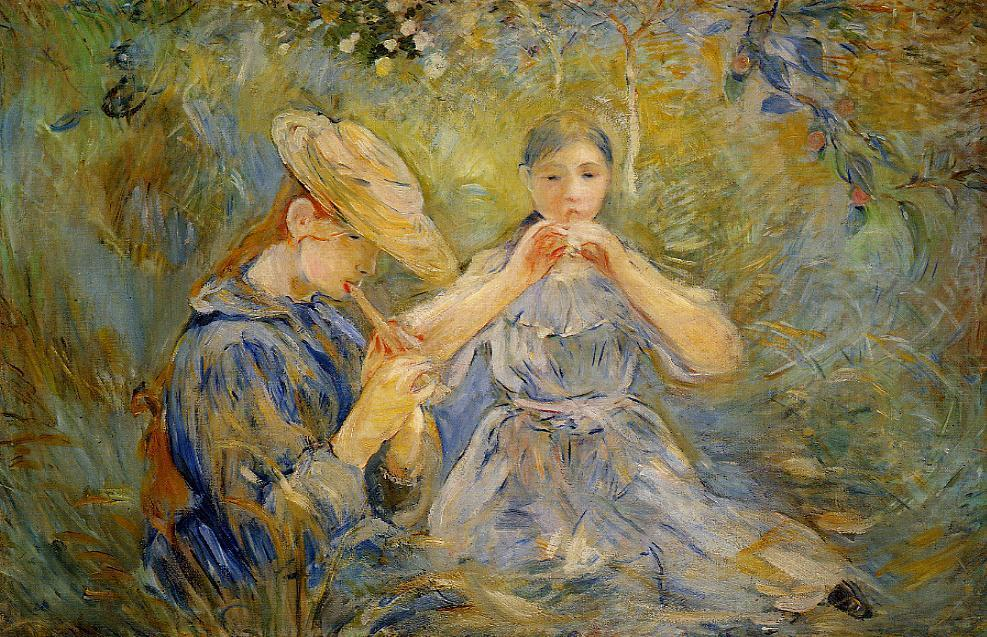
The Flute Player (1890), Arkansas Museum of Fine Arts

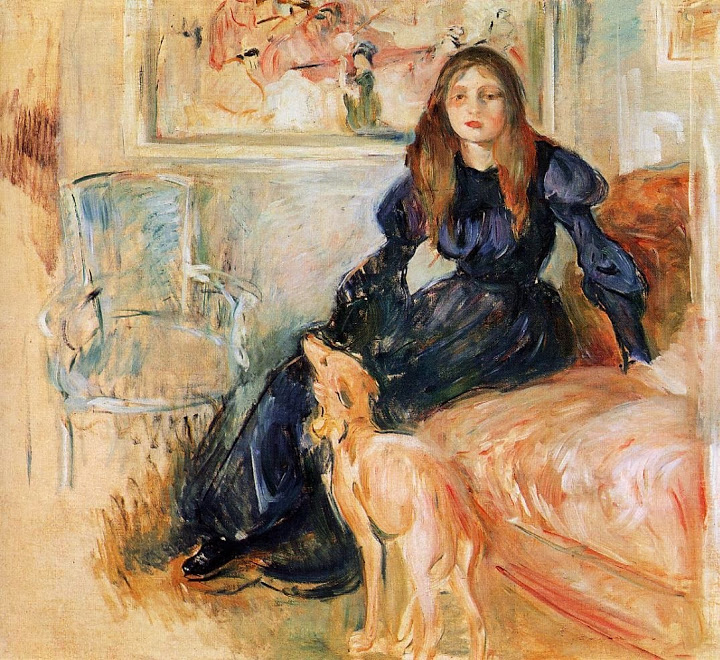
Julie Manet et son Lévrier Laerte (1893), Musée Marmottan Monet

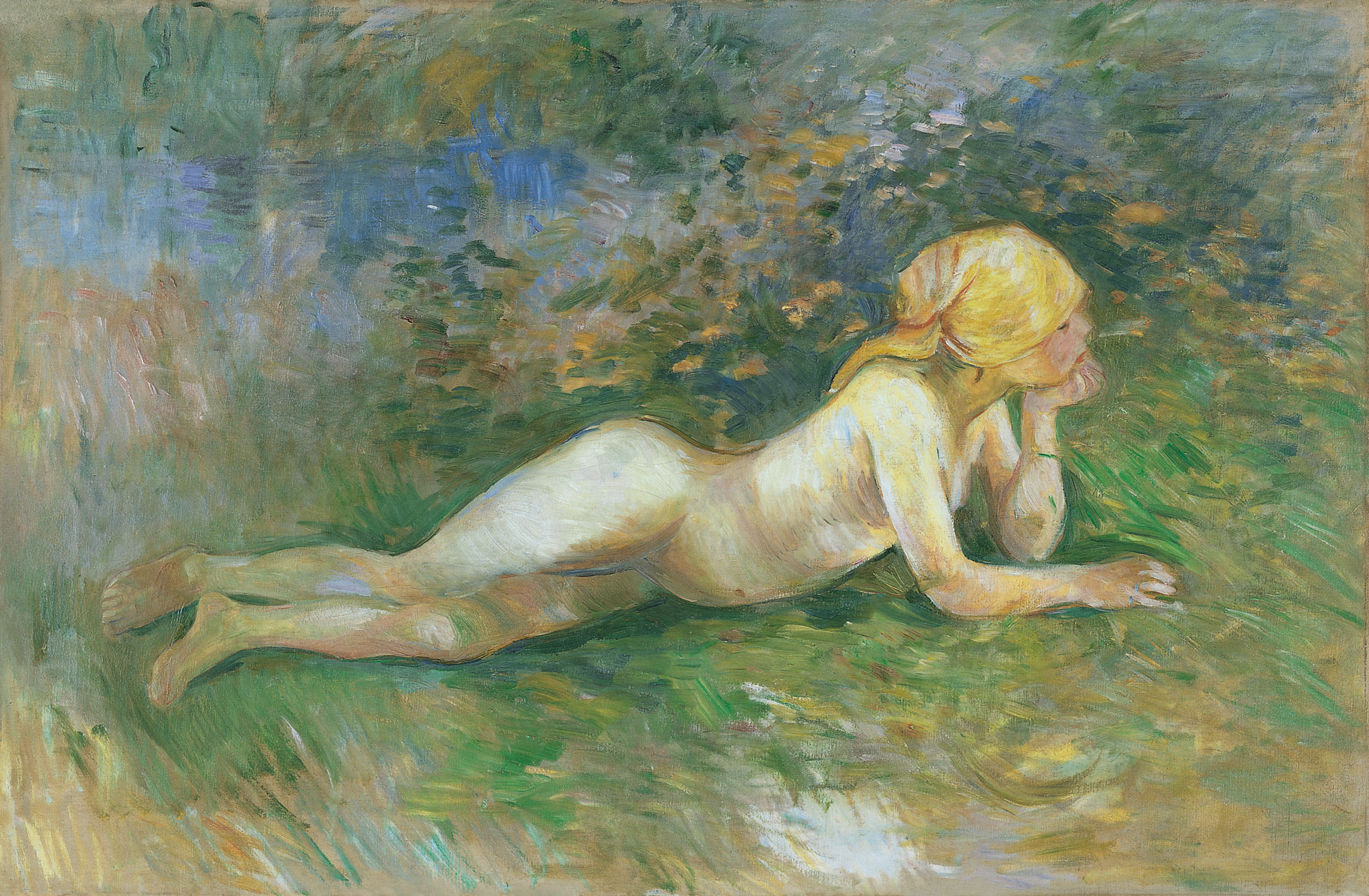
Bergère nue couchée (1891), Thyssen-Bornemisza Museum

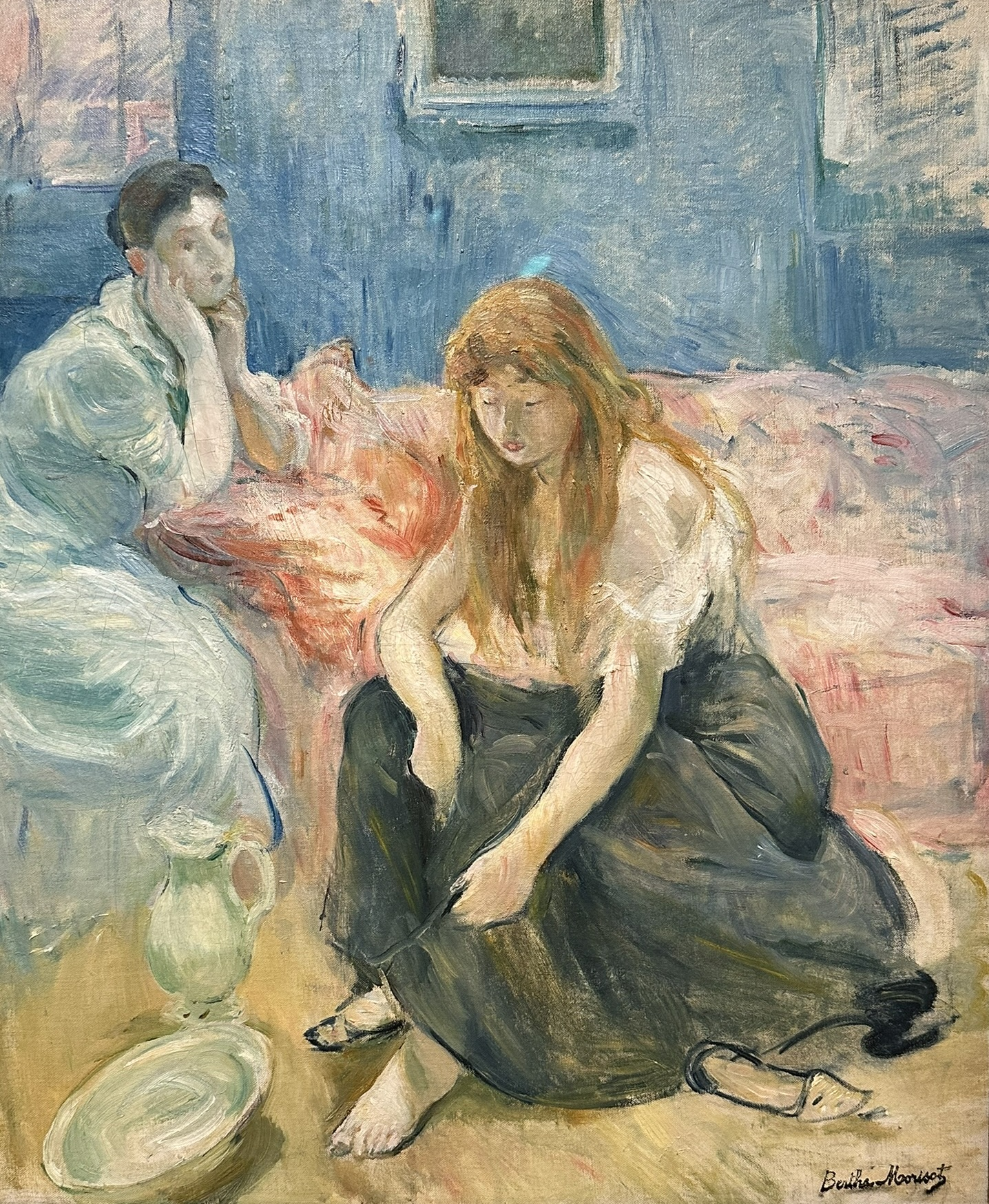
Two Girls (1894), The Phillips Collection

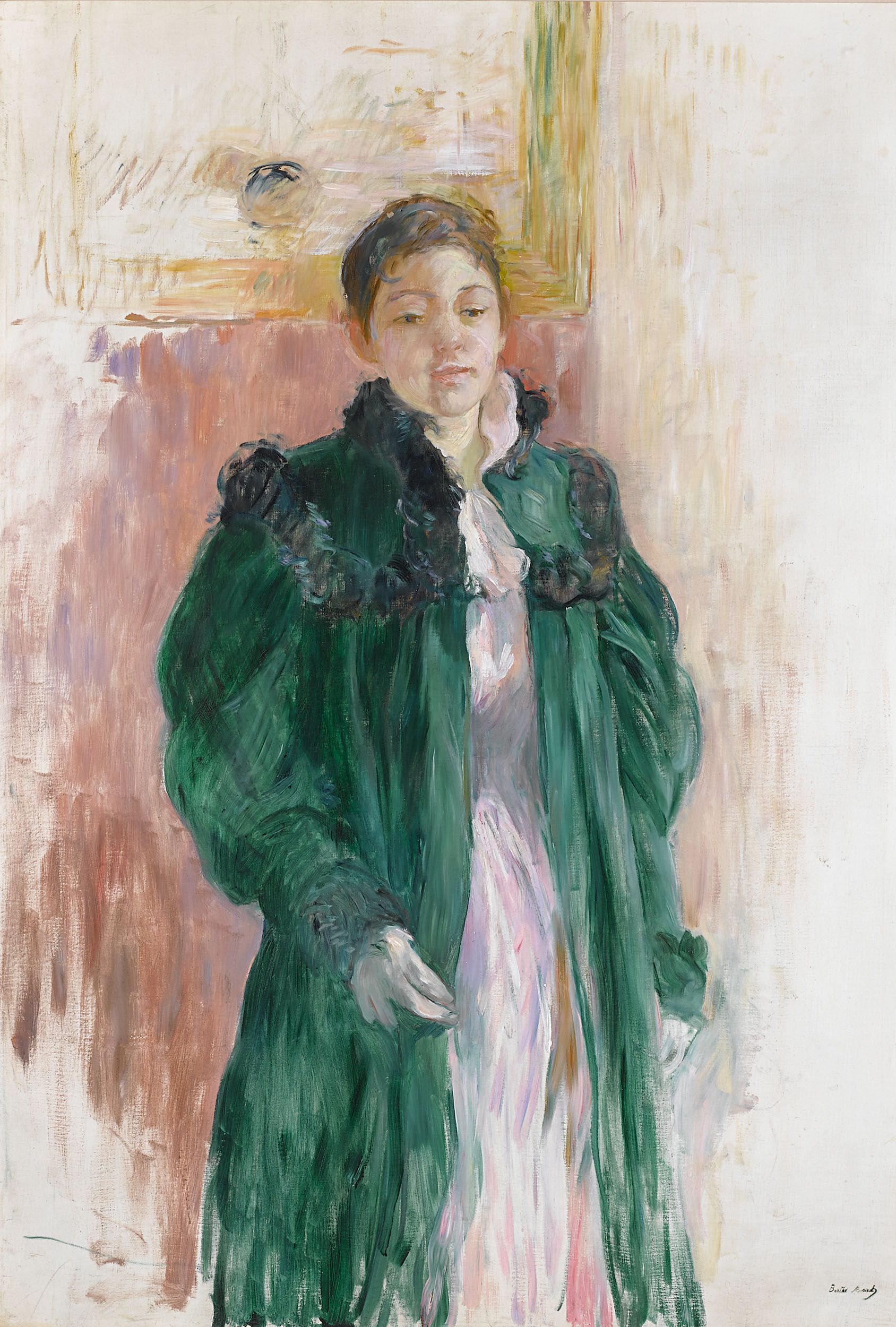
Jeune Fille au Manteau Vert, oil on canvas (c. 1894)

== Portraits of Morisot ==
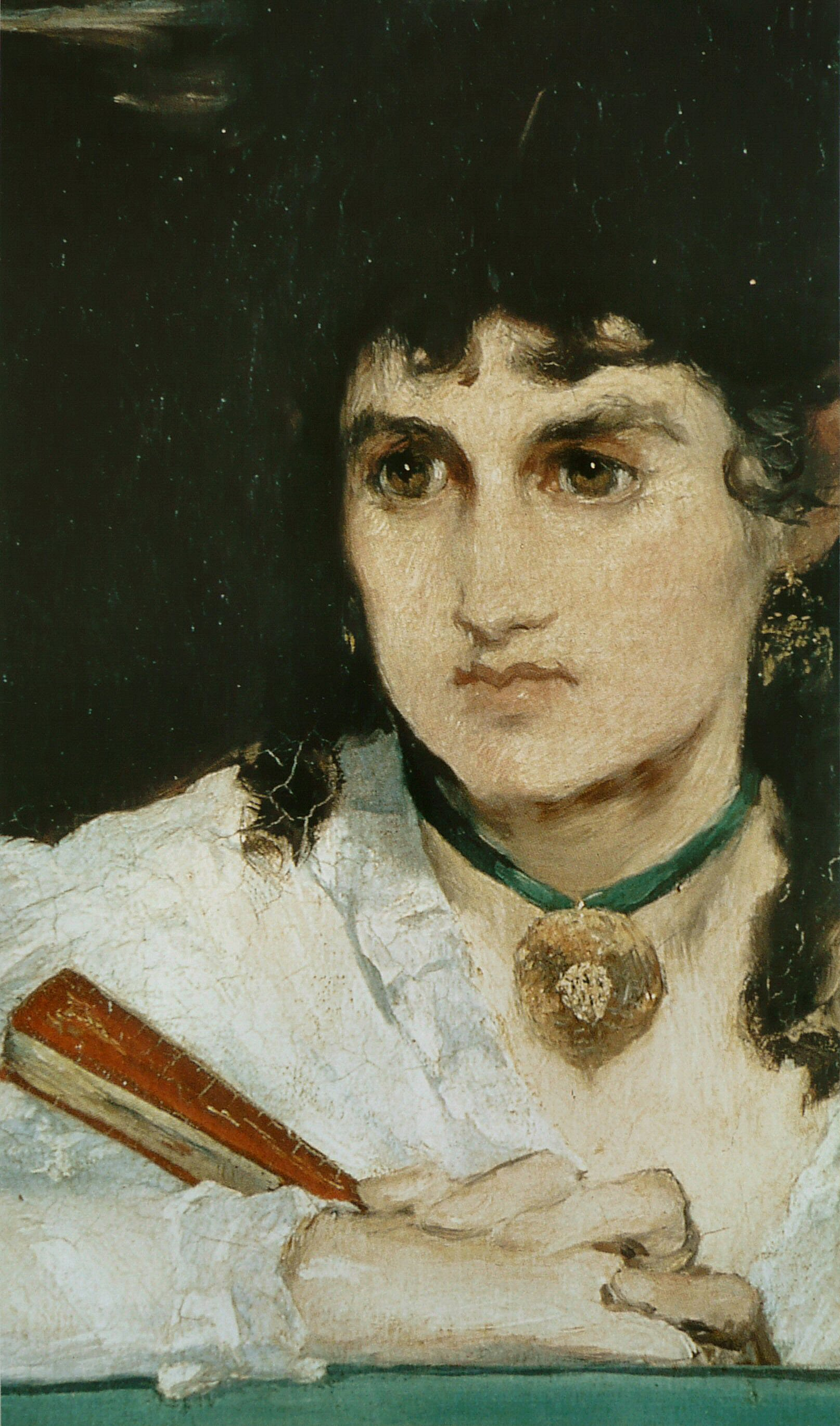
Detail from The Balcony (1868) – Édouard Manet, with the portrait of Berthe in the foreground

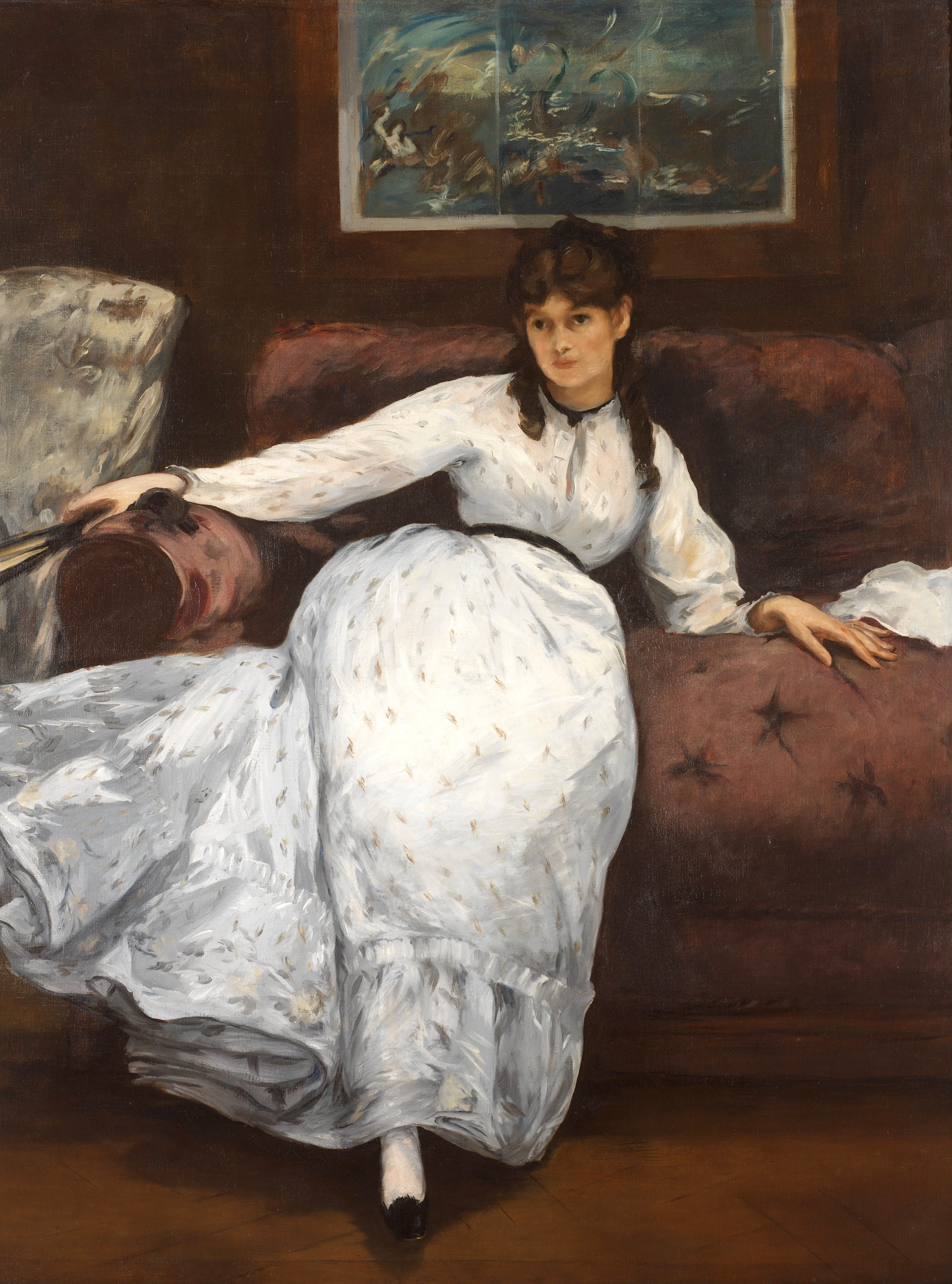
Berthe Morisot posing for The Rest (1870) – Édouard Manet

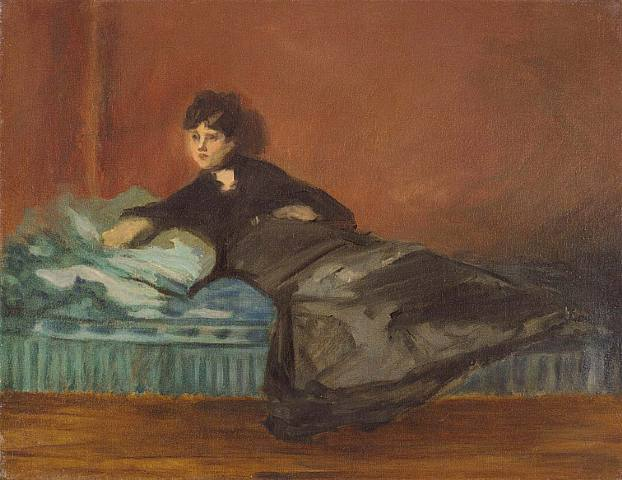
Berthe Morisot on a divan couch (1872) – Édouard Manet

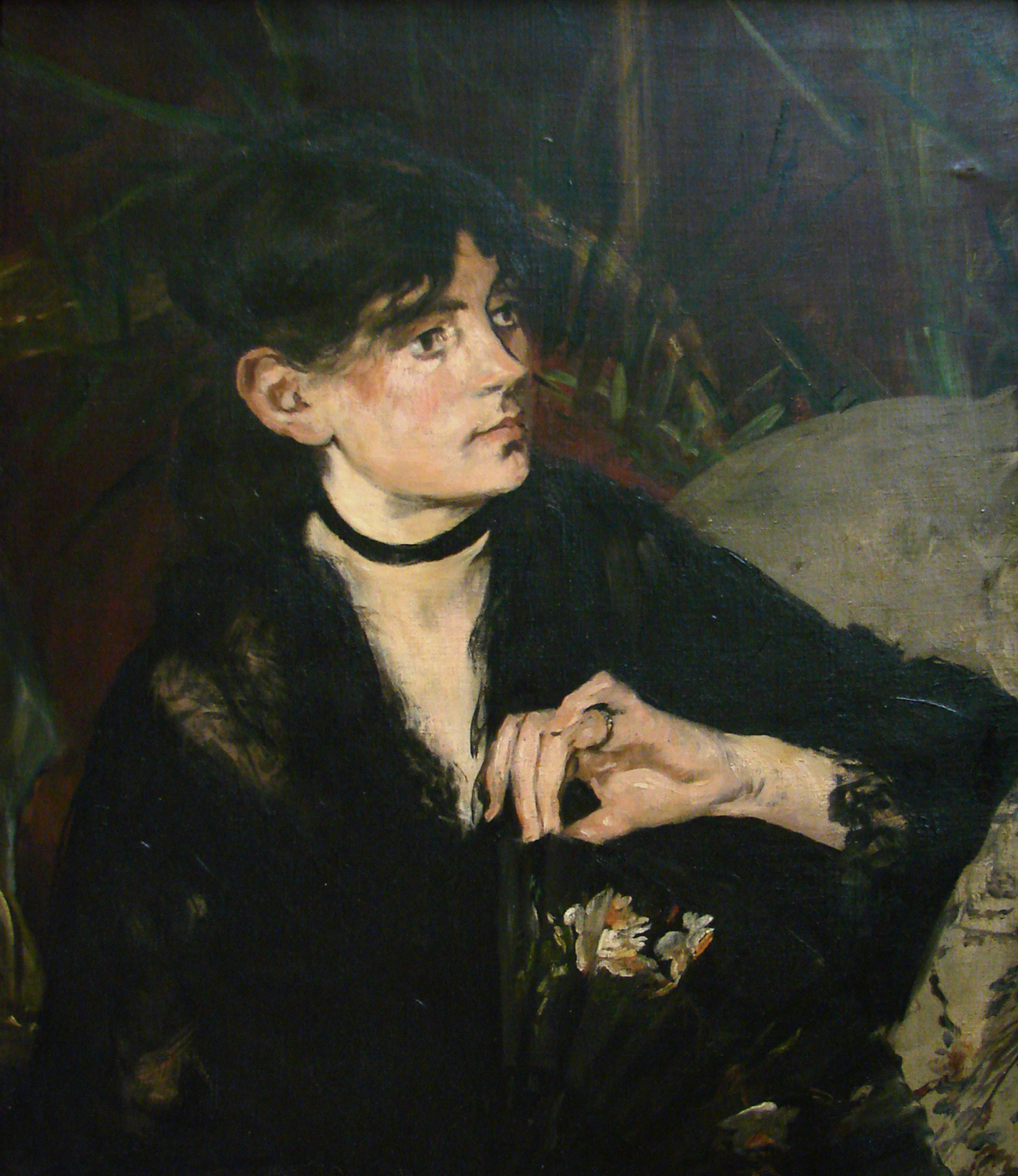
Portrait of Berthe Morisot with a Fan (1874) – Édouard Manet

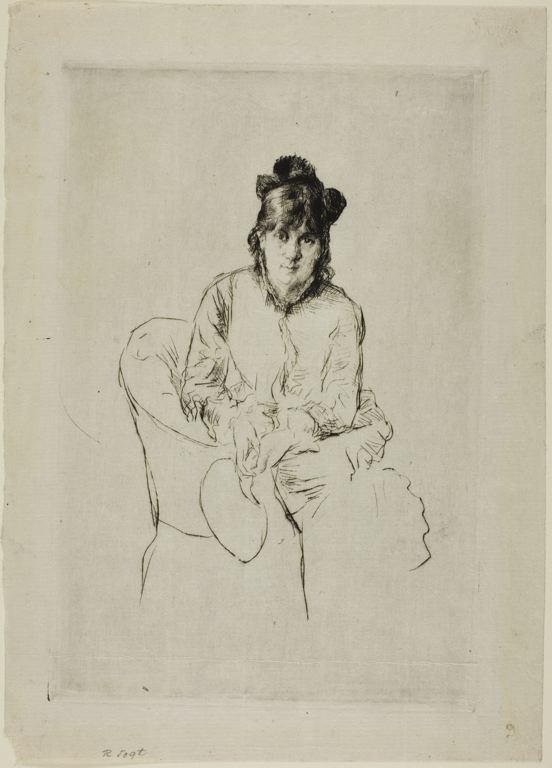
Portrait of Berthe Morisot (1876) – Marcellin Desboutin

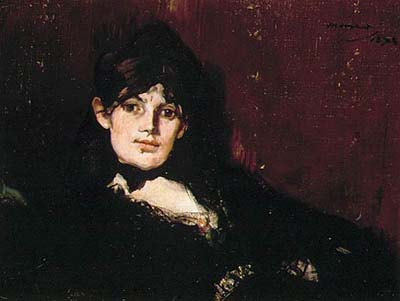
Portrait of Berthe Morisot (1882) – Édouard Manet

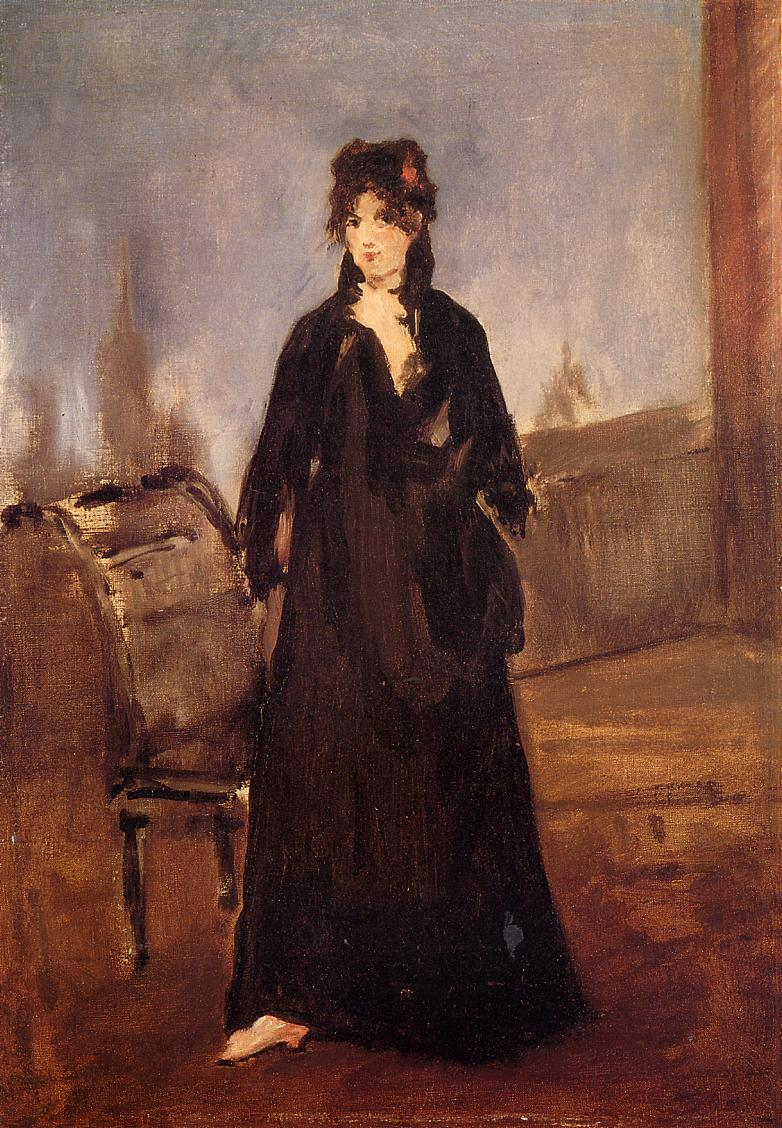
Berthe Morisot au soulier rose (1872) – Édouard Manet, Hiroshima Museum of Art

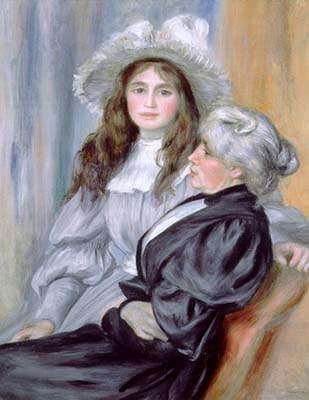
Berthe Morisot and her daughter Julie Manet (1894) – Pierre-Auguste Renoir

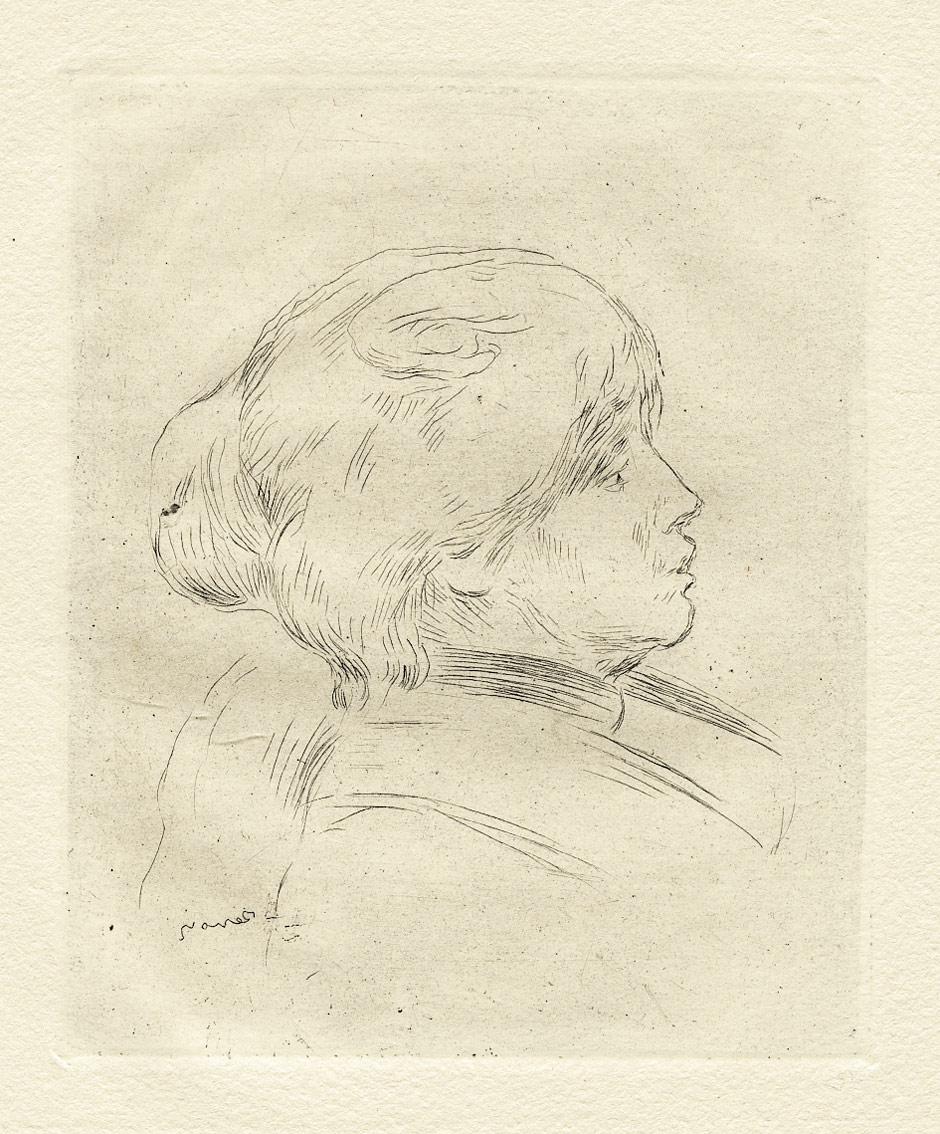
Berthe Morisot (1892) – Pierre-Auguste Renoir

== Art market ==
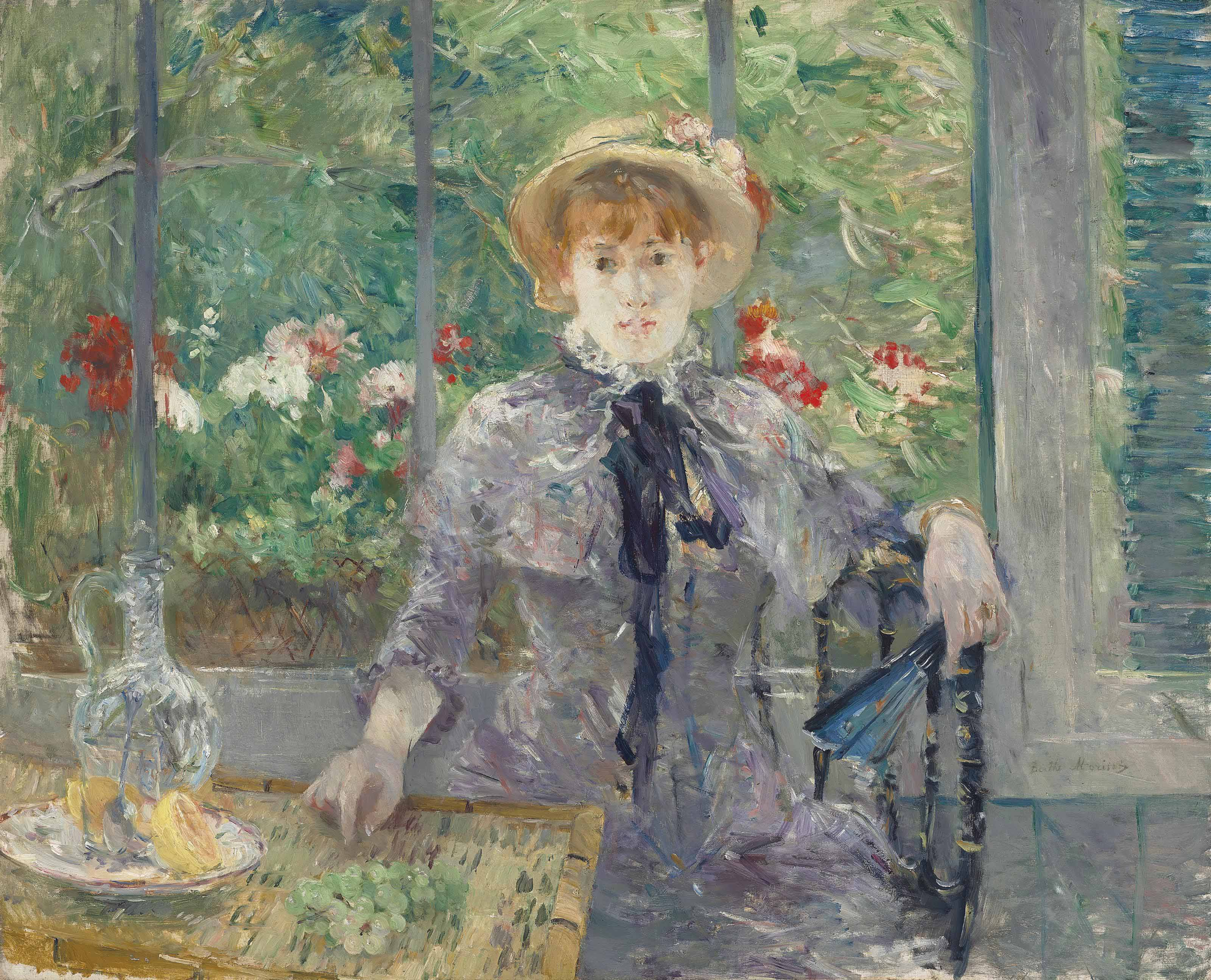
After Lunch (1881)

Morisot's work sold comparatively well. She achieved the two highest prices at a Hôtel Drouot auction in 1875, the Interior (Young Woman with Mirror) sold for 480 francs, and her pastel On the Lawn sold for 320 francs. Her works averaged 250 francs, the best relative prices at the auction.

In February 2013, Morisot became the highest priced female artist, when After Lunch (1881), a portrait of a young redhead in a straw hat and purple dress, sold for US$10.9 million at a Christie's auction. The painting achieved roughly three times its upper estimate, and it exceeded the 2012 record of US$10.7 million for a sculpture by Louise Bourgeois.

== Legacy ==
She was portrayed by actress Marine Delterme in a 2012 French biographical TV film directed by Caroline Champetier. The character of Beatrice de Clerval in Elizabeth Kostova's The Swan Thieves is largely based on Morisot.

From Melissa Burdick Harmon, an editor at Biography magazine, "While some of Morisot's work may seem to us today like sweet depictions of babies in cradles, at the time these images were considered extremely intimate, as objects related to infants belonged exclusively to the world of women."

In 2019, the Musée d'Orsay devoted a temporary exhibition to Berthe Morisot to pay tribute to her work.

In 2011, Morisot's great grandson Yves Rouart initiated a lawsuit against the Académie des Beaux-Arts concerning the disappearance of artworks, including one by Morisot herself, that had been owned by her grandson Denis Rouart and his wife Anne-Marie Rouart (née Conan) after they were discovered in the vault of the Wildenstein Institute.

== Exhibition ==
| Selected Berthe Morisot Solo Exhibitions | Date |
|---|---|
| Paris, Boussod, Valadon et Cie. Exposition de tableaux, pastels et dessins par Berthe Morisot. | 1892, 25 May – 18 June |
| Paris, Galerie Durand-Ruel. Berthe Morisot (Madame Eugene Manet): exposition de son œuvre. | 1896, 5–23 March |
| Paris, Galerie Durand-Ruel. Exposition Berthe Morisot. | 1902, 23 April – 10 May |
| Paris, Galerie E. Druet. Exposition Berthe Morisot. | 1905, January–February |
| Paris, Galerie Manzi-Joyant. Exposition Berthe Morisot. | 1912 |
| Paris. Galerie Manzi-Joyant. Exposition Berthe Morisot. | 1914, April |
| Paris, Galerie Bernheim-Jeune. Cent oeuvres de Berthe Morisot (1841–1895). | 1919, 7–22 November |
| Paris, Galerie Marcel Bernheim. Réunion d'oeuvres, par Berthe Morisot. | 1922, 20 June – 8 July |
| Chicago, Arts Club of Chicago. Exposition of Paintings by Berthe Morisot. 3 p. | 1925, 30 January – 10 March |
| London, Ernest Brown & Phillips, Leicester Galleries. Berthe Morisot Exhibition. | 1930, March–April |
| New York, Wildenstein Gallery. Berthe Morisot Exhibition. | 1936, 24 November – 12 December |
| Paris, Musée de l'Orangerie. Berthe Morisot, 1841–1895. | 1941, Summer |
| Paris, Galerie Weil. Berthe Morisot, retrospective. | 1947 |
| Copenhagen, Ny Carlsberg Glyptotek. Berthe Morisot, 1841–1895: Mälningar: Olja och Akvarellsamt Teckningar. | 1949, 20 August – 23 October |
| Boston, Museum of Fine Arts. Berthe Morisot: Drawings, Pastels, Watercolours. | 1960, 10 October – 10 December |
| Paris, Musée Jacquemart-André. Berthe Morisot. | 1961 |
| Paris, Galerie Hopkins-Thomas. Berthe Morisot. | 1987–88, April – 9 May |
| London, JPL Fine Arts. Berthe Morisot (1841–1895). | 1990–91, 7 November – 18 January |
| Paris, Galerie Hopkins-Thomas. Berthe Morisot. | 1993, 15 October – 30 November |
| Lille, Palais des Beaux-Arts, Berthe Morisot | 2002, 10 March – 9 June |
| Martigny, Fondation Pierre Gianadda, Berthe Morisot | 2002, 20 June – 9 November |
| Washington DC, National Museum of Women in the Arts, Berthe Morisot: An Impressionist and Her Circle. | 2005, 14 January – 8 May |
| Madrid, Thyssen-Bornemisza Museum, Berthe Morisot: The Woman impressionist. | 2012, 15 November – 12 February |
| Québec, Musée National des Beaux-arts du Québec, Berthe Morisot: Woman Impressionist. | 2018, 21 June – 23 September |
| Dallas, Dallas Museum of Art, Berthe Morisot, Woman Impressionist | 2019, 24 February – 26 May |
| London, Dulwich Picture Gallery, Berthe Morisot: Shaping Impressionism. | 2023, 31 March – 10 September |
| Genoa, Palazzo Ducale, Impression Morisot | 2024, 12–2 October – 2025, 23 February |
| Turin, GAM (Gallery Modern Art), Berthe Morisot. Pittrice impressionista | 2024, 16–2 October – 2025, 9 March |

== See also ==
- Women artists
- Western painting
- History of painting

== Sources ==
- Bataille, Marie-Louise; Wildenstein, Georges (1961). Berthe Morisot : Catalogue des peintures, pastels et aquarelles. Paris: Les Beaux-Arts. OCLC 490107208.
- Denvir, Bernard (1993). The Chronicle of Impressionism: An Intimate Diary of the Lives and World of the Great Artists. London: Thames & Hudson. OCLC 43339405
- Higonnet, Anne (1990). Berthe Morisot. New York: Harper & Row.
- Turner, Jane (2000). From Monet to Cézanne: Late 19th-century French Artists. Grove Art. New York: St. Martin's Press. ISBN 0-312-22971-2
- Manet, Julie, Rosalind de Boland Roberts, and Jane Roberts (1987). Growing Up with the Impressionists: The Diary of Julie Manet. London: Sotheby's Publications.
- Shennan, Margaret (1996). Berthe Morisot: The First Lady of Impressionism. Stroud: Sutton Publishing. ISBN 0-7509-2339-3
