= Young Girl in a Park =

Painting by Berthe Morisot

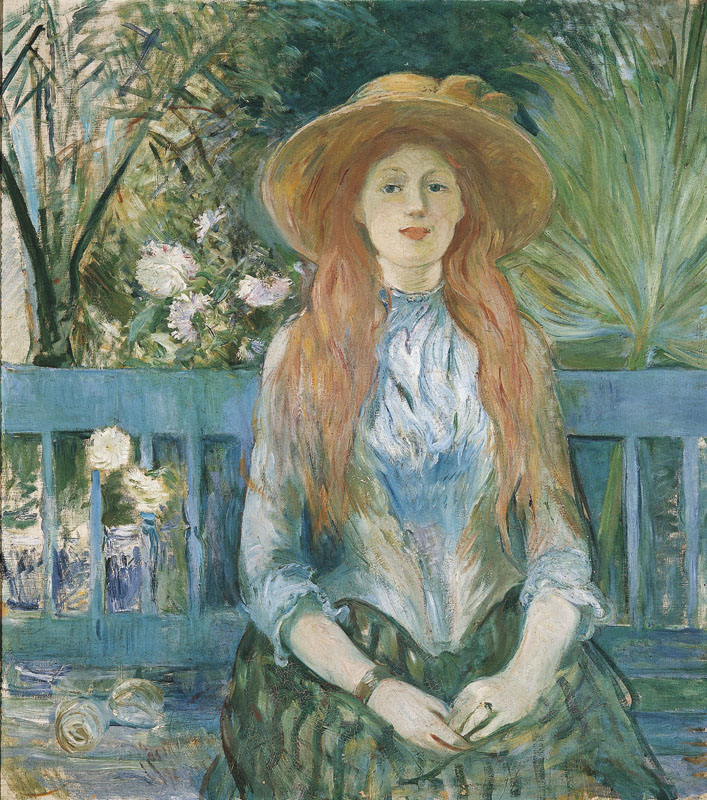
- Artist: Berthe Morisot
- Year: 1888–1893
- Medium: Oil on canvas
- Dimensions: 90 cm × 81 cm (35 in × 32 in)
- Location: Musée des Augustins, Toulouse

Young Girl in a Park is an oil-on-canvas painting by French artist Berthe Morisot, created between 1888 and 1893. It has the dimensions of 90 by 81 cm. It is held at the Musée des Augustins in Toulouse.

== History and description ==
This canvas, in an almost square format, is a portrait of a young girl named Jeanne-Marie, who also would pose for Julie Manet, the artist's daughter. Morisot began this work in 1888 but quickly abandoned it. She waited until 1893 to return to it and complete it, two years before she died. In 1892, on the occasion of her personal exhibition, the work was not finished and couldn't be shown to the public. The model of the work can be found in several works by Berthe Morisot, including Young Girl Leaning (1887) and Young Woman with a Hat (1888). Jeanne-Marie began posing for this painting in 1888, but in 1893, when Morisot resumed work on it, she was no longer available. The artist decided to continue the work despite the absence of a model, drawing inspiration from her daughter, which explains the slightly fixed appearance of the young girl's face.

The young girl faces us, monumentalized by a frontal position. She is seated on a bench, in the foreground of the work, slightly off center to the right. The frame cuts it through her legs. She is surrounded by a lush garden and wears a large English hat in beige tones. Her wavy red hair falls over her shoulders framing a soft, fixed face, on which a smile is sketched. The curves drawn by the vegetation echo those of her body, underlined by the clothing, as well as the roundness of the hat and the undulation of her hair. Only the vertical and horizontal lines of the bench interrupt this intertwining of soft lines.

The top of her garment, mixing shades of blue, white, green and gray, recalls the color of the bench and the flowers to the girl's right. The bottom of her dress, striped with shades of green, recalls the different tones of the vegetation in the background. The light beige of the girl's skin and the darker beige of the hat echo the golden light found at the top left of the canvas, where the vegetation is less abundant.

== Analysis ==
Morisot develops a painting where the forms dissolve to suggest impressions, an atmosphere linked to the model and the place represented. In this work, it is not only the face of the young girl, her features and her physical particularities that interest Morisot, but also her attitude and the impression she gives. The bust of the young girl is very straight, her pose is restrained, with her hands resting on her thighs, and her gaze remains fixed: the whole portrait seems to reflect a certain uneasiness in the young girl, sitting alone on the bench.

This impression of unease is contrasted, however, with a soft, spring-like light, the harmonious shades and tones and the smile sketched on the young girl's lips. Berthe Morisot suggests an impression of movement in the vegetation and in the model's hair, as if a light wind was crossing the garden. The harmony and the softness of the landscape produce a peaceful atmosphere which attenuates the stiffness of the young girl.

The work, by its date of creation and by the aesthetics that develops there – an aesthetics of impression and sensations, of movement and of nature, an aesthetics where forms dissolve, where the touch is broad and where colors and light have a more important role than line and drawing belongs to the current of Impressionism which developed in the last quarter of the 19th century. Morisot was part of this artistic current, alongside artists like Édouard Manet, Edgar Degas and Pierre-Auguste Renoir, with whom she maintained an important artistic relationship.

== Exhibitions and provenance ==
This painting was exhibited for the first time in 1896, during a posthumous exhibition of the artist, under the title On the Bench, with the dates of "1888-1893". Her daughter, Julie Manet, and her husband Ernest Rouart, a watercolor painter, both heirs to the artist's work, lend Young Girl in a Park to the “Libre Esthétique” exhibition in Brussels, Belgium, from February 25 to March 29, 1904, a retrospective on impressionist painting, where the critics gave Berthe Morisot her rightful place, alongside the greatest artists of the late 19th century. Juliet Manet and Ernest Rouart donated the painting to the Musée des Augustins, in Toulouse, in 1905.

The work has since been kept in the Salon Rouge of the Musée des Augustins in Toulouse, a room that brings together 19th and early 20th century art in France.
