= Paule Gobillard =

French painter

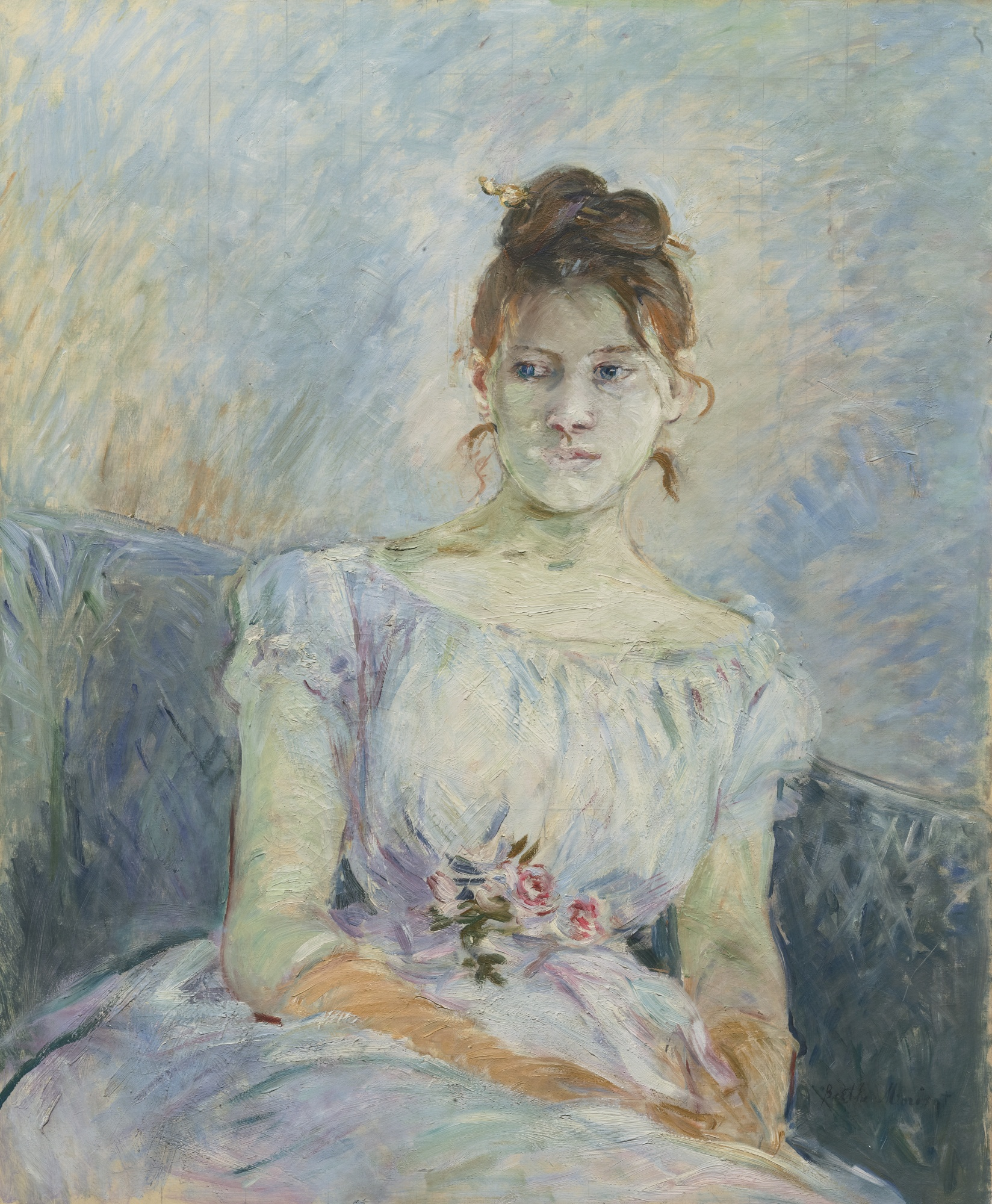
- Berthe Morisot, Paule Gobillard en robe de bal, 1887
- Born: Paule Gobillard; December 3, 1867; Quimperlé, Brittany, France
- Died: 27 February 1946 (aged 78); Paris, France
- Education: Berthe Morisot
- Known for: Painting
- Movement: Post-Impressionism

Paule Gobillard (3 December 1867 – 27 February 1946) was a French artist and Post-Impressionist painter who was heavily influenced by the Impressionists. She is the niece of Berthe Morisot and Eugène Manet, the brother of Édouard Manet, who taught her lessons in painting as part of her education upon being orphaned at an early age. She was unknown in the art scene compared to her relatives. She exhibited with the Société des Indépendants in 1904 and in 1926.

== Life and works ==
The few details on Gobillard's personal life that are extant are largely based on the memoirs of her cousin Julie Manet. She was born in the town of Quimperlé, on the southern coast of Brittany. She was the eldest daughter of Théodore Gobillard (1833–1879) and Yves Morisot (1838–1893), who was the sister of Berthe Morisot, noted female Impressionist painter, and a direct descendant of Jean-Honoré Fragonard, a Rococo painter of the Ancien Régime. She had two siblings, Marcel and Jeanne. Throughout her childhood, Gobillard was the student and frequent model of her aunt and she is featured in at least ten of Morisot's paintings, including Paule Gobillard En Robe De Bal.

At the age of 26, Gobillard stood orphaned along with her siblings as their mother died in 1893 and resided with her aunt, Berthe in Paris. During their stay with her aunt, she and her sister Jeanne stood initially as models for her paintings. Favored by her aunt as a model in her works, Berthe taught her painting. Impressed by her Impressionistic tutelage, she painted the everyday life of children, women and the outdoors with the tenderness of light pastels notably in the depiction in her still-lifes of flowers in their vases.

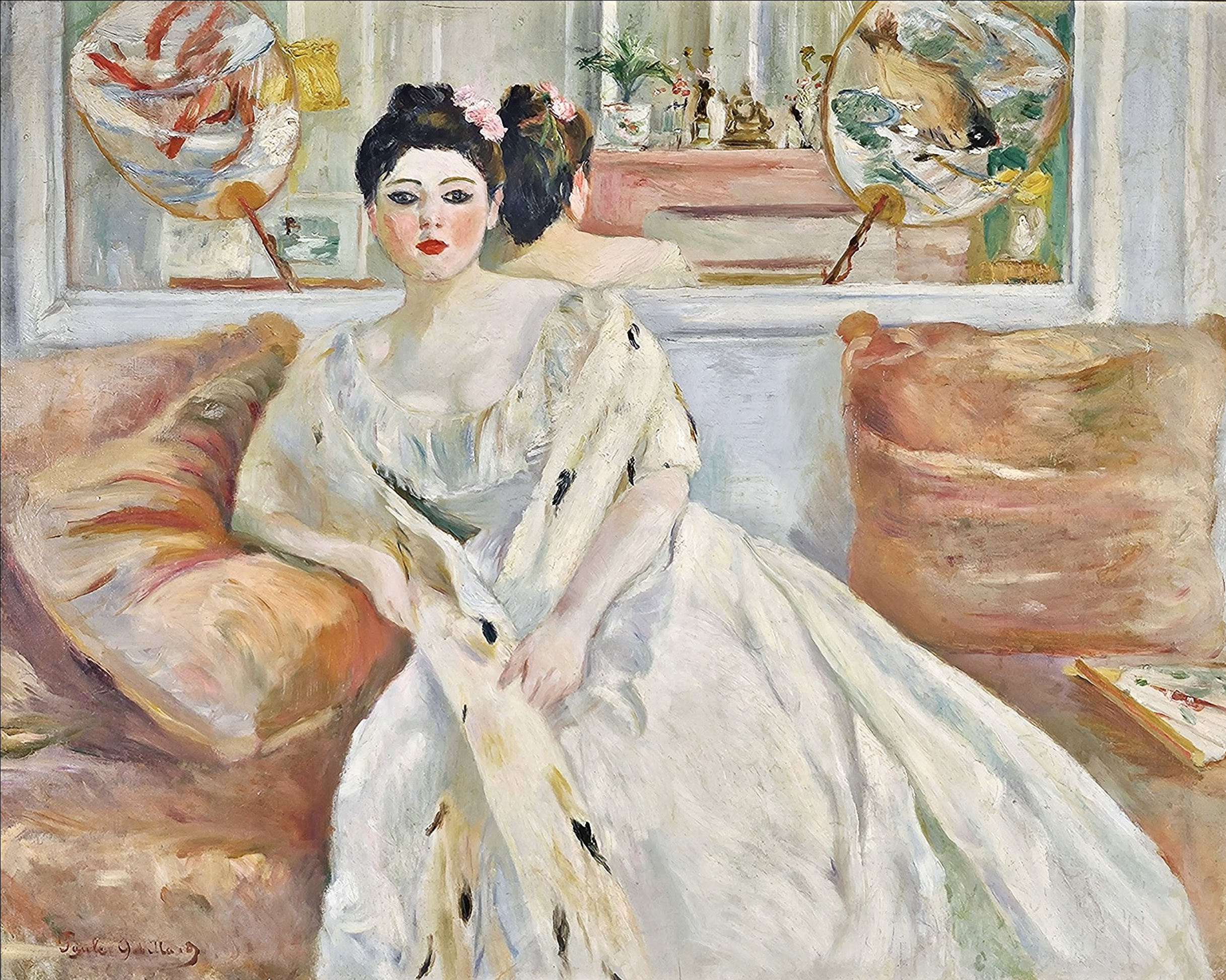
La femme à la robe blanche, effet de miroir

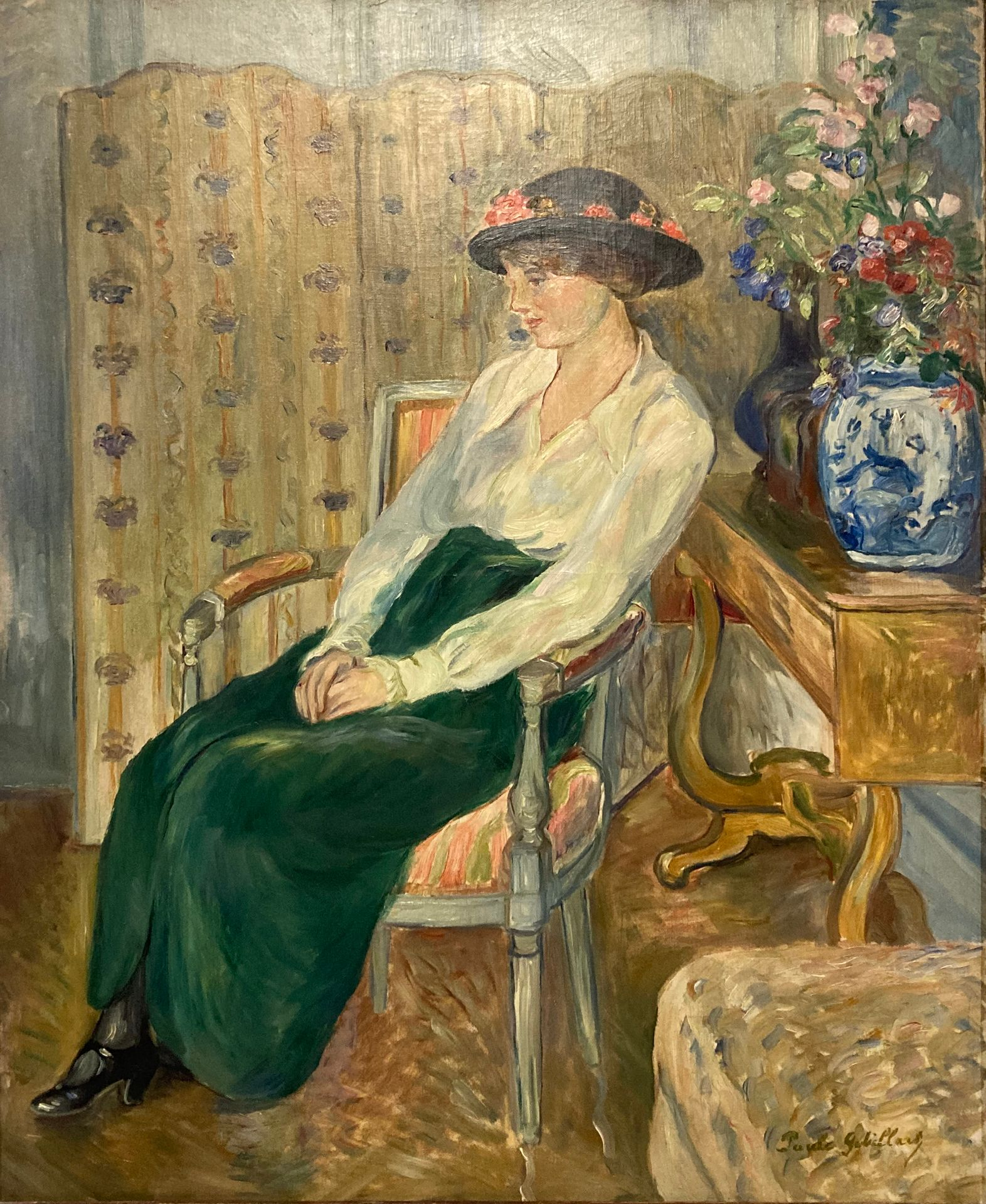
La Femme au chapeau

She also drew upon the color hues from her other mentor, Pierre-Auguste Renoir who brought sensuality to the style of Impressionism. Renoir would often implore the Gobillard sisters to pose for him as models and teach them on the side, painting during his encounters in the southern coast of France, notably in Brittany. During this period, she also served as a model in several of close friend Edgar Degas' photographs. In 1894, she held her first exhibition of her works and was subsequently exhibited with other prominent artists during that period at the Société des Indépendants. In 1900, Paule’s sister married Paul Valéry, a French poet and essayist. After this union, Paule resided with the couple in Morisot's home, where she produced some of her most well-known work. She went on to further exhibit two other works at the Salon d'Automne in 1904 and then twelve works at Le Salon des Tuileries in 1926. Gobillard continued painting and lived until 1946, when she died in Paris.

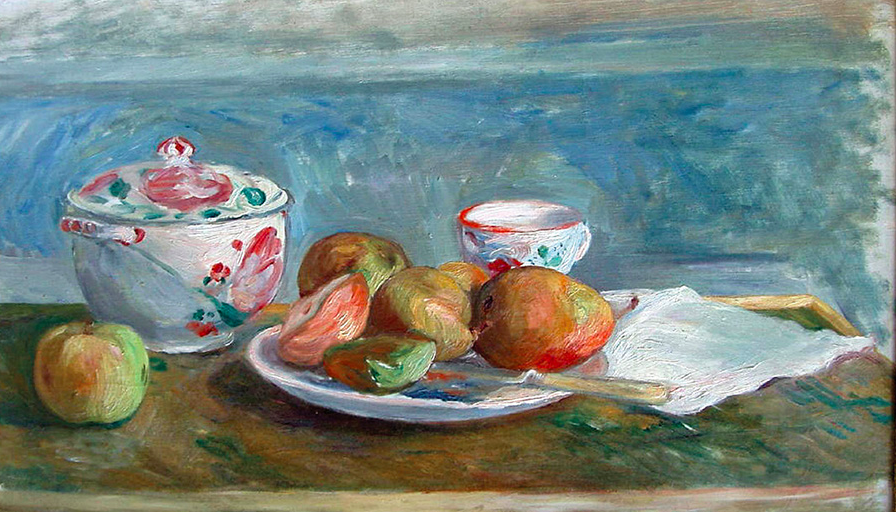
Gobillard oil on canvas, 24 x 15 inches

== Legacy ==
In 1983, then-Philippine First Lady Imelda Marcos reportedly bought fifty-two paintings of Gobillard for US$273,000 (US$640,141.14 in 2013 dollars) from the Hammer Galleries, a New York-based art gallery as part of her extravagant overseas spending sprees during her husband's political reign. The paintings are presently being litigated by the Presidential Commission on Good Government.

On 30 June 2004, more than 100 of her paintings and drawings from the collection of her nephew, François Valéry were auctioned by the Parisian auction house Calmels–Cohen.

== Exhibitions ==
- Paule Gobillard (1869-1946), Galerie Scot, Paris, France, 23 September - 31 October 1999.
