= Eugène Manet on the Isle of Wight =

Painting by Berthe Morisot

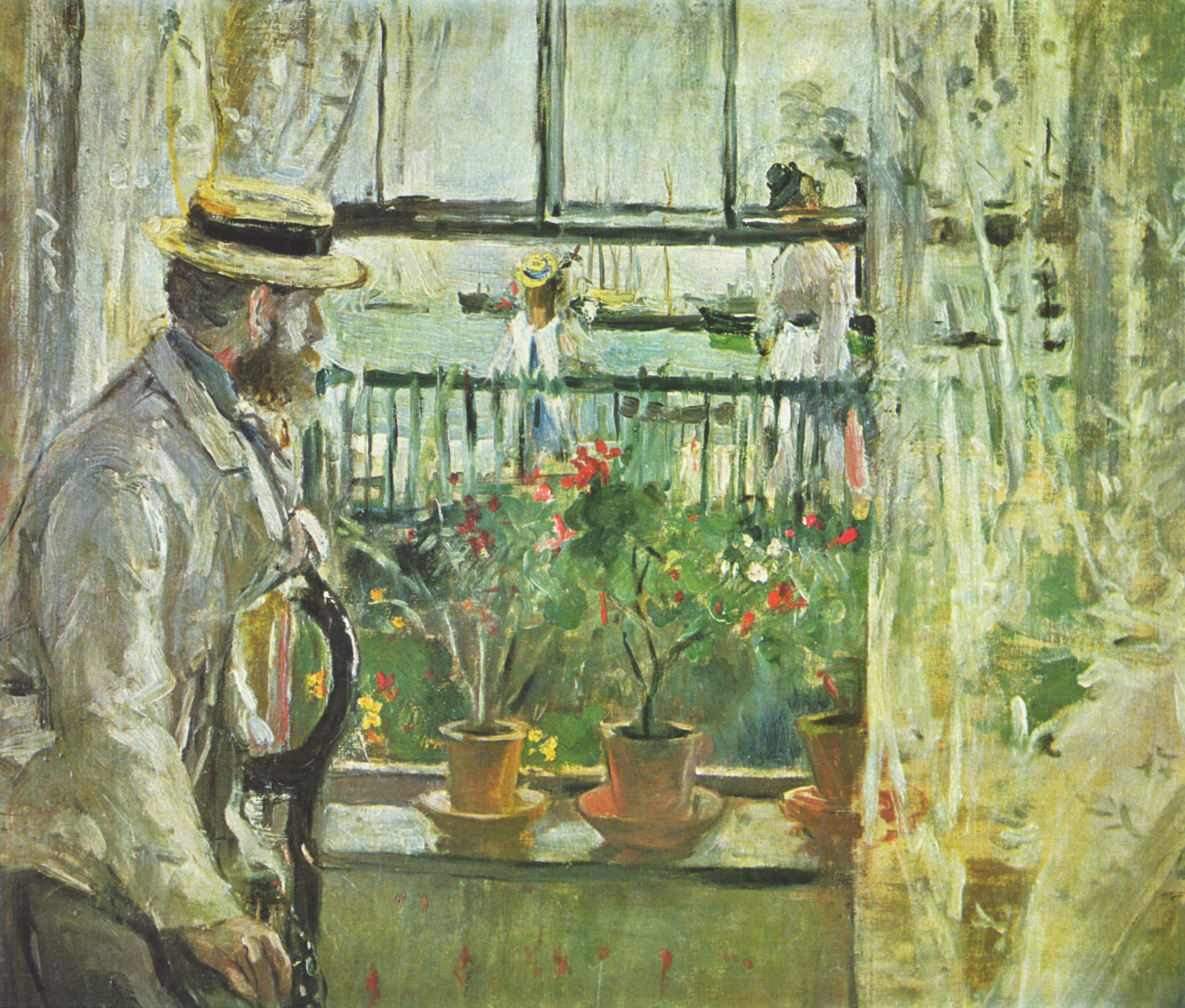
- Artist: Berthe Morisot
- Year: 1875
- Medium: oil on canvas
- Dimensions: 38.1 cm × 46 cm (15.0 in × 18 in)
- Location: Musée Marmottan Monet, Paris

Eugène Manet on the Isle of Wight is an oil-on-canvas painting by French artist Berthe Morisot. The painting depicts a man, Eugène Manet, relaxing at a hotel window, with vases visible on the parapet. Manet is looking out the window as two elegantly dressed women in white pass by. Several boats appear at the shoreline.

The painting dates from the period just after Morisot married Eugène Manet, brother of the painter Édouard Manet, in December 1874. It was created during their honeymoon the following year, when they spent some time at Cowes, a town in the north of the Isle of Wight.

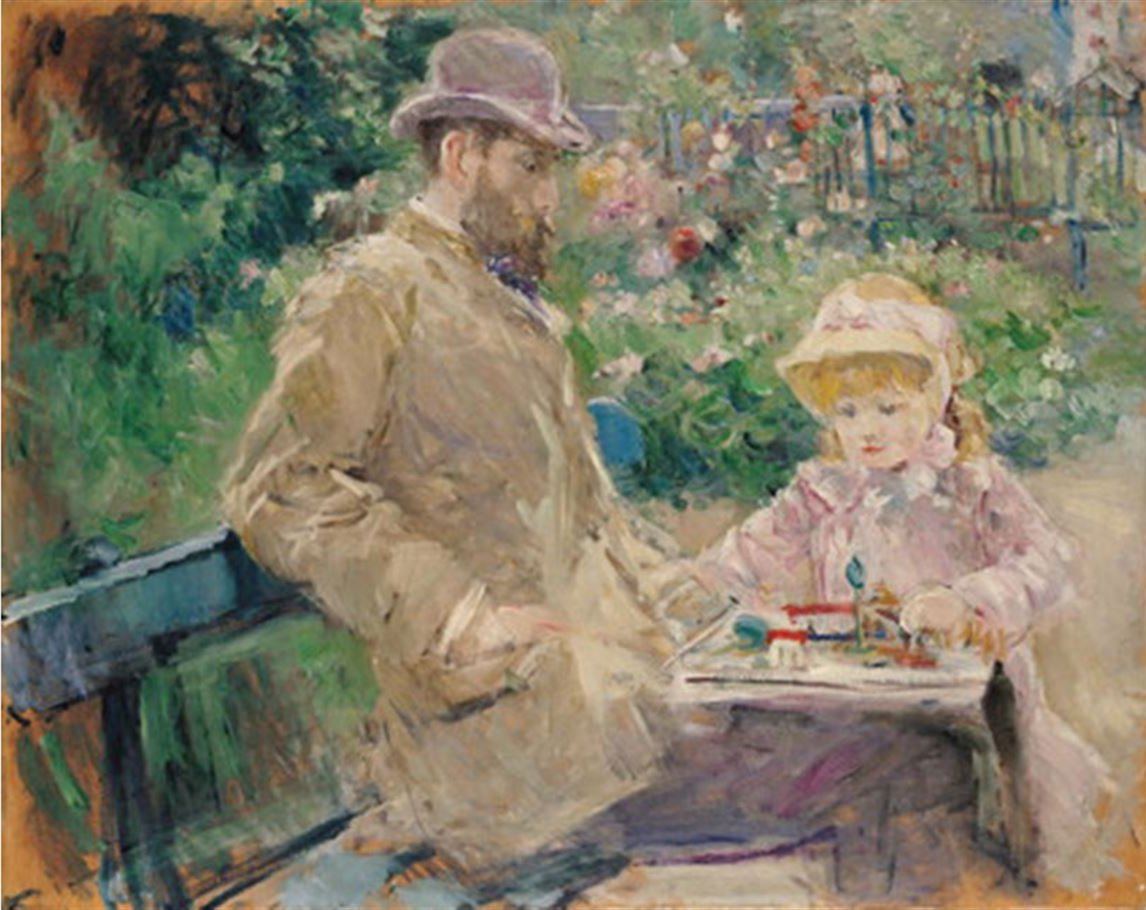
Eugène Manet and His Daughter at Bougival, 1881

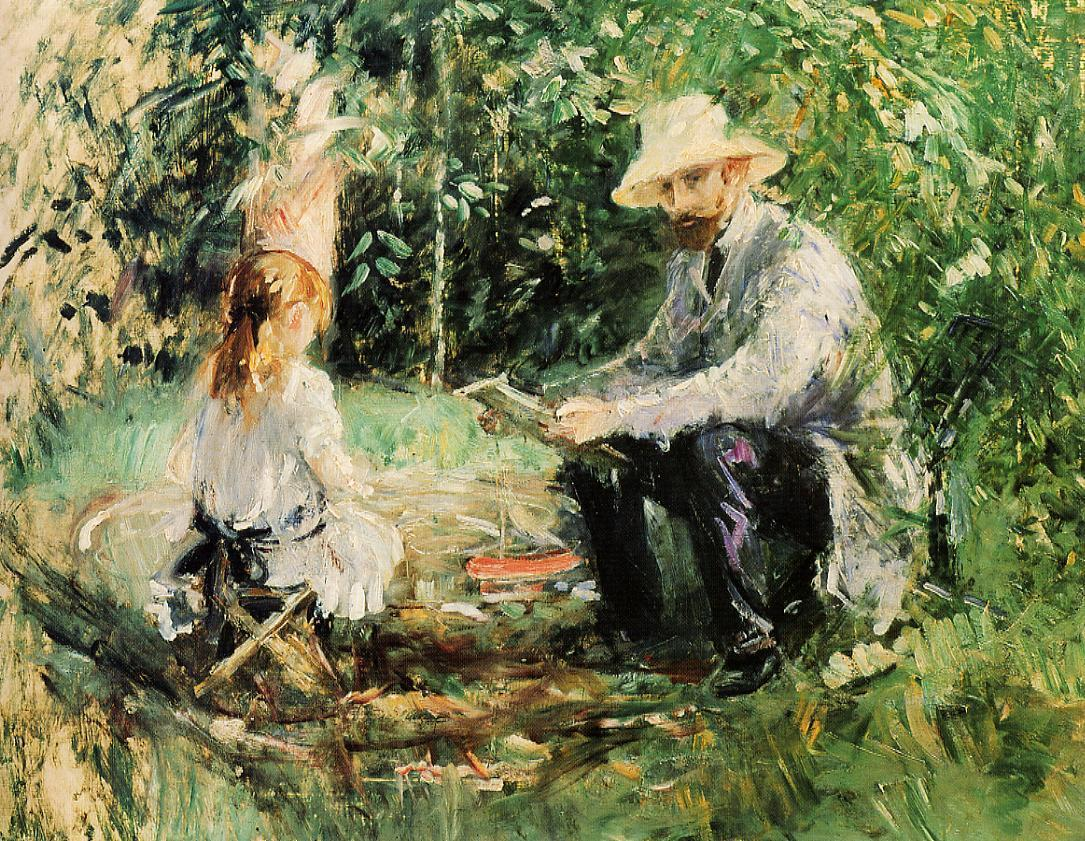
Berthe Morisot, Eugène Manet and His Daughter in the Garden, 1883.

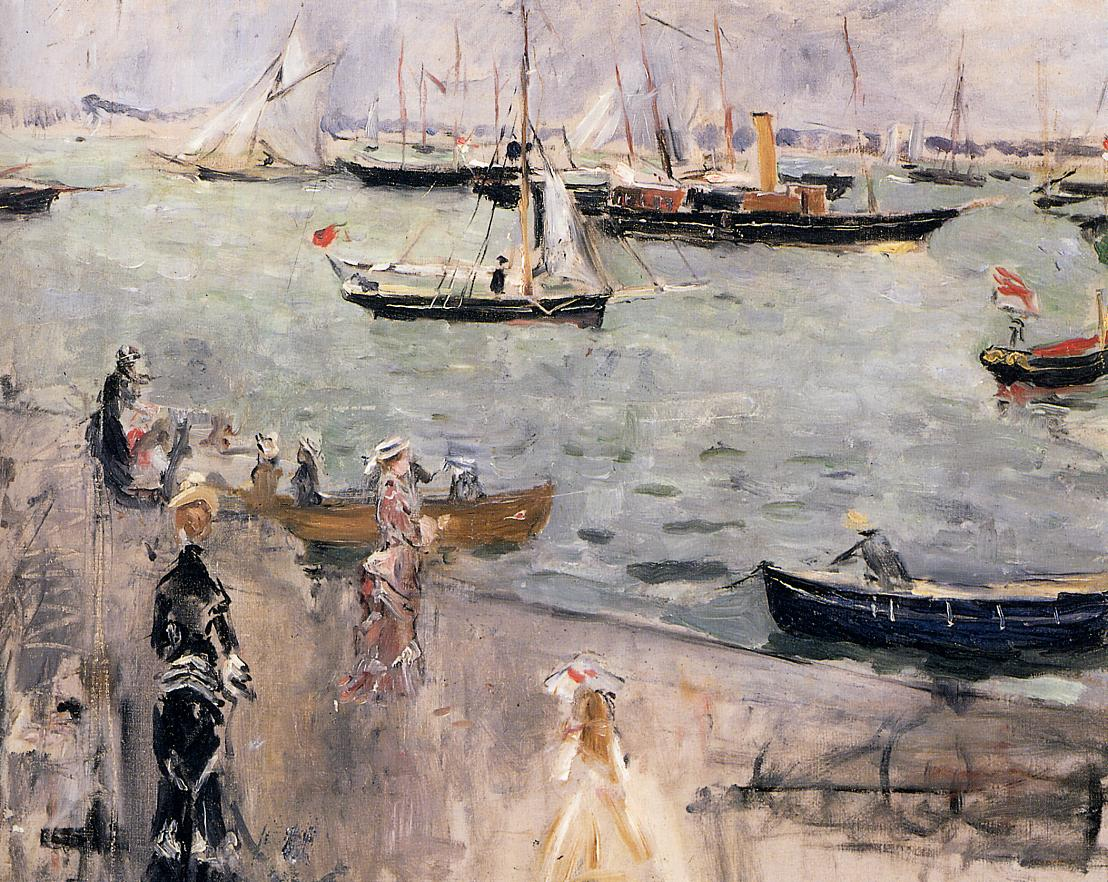
The Isle of Wight, 1875

The 38 by 46 centimeter painting is in the collection of the Musée Marmottan Monet, in Paris.

== Analysis ==
Eugène Manet on the Isle of Wight is an Impressionist depiction of everyday life on an English Island. We see a man looking at an ordinary scene of women walking and boats in a harbor. The loose brushstrokes and the realistic light are typical of Impressionism. Some scholars have interpreted Morisot's decision to paint from the privacy of the interior, hidden by a shear curtain, as a sign of the constraints imposed on women by the gender norms of the era.

== Relationship with the Manet brothers ==
'Morisot met other French Impressionist painter, Édouard Manet, in 1868 while she was a copyist in the Louvre. They quickly became close friends and colleagues, inspiring each other's works. Édouard Manet introduced Morisot to his brother, Eugène Manet and they were married in 1874. In 1875 the two traveled to the Isle of Wight for their honeymoon where Morisot painted this first painting of her husband.

Eugène Manet was her muse in two other paintings later in their marriage, Eugène Manet and His Daughter at Bougival, 1881 and Eugène Manet and His Daughter in the Garden, 1883. Manet was not only a model for Morisot and her husband but an intellectual companion as he was also passionate about art.

== Related works ==
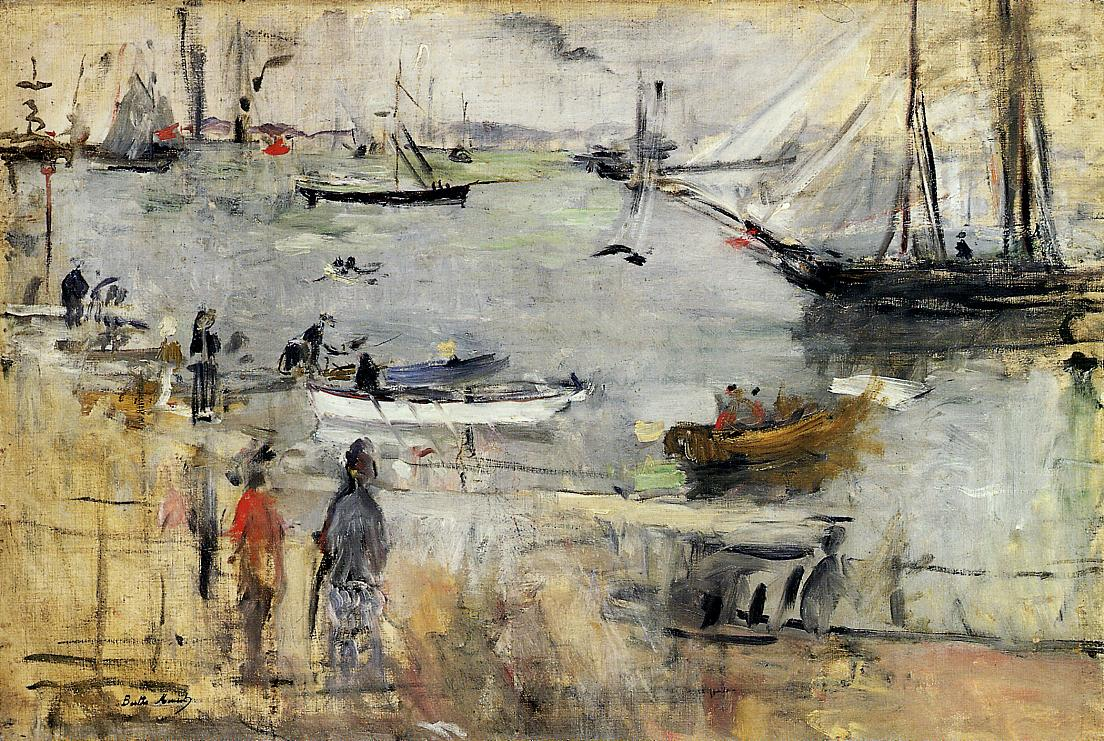
English Seascape, 1875

While on her honeymoon Morisot created other paintings that may have served as studies for different elements of this painting. Morisot painted The Isle of Wight, 1875 which depicts the scene outside of the window of this painting. Here we see women in large dresses walking along the path by the shore and boats along the docks of the port. English Seascape, 1875 is a painting from the same vantage point as The Isle of Wight, with looser brush strokes.

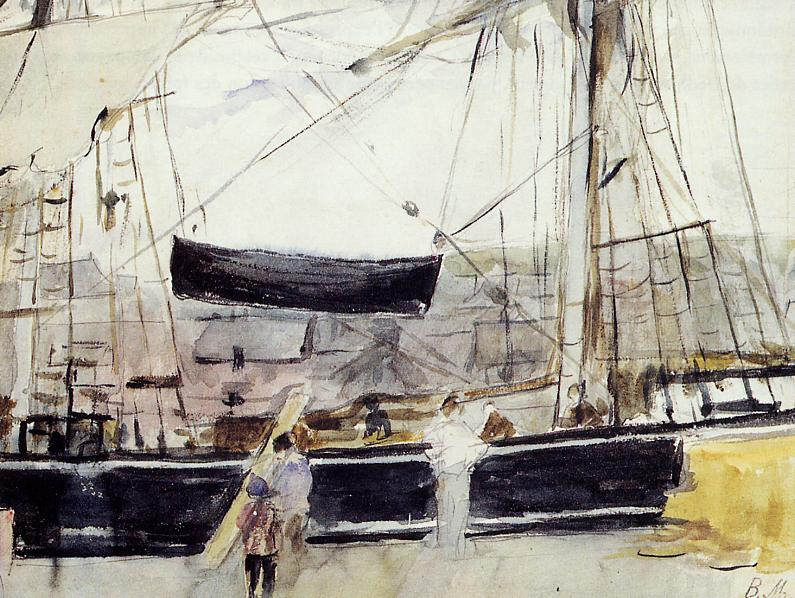
Boats on the Quay, 1875

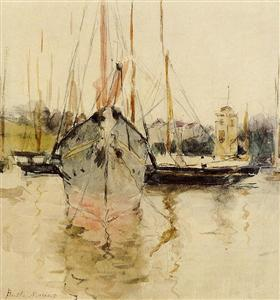
Boats - Entry to the Medina in the Isle of Wight, 1875

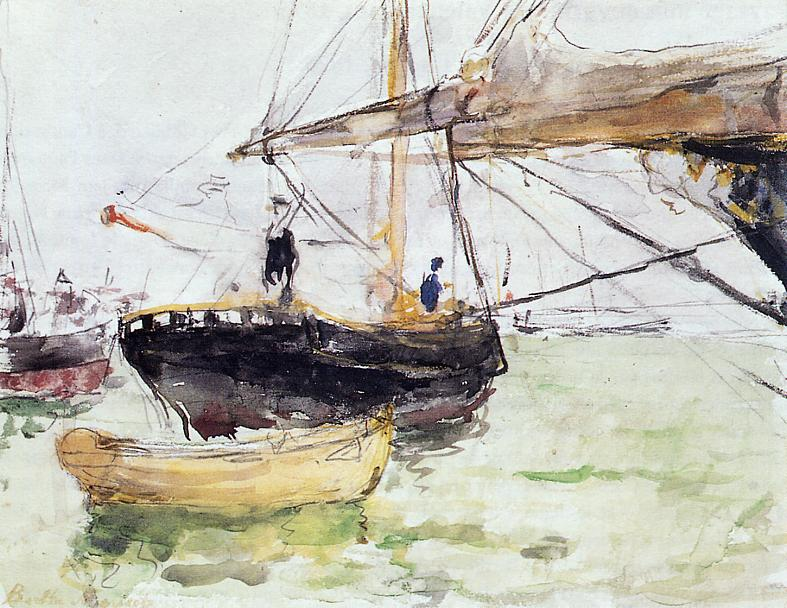
Aboard a Yacht, 1875

Other paintings from this trip focus on the boats in the harbor. Boats on the Quay, 1875 is a painting of a single docked boat from a similar vantage point, also showing people walking along the shore. Boats - Entry to the Medina in the Isle of Wight, 1875 and Aboard a Yacht, 1875 are the last two paintings from this location. Both of these pieces depict a more close up image of boats on the sea; here we have fully lost the shoreline in the foreground and the wide scale of many other boats in the port.

== Relation to Impressionism ==
Morisot was a major figure in Impressionism, but women faced obstacles that impacted their choice of subject matter. Most notably, women were less free to explore public space, so their paintings were typically done in private settings.

Eugène Manet on the Isle of Wight suggests Morisot's restrained choice of location in showing the port and the streets of the island from the point of view of someone looking out a window. Manet is not confined to this space as a man but for Morisot to be able to paint him in a socially acceptable way it must be in the confines of the private space of their hotel.
