= In a Park =

Painting by Berthe Morisot

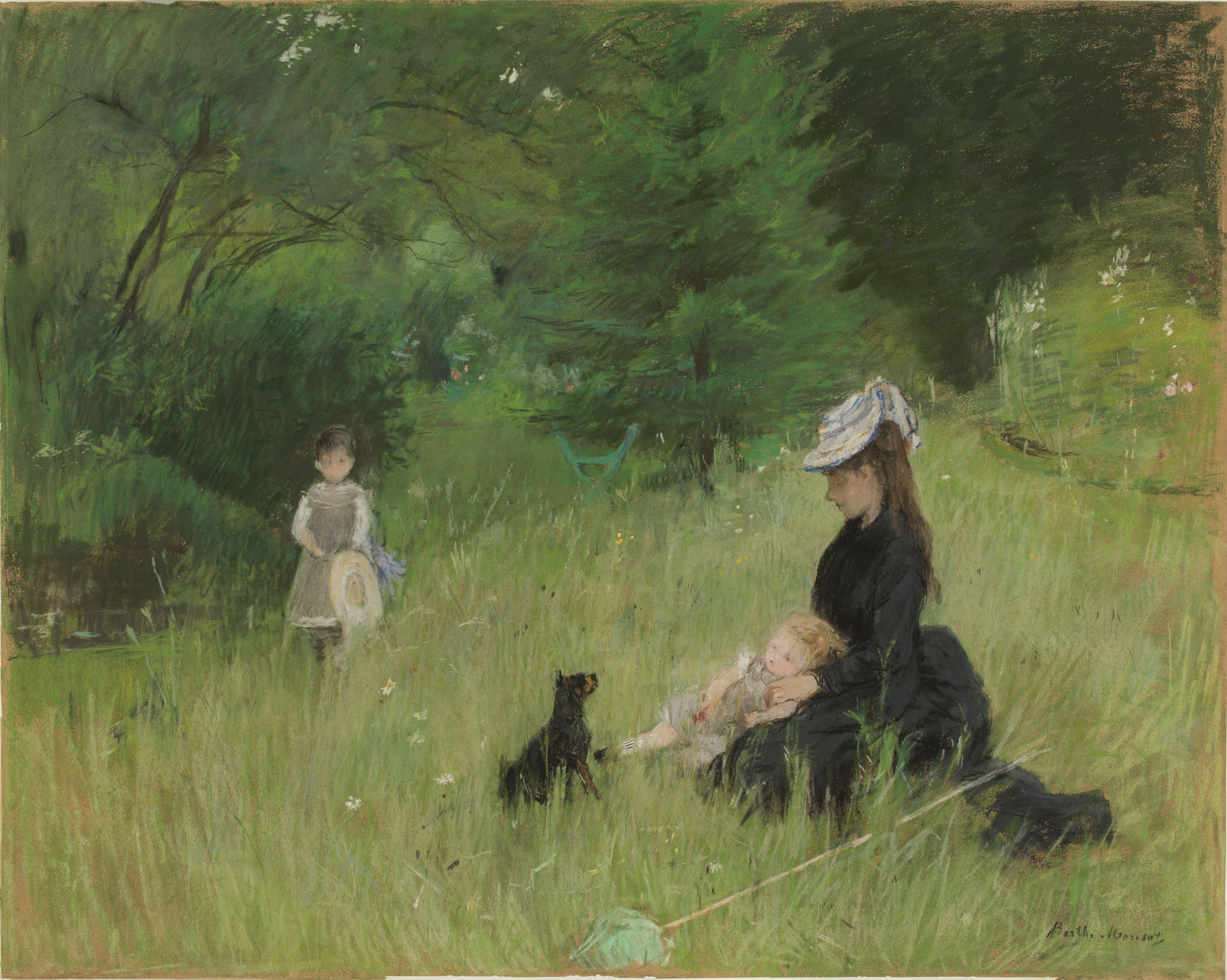
- Artist: Berthe Morisot
- Year: c. 1874
- Medium: Pastel
- Dimensions: 71 cm × 89 cm (28 in × 35 in)
- Location: Petit Palais, Paris

In a Park is a pastel painting on paper mounted on cardboard, executed c. 1874 by French artist Berthe Morisot. It is held at the Petit Palais in Paris.

== Description ==
The painting depicts a young woman in a leisure time in a park with two little girls and a dog. The woman, dressed in black and with a hat, is seated in the foreground in a field of long grass, holding a reclined child, while her dog sits in front of them. A net used to catch butterflies lies at her left. In the middle distance stands a small girl holding her straw hat, and in the background are trees.

The painting demonstrates both the influence of naturalist master Camille Corot and of impressionist painter Édouard Manet, a friend of Morisot, with whose contemporary work it has some similarities. The influence seems to have been mutual between both painters, and Morisot married Édouard's brother, Eugène Manet, in 1874. One of the two children is Jeanne Pontillon (1870-1921), niece of the painter and daughter of Edma, Berthe's sister.
