= Le Corsage Noir =

1878 painting by Berthe Morisot

- The Black Bodice (English)
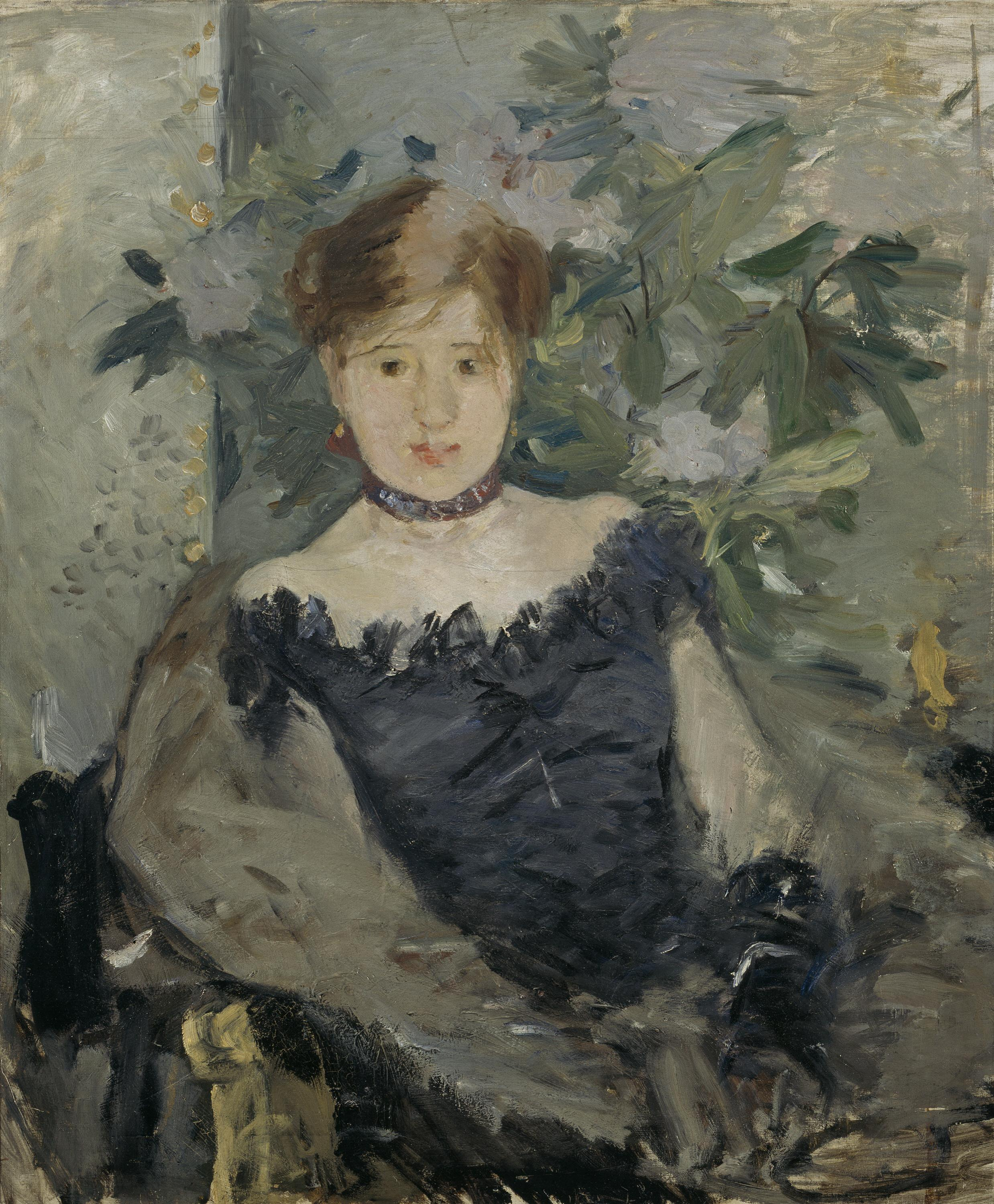
- Artist: Berthe Morisot
- Year: 1878
- Medium: Oil on canvas
- Movement: Impressionism
- Subject: Unidentified professional model in evening dress
- Dimensions: 73 cm × 65 cm (29 in × 26 in)
- Location: National Gallery of Ireland, Dublin
- Accession: NGI.984

Le Corsage Noir (English: The Black Bodice) is an oil-on-canvas painting made in 1878 by the French Impressionist artist Berthe Morisot. It depicts an unidentified professional model seated in evening dress, with foliage and pale flowers behind her. The painting measures 73 cm × 65 cm (29 in × 26 in) and belongs to the National Gallery of Ireland in Dublin, which purchased it in 1936.

The model's gown belonged to Morisot, who wore it in formal studio photographs taken in 1875. Morisot rendered the nominally black bodice with feathery strokes of dark-blue pigment. The work forms part of a group of portrait-like paintings of fashionably dressed women in interiors that she produced between 1878 and 1880, using the figure to investigate light, colour and the relation between a sitter and her surroundings.

The painting remained with Morisot's daughter, Julie Manet, and Julie's husband, Ernest Rouart, before passing through M. Knoedler & Co. in London. Morisot also depicted it as a framed picture hanging in the background of her 1894 painting La Coiffure, now in the National Museum of Fine Arts, Buenos Aires.

== Date and context ==
Morisot exhibited at the first Impressionist exhibition in 1874 and at most of the group's subsequent independent exhibitions. Her subjects included landscapes, gardens and domestic interiors, often centred on the appearance and activities of middle-class women. During the late 1870s she painted several fashionable, unnamed women indoors. The National Gallery of Ireland identifies the sitter in Le Corsage Noir as a professional model rather than a portrait subject from Morisot's family.

Julie Manet was born in November 1878. The National Gallery of Ireland has proposed that the practical restrictions surrounding Morisot's pregnancy and the birth may have prompted her to pursue within the studio some of the effects of light and colour that she had previously studied outdoors.

The present museum catalogue dates Le Corsage Noir to 1878. The catalogue of Morisot's posthumous retrospective at the Durand-Ruel Gallery in Paris in 1896 listed the painting as number 11 and assigned it the date 1876. The 1961 catalogue raisonné records it as catalogue number 74.

== Description ==
The seated figure fills most of the vertical canvas and faces the viewer directly. Her dark hair is drawn back from her face, and a narrow black choker encircles her neck. A low, off-the-shoulder bodice exposes her upper chest and shoulders. Translucent grey fabric lies around her arms and lap, while dark gloves and the arms of the chair close the lower part of the composition. Pale blossoms and green leaves occupy the space behind her, but the loosely worked setting does not resolve into a clearly defined wall, window or garden.

The dress is built from dark-blue marks rather than an even field of black. Blue-grey strokes cross the bodice and soften its edges against the model's wrap and the surrounding interior. Similar broken marks form the hair, foliage and flowers. Cream, pink and grey tones model the face, neck and shoulders, producing a strong tonal contrast with the dress.

The title identifies the garment rather than the sitter. Morisot frequently dressed professional models in clothes and accessories from her own wardrobe and posed them in her home. Art historian Claire Moran regards this practice as an indirect form of the artist's presence within otherwise anonymous figure paintings.

== Style and interpretation ==
The National Gallery of Ireland characterises the painting as an Impressionist exercise in light and colour. The rapidly applied strokes avoid a hard separation between the model, her clothing and the floral setting. The pale skin appears illuminated from more than one direction, while the natural forms behind the sitter are handled with the same abbreviated touch as the figure.

Moran places Le Corsage Noir within what she calls Morisot's “plein-air interior”, an indoor mode governed by the colour, light and broken facture associated with painting outdoors. She argues that the vigorous brushwork and light tonal range integrate the sitter with the surrounding vegetation instead of treating the background as a secondary enclosure. In Moran's account, Morisot's anonymous Parisiennes are neither portraits of named personalities nor figures carrying a conventional narrative; their formal relation to light and setting supplies the principal structure of the paintings.

Sinéad Helena Furlong interprets the sitter as an uneasy débutante conscious of her appearance and of being observed. Furlong connects the picture's incompletely defined dress and visible brushwork with a distancing effect found in several of Morisot's images of fashionably dressed young women. In that reading, the surface withholds the tactile finish common in contemporary society portraiture and introduces tension into the public display of marriageable femininity.

== Appearance in La Coiffure ==
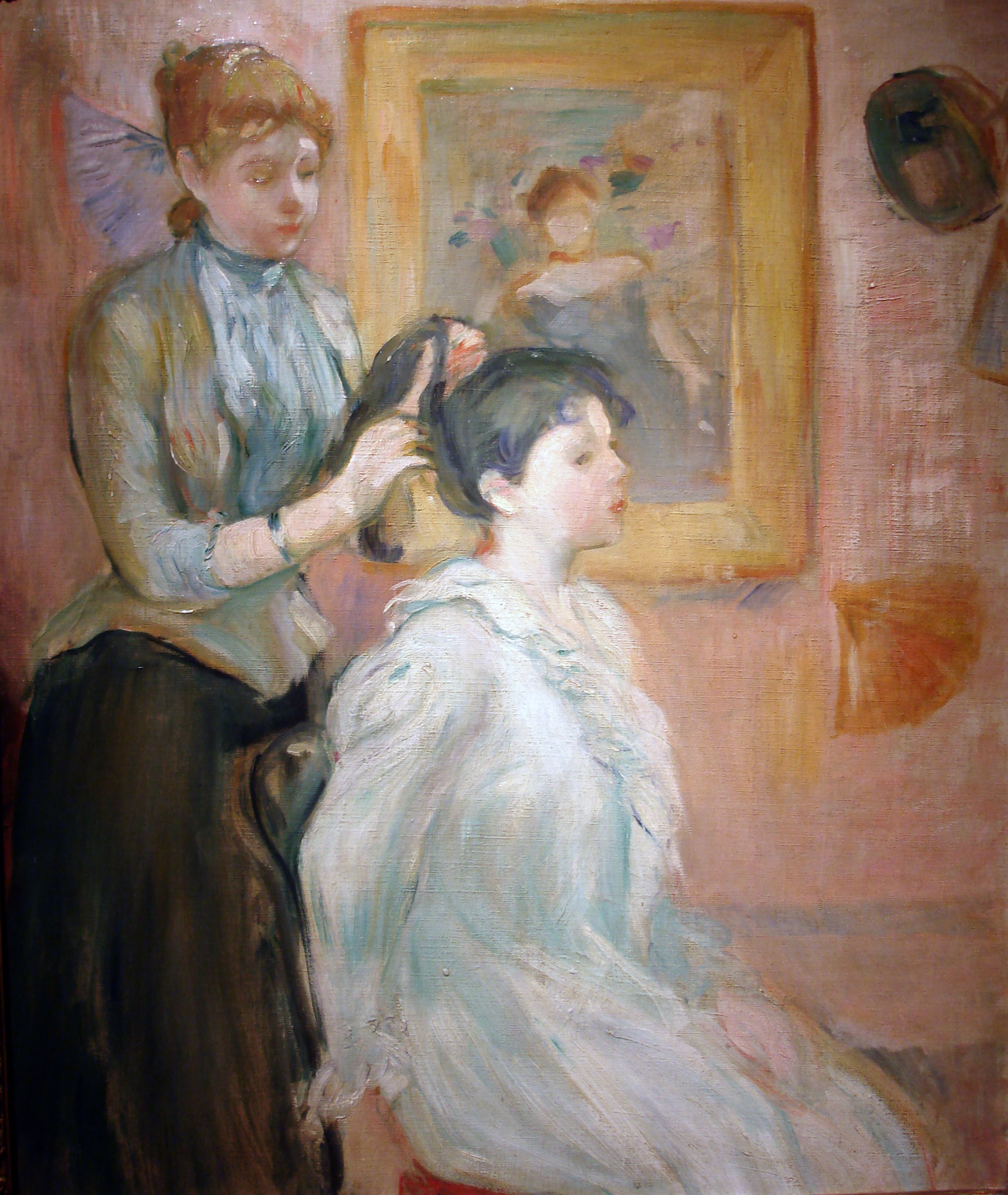
Morisot's La Coiffure (1894), with Le Corsage Noir hanging on the wall

In 1894 Morisot included Le Corsage Noir in the interior of La Coiffure. The later painting shows a dark-haired woman in a white garment seated while a blonde woman arranges her hair. A small framed rendering of Le Corsage Noir hangs on the pink wall behind them among mirrors and fans.

The Buenos Aires museum identifies the two figures in La Coiffure as the professional models Marthe and Jeanne-Marie, who posed in Morisot's studio on the rue Weber. Its catalogue reads the framed painting as one of the objects that establish the social setting of the room and interprets its ball-dressed figure as an emblem of feminine beauty and success.

== Provenance and exhibitions ==
After Morisot's death in 1895, Le Corsage Noir remained with Julie Manet and Ernest Rouart in Paris. It subsequently entered the stock of Knoedler's London gallery. The National Gallery of Ireland purchased it from Knoedler in 1936 and assigned it the accession number NGI.984.

The first documented public showing was the Durand-Ruel retrospective of 1896. Further displays before the Dublin acquisition included Morisot exhibitions at Durand-Ruel in 1902; the Institut français in Saint Petersburg and Galerie Manzi-Joyant in Paris in 1912; Galerie Bernheim-Jeune in 1919 and 1929; Galerie Marcel Bernheim in 1922; the Leicester Galleries in London in 1930; and Knoedler's London gallery in 1936.

After entering the National Gallery of Ireland, the painting appeared in the Exhibition of Modern Continental Paintings at the National College of Art in Dublin in 1944 and in the gallery's centenary exhibition in 1964. It travelled to the National Gallery of Art in Washington, D.C., for Berthe Morisot—Impressionist in 1987, to three French museums in 1989, and to five Japanese venues in 1996–1997.

Later exhibitions included Impressionism: Painting Quickly in France, 1860–1890 at the National Gallery in London and the Van Gogh Museum in Amsterdam in 2000–2001; a Morisot retrospective at the Palais des Beaux-Arts de Lille in 2002; Women in Impressionism at the Ny Carlsberg Glyptotek in Copenhagen in 2006–2007; Impressionist Interiors in Dublin in 2008; and the 2012 Morisot retrospective at the Musée Marmottan Monet in Paris. In 2024 it was shown in Impressionism and its Overlooked Women at Ordrupgaard and in Women Impressionists at the National Gallery of Ireland.
