= Paul Valéry =

French poet, essayist, and philosopher (1871–1945)

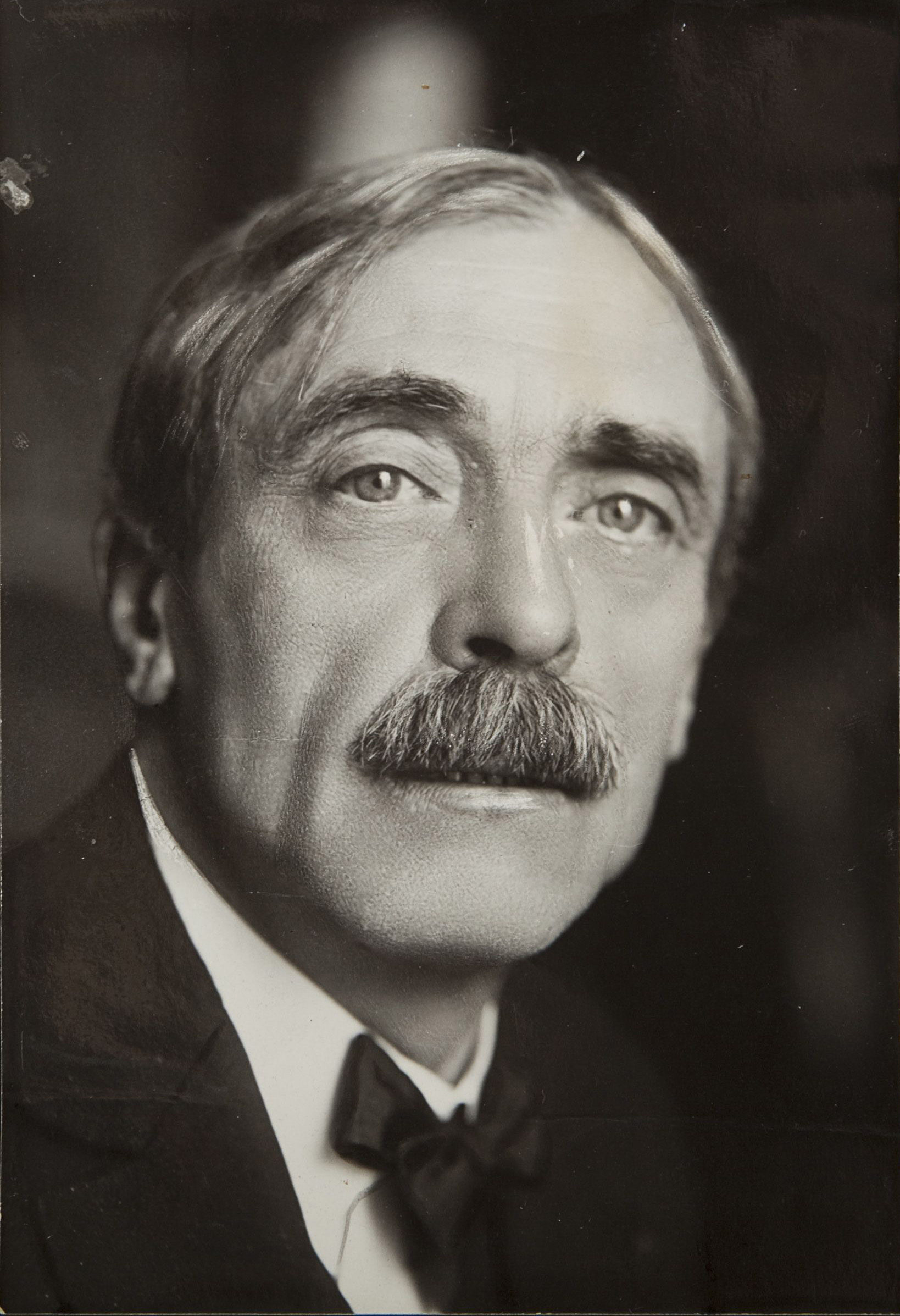
- Valéry c. 1925
- Born: Ambroise Paul Toussaint Jules Valéry; 30 October 1871; Sète, France
- Died: 20 July 1945 (aged 73); Paris, France
- Education: Collège de France
- Spouse: Jeannie Gobillard
- Partner: Catherine Pozzi
- Children: 1
- Writing career
- Language: French
- Genres: Poetry; Philosophy; Essayist

Ambroise Paul Toussaint Jules Valéry (French: [pɔl valeʁi]; 30 October 1871 – 20 July 1945) was a French poet, essayist, and philosopher. In addition to his poetry and fiction (drama and dialogues), his interests included aphorisms on art, history, letters, music, and current events.

Valéry was nominated for the Nobel Prize in Literature in 12 different years.

== Biography ==
Valéry was born in Sète, a town on the Mediterranean coast of the Hérault, but he was raised in Montpellier, a larger urban center close by. After a traditional Roman Catholic education, he studied law at university and then resided in Paris for most of the remainder of his life, where he was, for a while, part of the circle of Stéphane Mallarmé.

In 1900, he married Jeannine Gobillard, a friend of Stéphane Mallarmé's family, a niece of the painter Berthe Morisot. The wedding was a double ceremony in which the bride's cousin and Berthe Morisot's daughter, Julie Manet, married the painter Ernest Rouart. Valéry and Gobillard had three children: Claude, Agathe and François.

Valéry served as a juror with Florence Meyer Blumenthal in awarding the Prix Blumenthal, a grant given between 1919 and 1954 to young French painters, sculptors, decorators, engravers, writers, and musicians.

Though his earliest publications date from his mid-twenties, Valéry did not become a full-time writer until he was fifty. He briefly earned a living at the Ministry of War before assuming a relatively flexible post as private secretary to the increasingly impaired Edouard Lebey, a former chief executive of the Havas news agency. He held this position for over twenty years, until Lebey's death in 1922.

In 1920, he began a tumultuous affair with a fellow poet, Catherine Pozzi, which lasted for eight years.

After his election to the Académie française in 1925, Valéry became a tireless public speaker and intellectual figure in French society, touring Europe and giving lectures on cultural and social issues as well as assuming a number of official positions eagerly offered to him by an admiring French nation. He represented France on cultural matters at the League of Nations, and he served on several of its committees, including the sub-committee on Arts and Letters of the Committee on Intellectual Cooperation. The English-language collection The Outlook for Intelligence (1989) contains translations of a dozen essays related to these activities.

In 1931, he founded the Collège International de Cannes, a private institution teaching French language and civilization. The Collège is still operating today, offering professional courses for native speakers (for educational certification, law and business) as well as courses for foreign students.

He gave the keynote address at the 1932 German national celebration of the 100th anniversary of the death of Johann Wolfgang Goethe. This was a fitting choice, as Valéry shared Goethe's fascination with science (specifically, biology and optics).

In addition to his activities as a member of the Académie française, he was also a member of the Academy of Sciences of Lisbon, and of the Front national des Ecrivains. In 1937, he was appointed chief executive of what later became the University of Nice. He was the inaugural holder of the Chair of Poetics at the Collège de France.

During World War II, the Vichy regime stripped him of some of these jobs and distinctions because of his quiet refusal to collaborate with Vichy and the German occupation. Valéry continued, nevertheless, throughout these troubled years to publish and to be active in French cultural life, especially as a member of the Académie française. In 1942, he became a member of the National Committee of Writers, an offshoot of the anti-Nazi resistance movement National Front.

Valéry was nominated for the Nobel Prize in Literature twelve times. It is believed that the Swedish Academy intended to award Valéry the prize in 1945, had he not died that year.

Valéry died in Paris in July 1945. He is buried in the cemetery of his native town, Sète, the same cemetery celebrated in his famous poem Le Cimetière marin.

== Work ==
=== The great silence ===
Valéry is best known as a poet and sometimes considered to be the last of the French symbolists. However, he published fewer than a hundred poems, and none of them drew much attention. On the night of 4 October 1892, during a heavy storm, Valéry underwent an existential crisis, an event that had a significant impact on his writing career. Eventually, around 1898, he quit writing altogether, publishing not a word for nearly twenty years. This hiatus was due in part to the death of his mentor, Stéphane Mallarmé. When, in 1917, he finally broke his "great silence" with the publication of La Jeune Parque, he was 46 years old.

=== La Jeune Parque ===
"La Jeune Parque" is composed of 512 alexandrine lines in rhyming couplets and took four years to complete, immediately securing his fame. With "Le Cimetière marin" and "L'Ébauche d'un serpent", it is often considered one of the greatest French poems of the twentieth century.

The title was chosen late in the poem's gestation; it refers to the youngest of the three Parcae (the minor Roman deities also called The Fates), though for some readers the connection with that mythological figure is tenuous and problematic.

The poem is written in the first person, and is the soliloquy of a young woman contemplating life and death, engagement and withdrawal, and love and estrangement in a setting dominated by the sea, the sky, stars, rocky cliffs, and the rising sun. However, it is also possible to read the poem as an allegory on the way fate moves human affairs or as an attempt to comprehend the horrific violence in Europe at the time of the poem's composition. The poem is not about World War I, but it does try to address the relationships between destruction and beauty, and, in this sense, it resonates with ancient Greek meditations on these matters, especially in the plays of Sophocles and Aeschylus. There are, therefore, evident links with le Cimetière marin, which is also a seaside meditation on comparably large themes.

=== Other works ===
Before la Jeune Parque, Valéry's only publications of note were dialogues, articles, some poems, and a study of Leonardo da Vinci. In 1920 and 1922, he published two slim collections of verses. The first, Album des vers anciens (Album of old verses), was a revision of early but beautifully wrought smaller poems, some of which had been published individually before 1900. The second, Charmes (from the Latin carmina, meaning "songs" and also "incantations"), further confirmed his reputation as a major French poet. The collection includes le Cimetière marin, and many smaller poems with diverse structures.

=== Technique ===
Valéry's technique is quite orthodox in its essentials. His verse rhymes and scans in conventional ways, and it has much in common with the work of Mallarmé. His poem "Palme" inspired James Merrill's celebrated 1974 poem "Lost in Translation", and his cerebral lyricism also influenced American poet Edgar Bowers.

=== Prose works ===
Valéry described his "true oeuvre" to be prose, and he filled more than 28,000 notebook pages over his lifetime. His far more ample prose writings, peppered with many aphorisms and bons mots, reveal a skeptical outlook on human nature, verging on the cynical. His view of state power was broadly liberal insofar as he believed that state power and infringements on the individual should be severely limited. Although he had flirted with nationalist ideas during the 1890s, he moved away from them by 1899, and believed that European culture owed its greatness to the ethnic diversity and universalism of the Roman Empire. He denounced the myth of "racial purity" and argued that such purity, if it existed, would only lead to stagnation—thus the mixing of races was necessary for progress and cultural development. In "America as a Projection of the European Mind", Valéry remarked that whenever he despaired about Europe's situation, he could "restore some degree of hope only by thinking of the New World" and mused on the "happy variations" which could result from European "aesthetic ideas filtering into the powerful character of native Mexican art."

Raymond Poincaré, Louis de Broglie, André Gide, Henri Bergson, and Albert Einstein all respected Valéry's thinking and became friendly correspondents. Valéry was often asked to write articles on various topics; the resulting intellectual journalism was collected in five volumes titled Variétés.

=== Notebooks ===
Valéry's most striking achievement is perhaps his monumental intellectual diary, the Cahiers ("Notebooks"). Early every morning of his adult life, he contributed something to the Cahiers, prompting him to write: "Having dedicated those hours to the life of the mind, I thereby earn the right to be stupid for the rest of the day."

The subjects of his Cahiers entries often were, surprisingly, reflections on science and mathematics. He dedicated significantly more time to these subjects than to his poetry. The Cahiers also contain the first drafts of many aphorisms he later included in his books. To date, the Cahiers have been published in their entirety only as photostatic reproductions, and only since 1980 have they begun to receive scholarly scrutiny. The Cahiers have been translated into English in five volumes published by Peter Lang.

In recent decades, Valéry's thought has been considered a touchstone in the field of constructivist epistemology, as noted, for instance, by Jean-Louis Le Moigne in his description of constructivist history.

== In other literature ==
One of three epigraphs in Cormac McCarthy's novel Blood Meridian is from Valéry's "Writing at the Yalu River" (1895): "Your ideas are terrifying and your hearts are faint. Your acts of pity and cruelty are absurd, committed with no calm, as if they were irresistible. Finally, you fear blood more and more. Blood and time".

In the book El laberinto de la soledad by Octavio Paz, there are three lines from Valéry's poem "La jeune parque":

Je pense, sur le bord doré de l'univers
A ce gout de périr qui prend la Pythonisse
En qui mugit l'espoir que le monde finisse.

("I think, at the golden brink of the universe, / Of that longing for death which possessed the Sibyl / And which feeds on the hope that the last days are near.") In Ray Bradbury's Fahrenheit 451, the book-burning fire chief Beatty quotes Valéry:

The folly of mistaking a paradox for a discovery, a metaphor for a proof, a torrent of verbiage for a spring of capital truths, and oneself for an oracle, is inborn in us.

== In popular culture ==
Oscar-winning Japanese director Hayao Miyazaki's 2013 film The Wind Rises and the Japanese novel of the same name (on which the film was partially based) take their title from Valéry's verse Le vent se lève... il faut tenter de vivre ! ("The wind rises… We must try to live!") in the poem "Le Cimetière marin" (The Graveyard by the Sea). The same quote is used in the closing sentences of Anthony Burgess's 1962 novel The Wanting Seed. "Le Cimetière marin" is also quoted in the 1980 French comic "Le concombre masqué: Comment devenir maître du monde?" by Mandryka.

== Selected works ==
- Conte de nuits (1888)
- Paradoxe sur l'architecte (1891)
- Introduction à la méthode de Léonard de Vinci (1895)
- La soirée avec monsieur Teste (1896)
- La Jeune Parque (1917)
- Album des vers anciens (1920)
- Le cimetière marin (1920)
- Charmes (1922)
- Eupalinos ou l'Architecte (1923)
- Variétés I (1924)
- La Crise de l'Esprit (1924)
- L'Âme et la Danse (1925)
- Variétés II (1930)
- Regards sur le monde actuel. (1931)
- L'idée fixe (1932)
- Moralités (1932)
- Variétés III (1936)
- Degas, danse, dessin (1936)
- Variétes IV (1938)
- Mauvaises pensées et autres (1942)
- Tel quel (1943)
- Variétes V (1944)
- Vues (1948)
- Œuvres I (1957), édition établie et annotée par Jean Hytier, Bibliothèque de la Pléiade / nrf Gallimard
- Œuvres II (1960), édition établie et annotée par Jean Hytier, Bibliothèque de la Pléiade / nrf Gallimard
- Prose et Vers (1968)
- Cahiers I (1973), édition établie, présentée et annotée par Judith Robinson-Valéry, Bibliothèque de la Pléiade / nrf Gallimard
- Cahiers II (1974), édition établie, présentée et annotée par Judith Robinson-Valéry, Bibliothèque de la Pléiade / nrf Gallimard
- Cahiers (1894–1914) (1987), édition publiée sous la direction de Nicole Celeyrette-Pietri et Judith Robinson-Valéry avec la collaboration de Jean Celeyrette, Maria Teresa Giaveri, Paul Gifford, Jeannine Jallat, Bernard Lacorre, Huguette Laurenti, Florence de Lussy, Robert Pickering, Régine Pietra et Jürgen Schmidt-Radefeldt, tomes I-IX, Collection blanche, Gallimard

=== English translations ===
- Selected Writings of Paul Valéry (New Directions, 1964)
- "Sketch of a Serpent", trans. R. A. Christmas in Dialogue (Spring 1968). Second version printed in Christmas's collection of his own work, Leaves of Sass (2019).
- Collected Works of Paul Valéry, series ed. Jackson Mathews (Princeton University Press, 1956–75)
  - Volume 1. Poems, translated by David Paul. On Poets and Poetry, selected and translated from the Notebooks, by James R. Lawler
  - Volume 2. Poems in the Rough, translated by H. Corke
  - Volume 3. Plays, translated by David Paul and R. Fitzgerald
  - Volume 4. Dialogues, translated by W. M. Stewart
  - Volume 5. Idée fixe, translated by David Paul
  - Volume 6. Monsieur Teste, translated by J. Mathews
  - Volume 7. The Art of Poetry, translated by Denise Folliot. With an Introduction by T. S. Eliot.
  - Volume 8. Leonardo, Poe, Mallarmé, translated by Malcolm Cowley and James R. Lawler
  - Volume 9. Masters and Friends, translated by M. Turnell
  - Volume 10. History and Politics, translated by D. Folliot and J. Mathews
  - Volume 11. Occasions, translated by Roger Shattuck and Frederick Brown
  - Volume 12. Degas, Manet, Morisot, translated by David Paul. With an introduction by Douglas Cooper
  - Volume 13. Aesthetics, translated by R. Manheim
  - Volume 14. Analects, translated by S. Gilbert
  - Volume 15. Moi, translated by M. and J. Mathews.
- Paul Valery: An Anthology, ed. James R. Lawler (Princeton, 1977)
- The Outlook for Intelligence, trans. Denise Folliot and Jackson Mathews (Princeton University Press, 1989)
- Cahiers/Notebooks, series ed. Brian Stimpson (Peter Lang, 2000–10)
  - Volume 1, translated by Paul Gifford, Siân Miles, Robert Pickering and Brian Stimpson (2000)
  - Volume 2, translated by Rachel Killick, Robert Pickering, Norma Rinsler, Stephen Romer and Brian Stimpson (2000)
  - Volume 3, translated by Norma Rinsler, Paul Ryan and Brian Stimpson (2007)
  - Volume 4, translated and edited by Brian Stimpson, Paul Gifford, Robert Pickering, Norma Rinsler and Rima Joseph (2010)
  - Volume 5, translated and edited by Brian Stimpson, Paul Gifford, Robert Pickering and Norma Rinsler (2010)
- The Idea of Perfection: The Poetry and Prose of Paul Valéry; A Bilingual Edition. Trans. Nathaniel Rudavsky-Brody (Farrar, Straus and Giroux, 2020).
- Collected Verse, trans. Paul Ryan (Oxford University Press, 2024).
- Monsieur Teste, trans. Charlotte Mandell (New York Review Books, 2024)

== See also ==
- Bonini's paradox
- Paul Valéry University, Montpellier III
- Frantz Fanon
