= Ernest Rouart =

French painter and art collector (1874–1942)

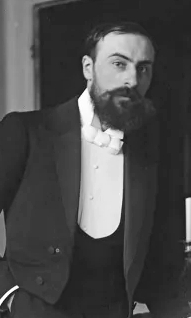
Ernest Rouart (1900s)

Ernest Rouart (24 August 1874, Paris – 27 February 1942, Paris) was a French painter, watercolorist, pastellist, engraver, and art collector.

== Biography ==
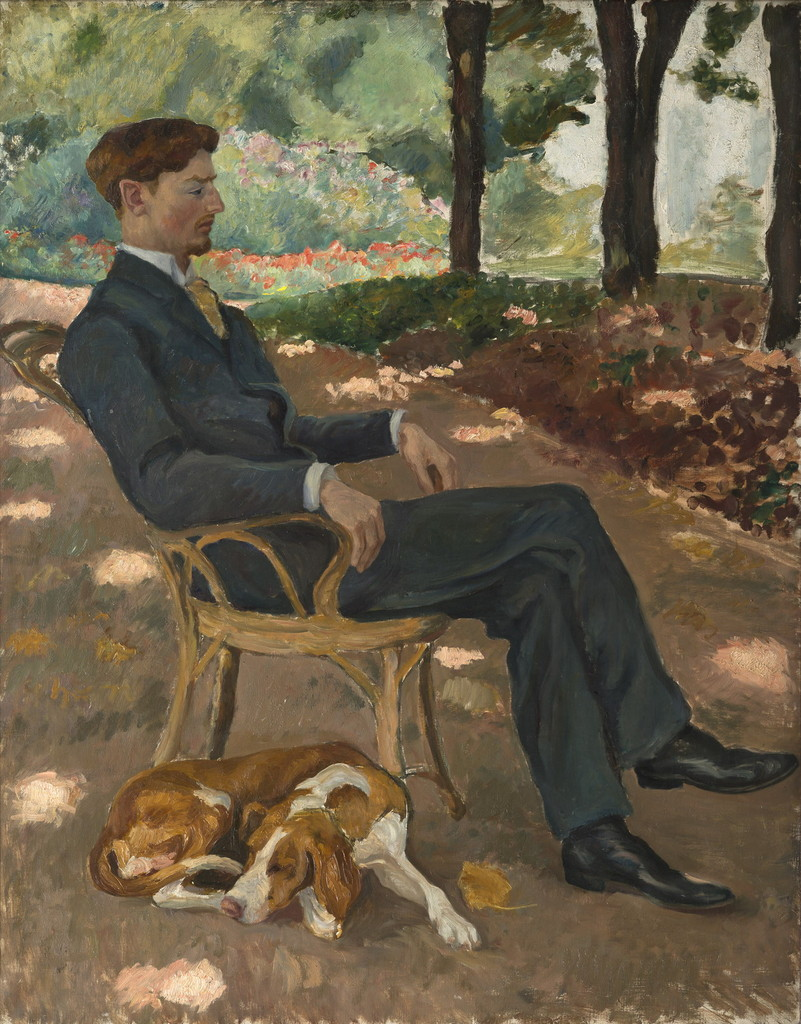
Man with a Dog (his brother, Eugène)

He was one of four sons and a daughter born to the engineer and painter, Henri Rouart. His brother, Eugène, was a well-known politician. He began by studying mathematics; intending to enter his father's business but, like his father, he turned to painting, enlisting the aid of Edgar Degas, a family friend, who gave him lessons and advised him to copy paintings at the Louvre. He also had him experiment with older mixtures of paint, as they were prepared in the Renaissance.

It was also Degas who introduced him to the painter and future art collector, Julie Manet, daughter of the painters Berthe Morisot and Eugène Manet. They married in 1900 and had three sons.

Rouart was an avid art collector, as was his father. In 1912, he and his siblings sold their late father's collection for a considerable sum. Shortly after the beginning of World War I, in 1914, Rouart obtained permission to hold a sale of Degas' paintings. His friend, then eighty years old, had fallen on hard times and needed assistance.

After beginning his career as a painter, Rouart held numerous exhibits; the first was in 1899 at the Société Nationale des Beaux-Arts. Later, he had showings at the Salon des indépendants and the Salon des Tuileries. He was a member of the governing committee for the Salon d'Automne. In 1932, he and his wife organized the "Exposition du Centenaire de Manet" at the Musée de l'Orangerie. Similar exhibitions followed, for Degas in 1934, and for Berthe Morisot in 1941.

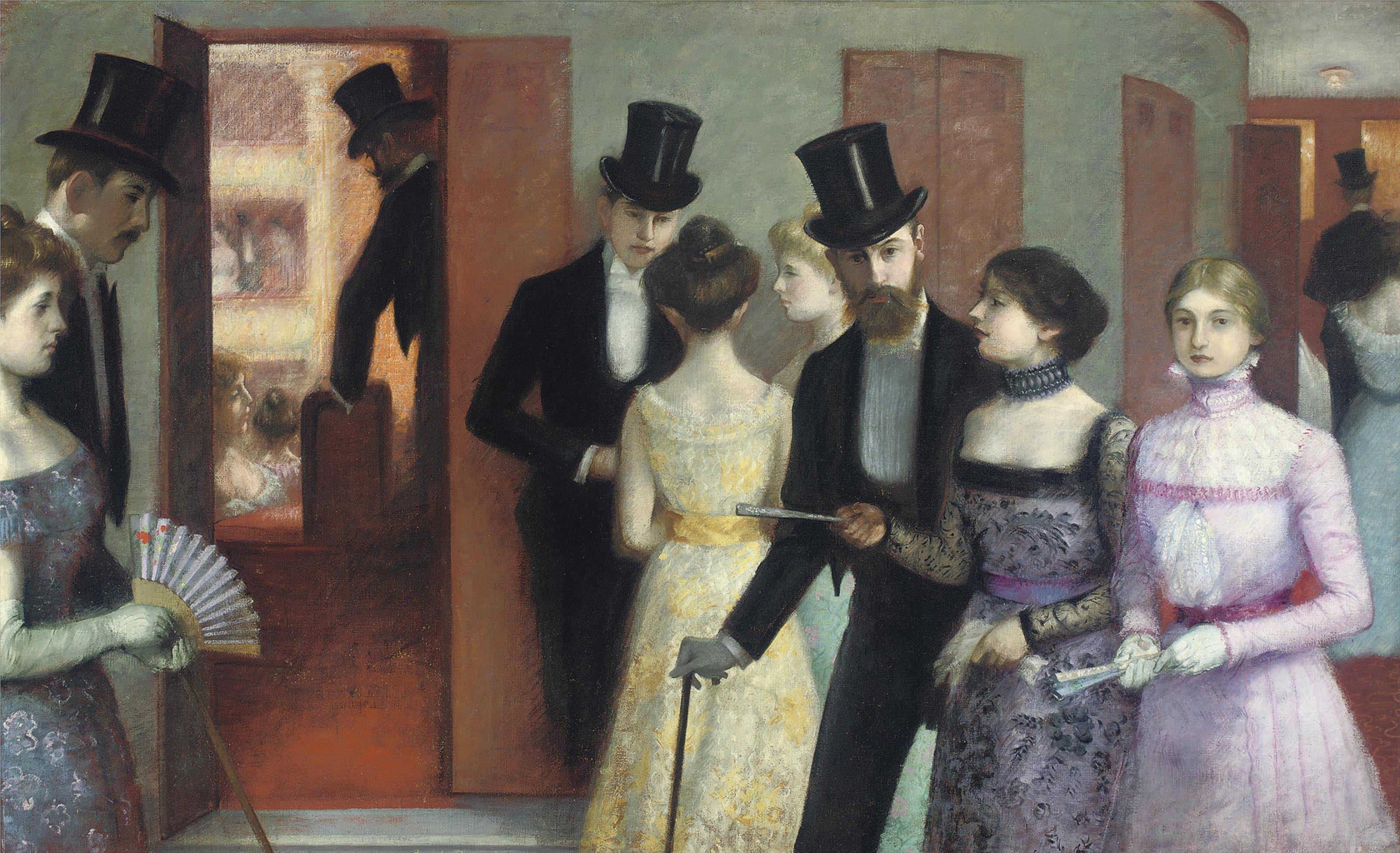
Soirée at the Opera

Rouart died during the German occupation of Paris and was interred at the Cimetière de Passy.
