= Julie Manet =

French painter

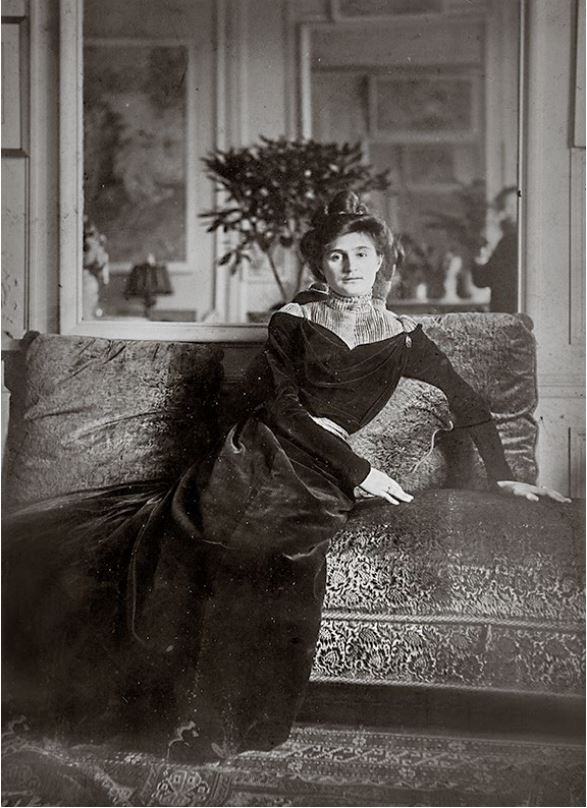
- Julie Manet in 1900
- Born: Eugénie Julie Manet; 14 November 1878; Paris, France
- Died: 14 July 1966 (aged 87); Paris, France
- Occupations: painter, art collector
- Known for: Model, author of Growing up with the Impressionists
- Spouse: Ernest Rouart
- Children: 3
- Parent(s): Berthe Morisot; Eugène Manet
- Relatives: Édouard Manet (paternal uncle)

Eugénie Julie Manet (French pronunciation: [ʒyli manɛ]; 14 November 1878 – 14 July 1966) was a French painter, model, diarist, and art collector.

== Biography ==
Born in Paris, Julie Manet was the daughter and only child of artist Berthe Morisot and artist Eugène Manet, younger brother of painter Édouard Manet. The death of both parents within a three-year period left her orphaned at the age of 16. As a result, she came under the guardianship of the poet and critic Stéphane Mallarmé and went to live with her cousins. She also received support from the family's artist friends, Renoir in particular.

Throughout her life Julie posed frequently for her mother and other Impressionist artists, including Renoir, her uncle Édouard and her cousin Paule Gobillard.

== Book ==
Her teenage diary, published in English as Growing up with the Impressionists, provides insights into the lives of French painters, including Renoir, Degas, Monet, and Sisley, as well the 1896 state visit of Tsar Nicholas II and the Dreyfus Affair, which was then raging in France. Her diary "faithfully records—and concurs with—Renoir's relentless anti-Semitism (shared, alas, by the great Degas)".

== Work ==
She was taught painting by her mother, Berthe Morisot, and later become a painter herself. Her mother died of pneumonia when Julie was 16, in 1895, and left her with large fortune.

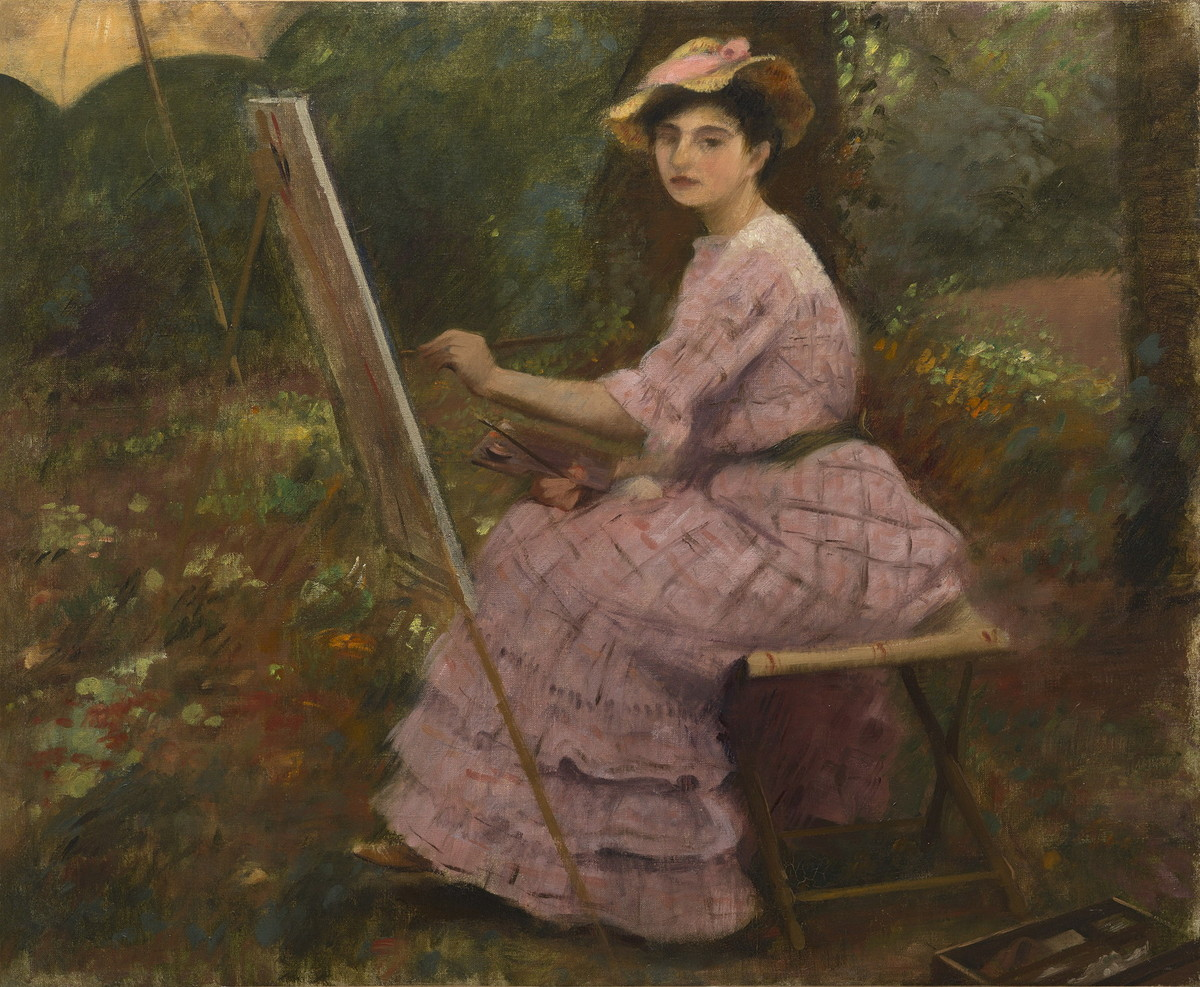
Portrait of Julie Manet painting by her husband Ernest Rouart (1905)

In May 1900 Julie married the painter and engraver Ernest Rouart, artist and son of the painter Henri Rouart. The wedding, which took place in Passy, was a double ceremony in which Julie's cousin Jeannine Gobillard (nicknamed "Bibi" and the daughter of Yves Morisot, the elder sister of Edma Morisot and Berthe Morisot), married Paul Valéry.

The couple had three children, Julien (born 1901), Clément (born 1906) and Denis (born 1908). Soon after marriage the couple undertook a restoration and redecoration of Chateau du Mesnil and painted murals. Later she also designed porcelain plates with butterflies and other insects as motifs. She devoted her life to keep the legacy of Impressionists and especially her mother alive. Together with her husband she organized many crucial exhibitions, such as Édouard Manet exhibition at the Tuileries in 1932, Edgar Degas exhibition in 1937, and Berthe Morisot’s show of 1941. In 1961 she published the very first catalog of Berthe Morisot's works. Her son, Denis Rouart, art historian and curator of the Museum of Fine Arts in Nancy, wrote the preface to the work .

She is sometimes called the Last Impressionist, or the Last Manet. Her sons Julien and Denis inherited some of her mother's paintings, now in the Marmottan Monet Museum. Denis Rouart edited The Correspondence of Berthe Morisot with her family and her friends (1959).

== Paintings by Julie Manet ==
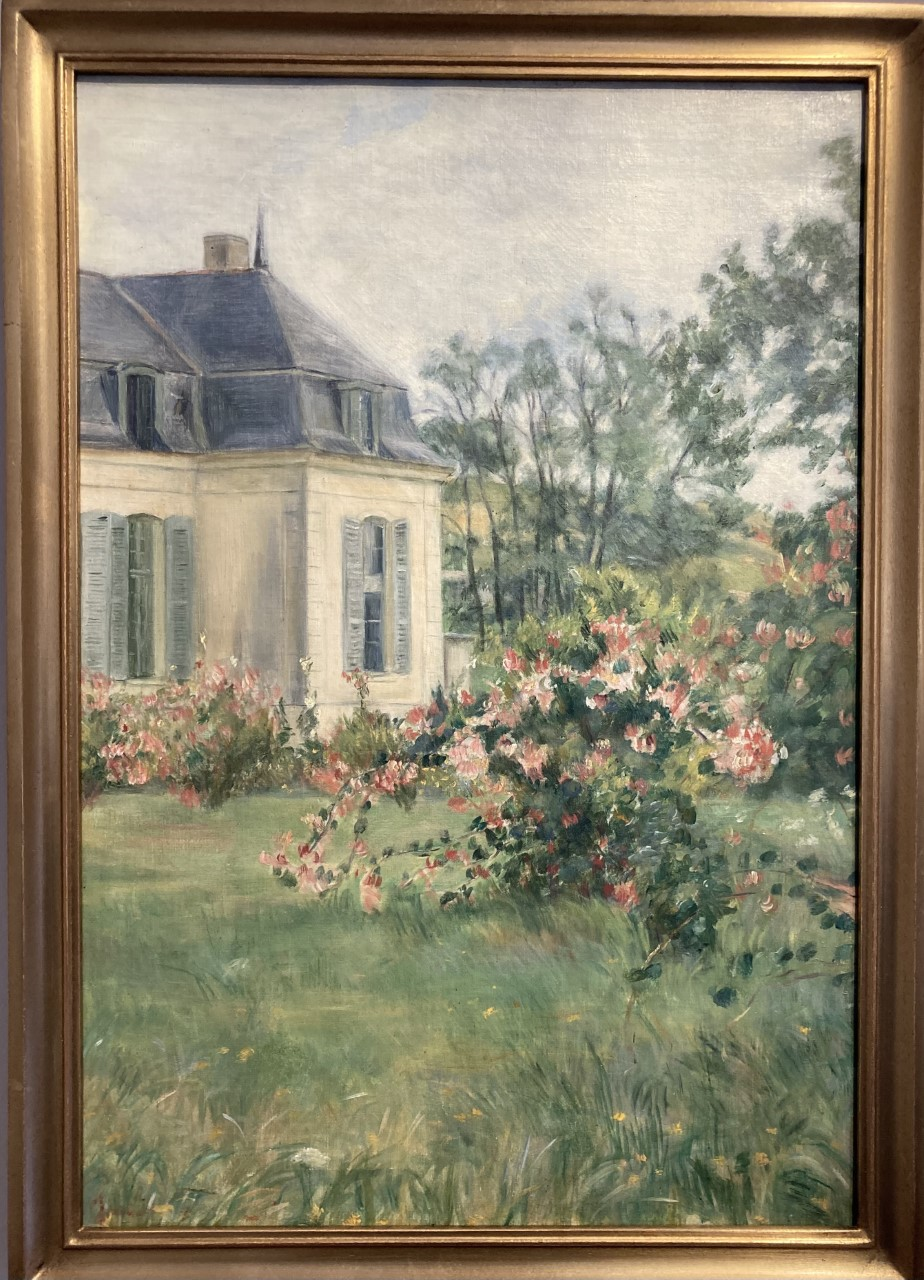
Julie Manet, Le Château du Mesnil, (c.1910)

== Julie Manet as model ==
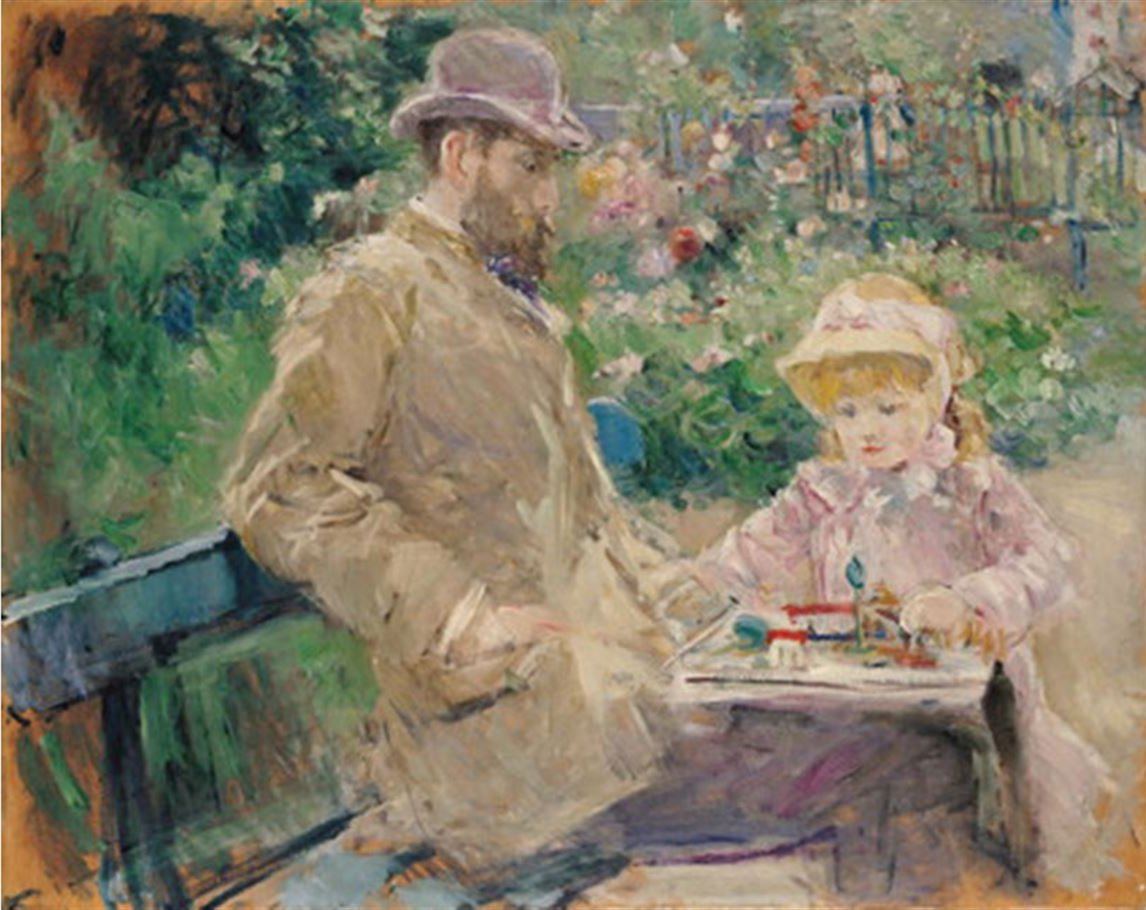
Berthe Morisot, Eugène Manet and His Daughter at Bougival, 1881

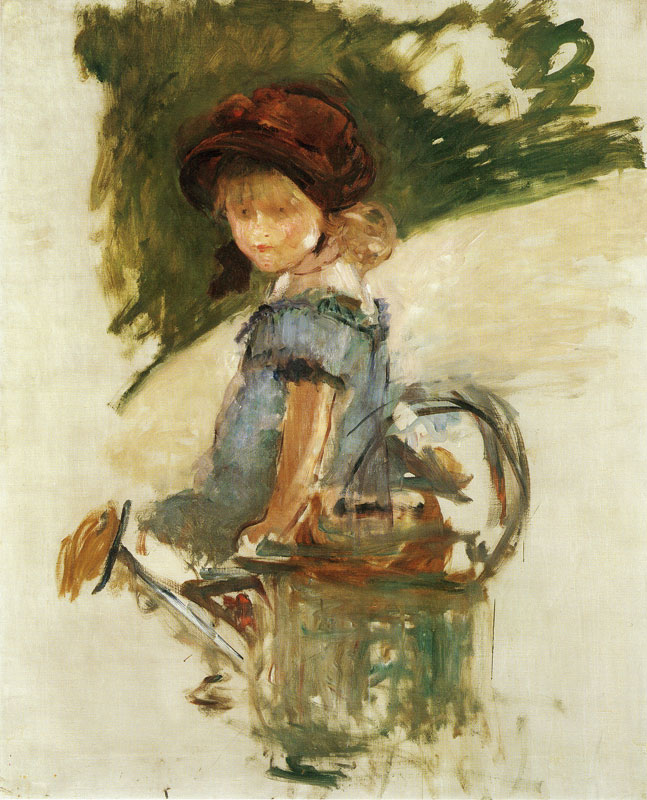
Édouard Manet, Julie Manet sitting on a Watering Can, 1882

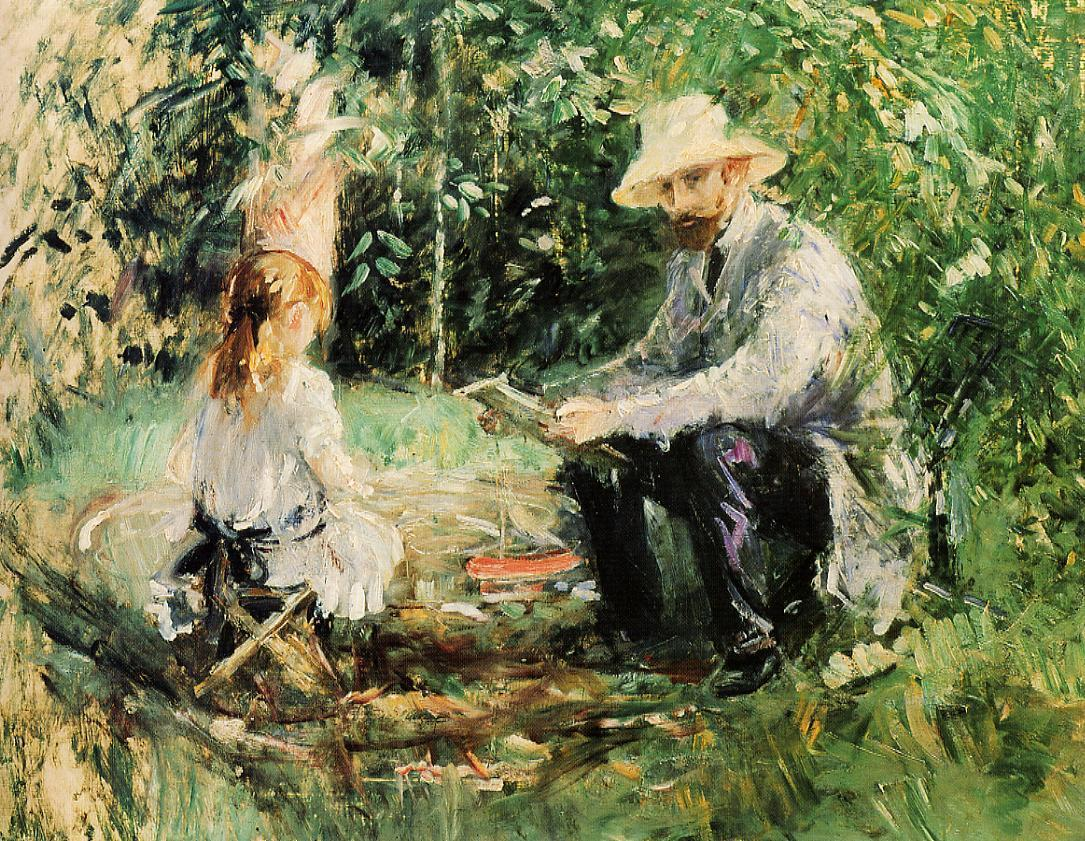
Berthe Morisot, Eugène Manet and His Daughter in the Garden, 1883

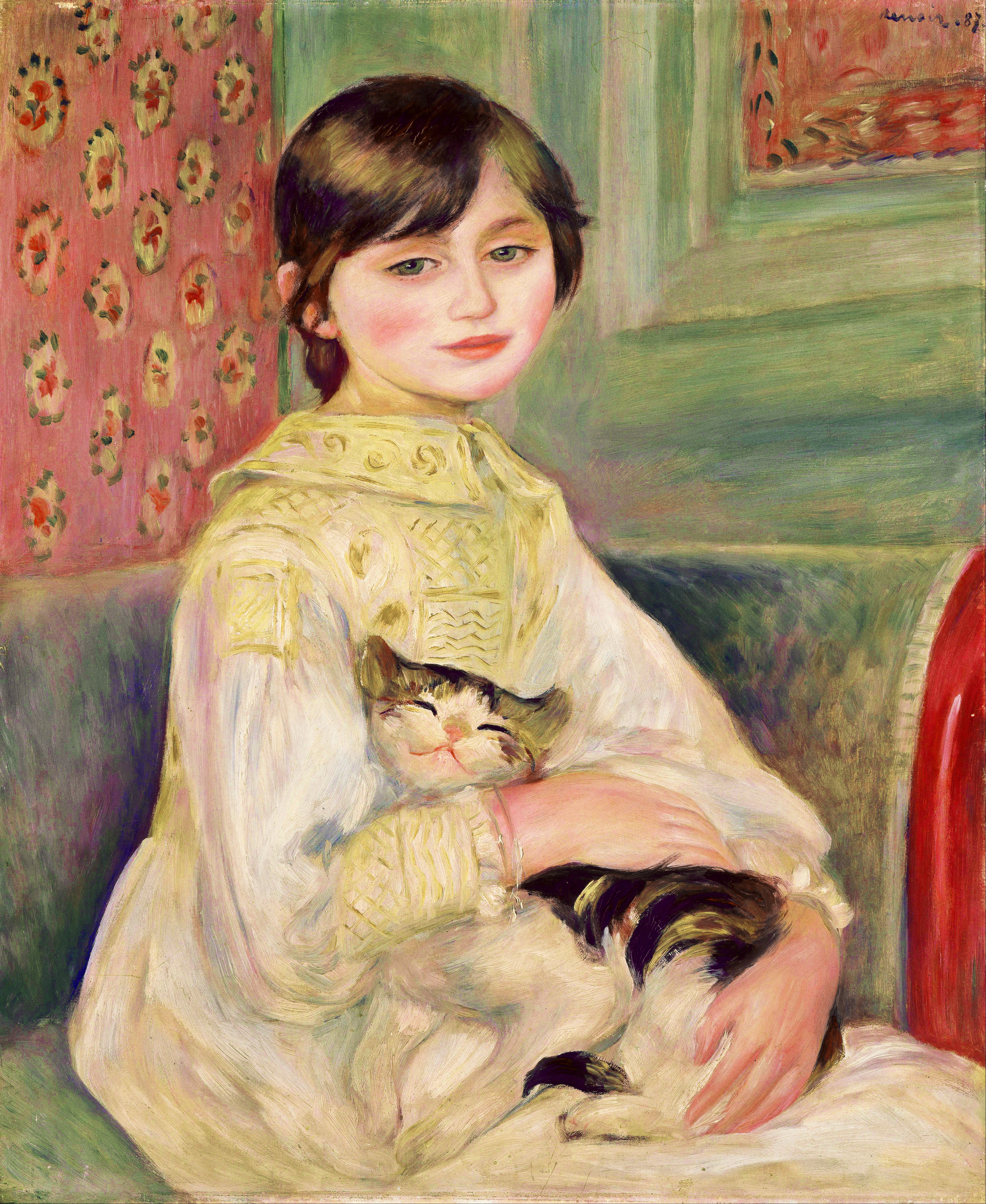
Pierre-Auguste Renoir, Julie Manet with Cat, 1887

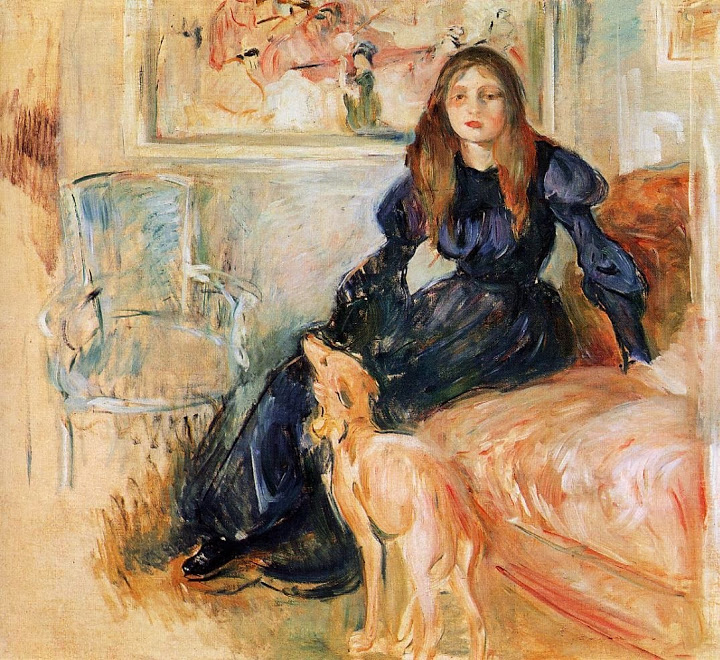
Berthe Morisot, Julie Manet and Her Greyhound Laertes, 1893

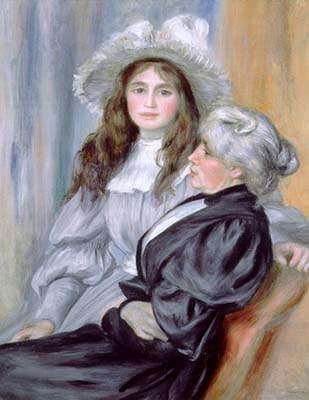
Pierre-Auguste Renoir, Portrait of Berthe Morisot and daughter Julie Manet, 1894

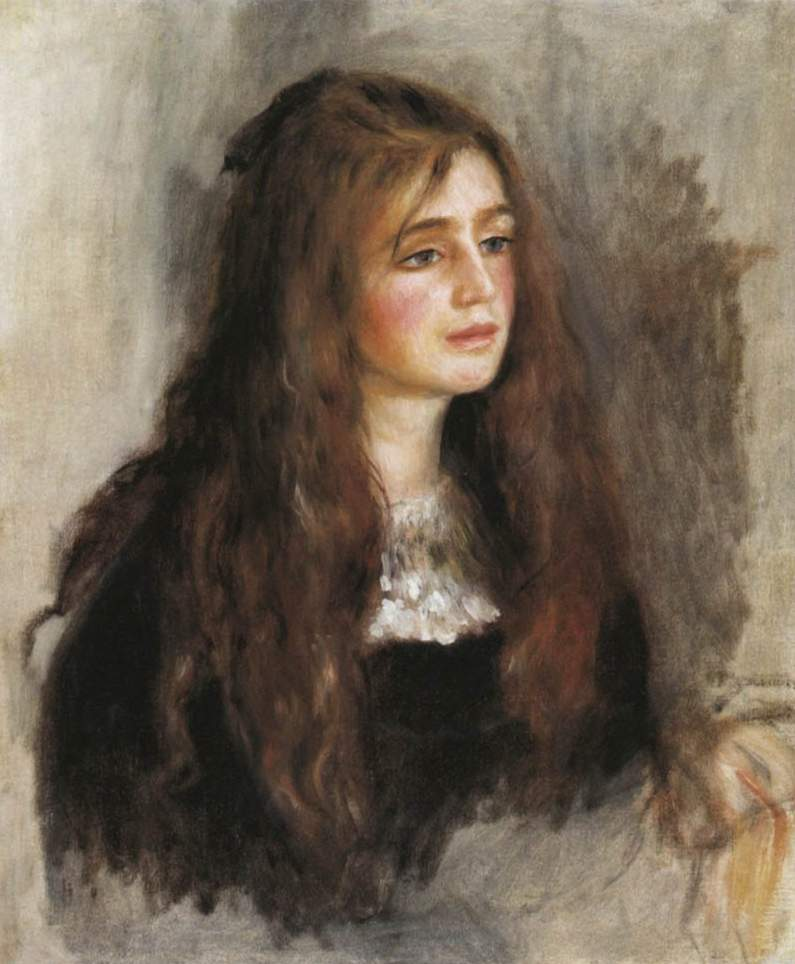
Pierre-Auguste Renoir, Portrait of Julie Manet, 1894

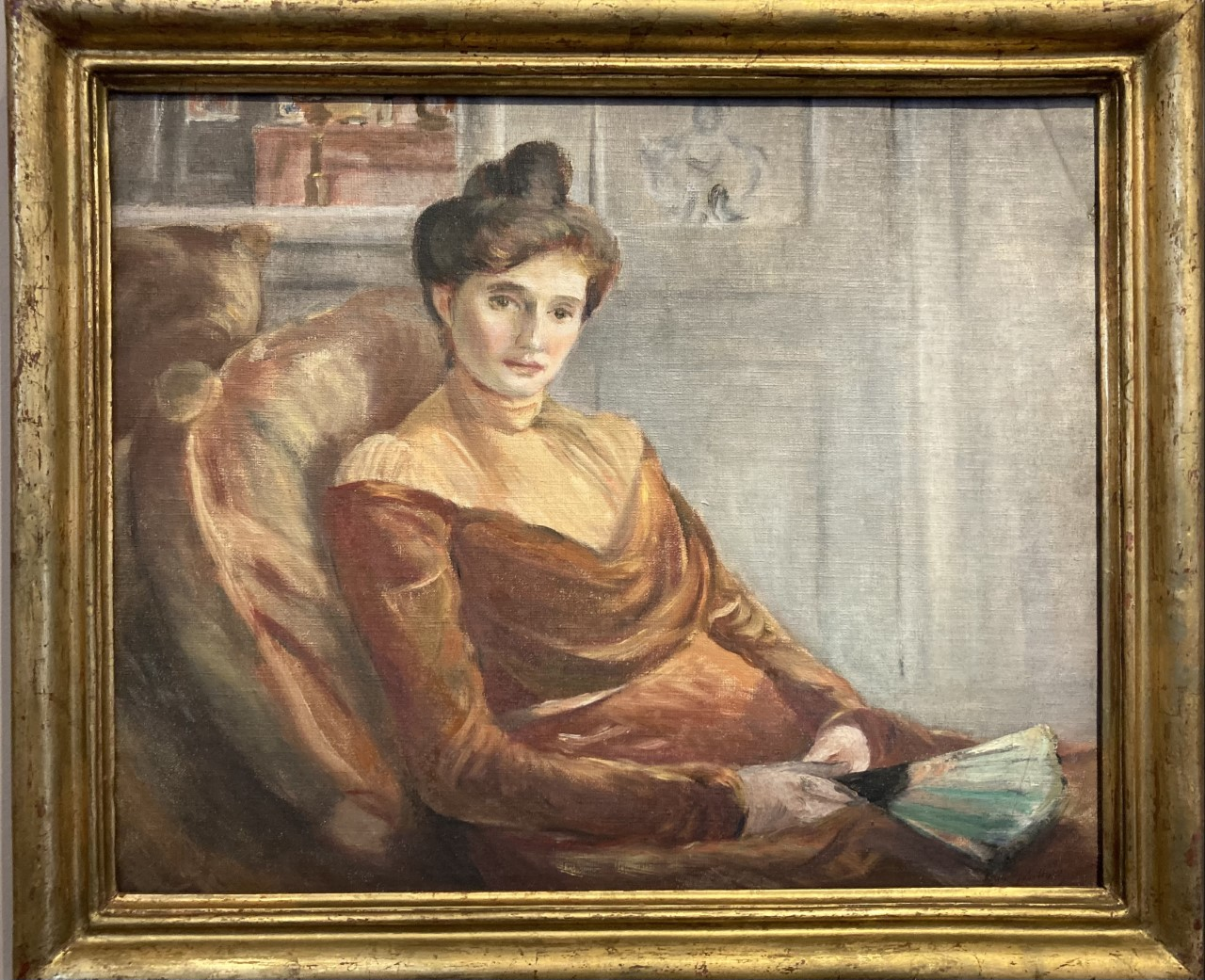
Paule Gobillard, Julie Manet, (c.1900)
