= Henri Rouart =

French painter

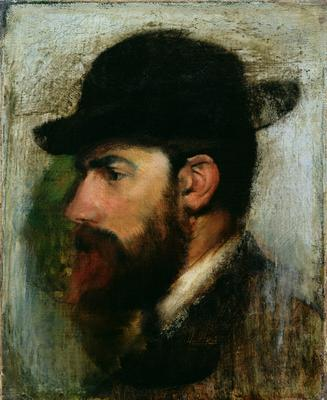
Henri Rouart; by Edgar Degas (1871)

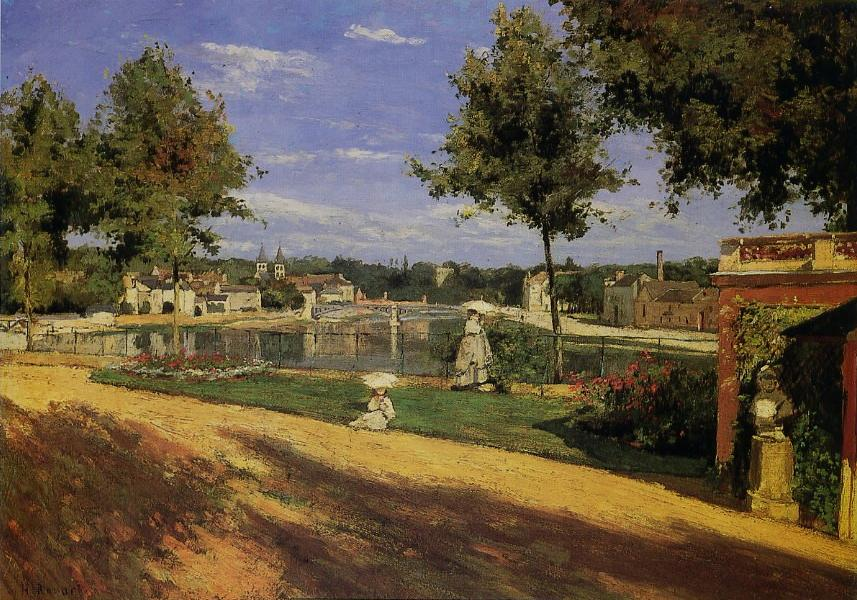
Terrace on the Banks of the Seine at Melun

Stanislas-Henri Rouart (2 October 1833, Paris – 2 January 1912, Paris) was a French engineer, industrialist, art collector and painter.

== Biography ==
His father was a wealthy manufacturer of military uniforms. He was a pupil at the Lycée Louis-le-Grand, where he became a friend of Edgar Degas. Later, he attended the École Polytechnique and studied engineering, but also took art classes. He was an artillery captain in the Franco-Prussian War, and rescued Degas during the Siege of Paris.

He was involved in numerous engineering projects, including tubes for the Paris pneumatic post, a prototype for making "artificial ice", and an engine with external fins for cooling. In his fifties, having participated in the occasional exhibition since 1868, he decided to devote himself entirely to painting. A former student of Corot and Millet, his works were largely Impressionistic in nature.

In addition to painting, he was an avid art collector and a patron of several artists, including Berthe Morisot, Toulouse-Lautrec, and Renoir, as well as his old friend, Degas. Three exhibitions of Impressionist works were held, thanks to his financial support.

In 1891, he was elected Mayor of La Queue-en-Brie, in Val-de-Marne; a position he held until his death. After almost a year following his death, his daughter and four sons decided to sell his collection. The sale brought in a huge sum, and had the effect of increasing the value of Impressionist paintings in general. One of his sons, Ernest, also became a painter.
