= Eugène Manet =

French painter (1833–1892)

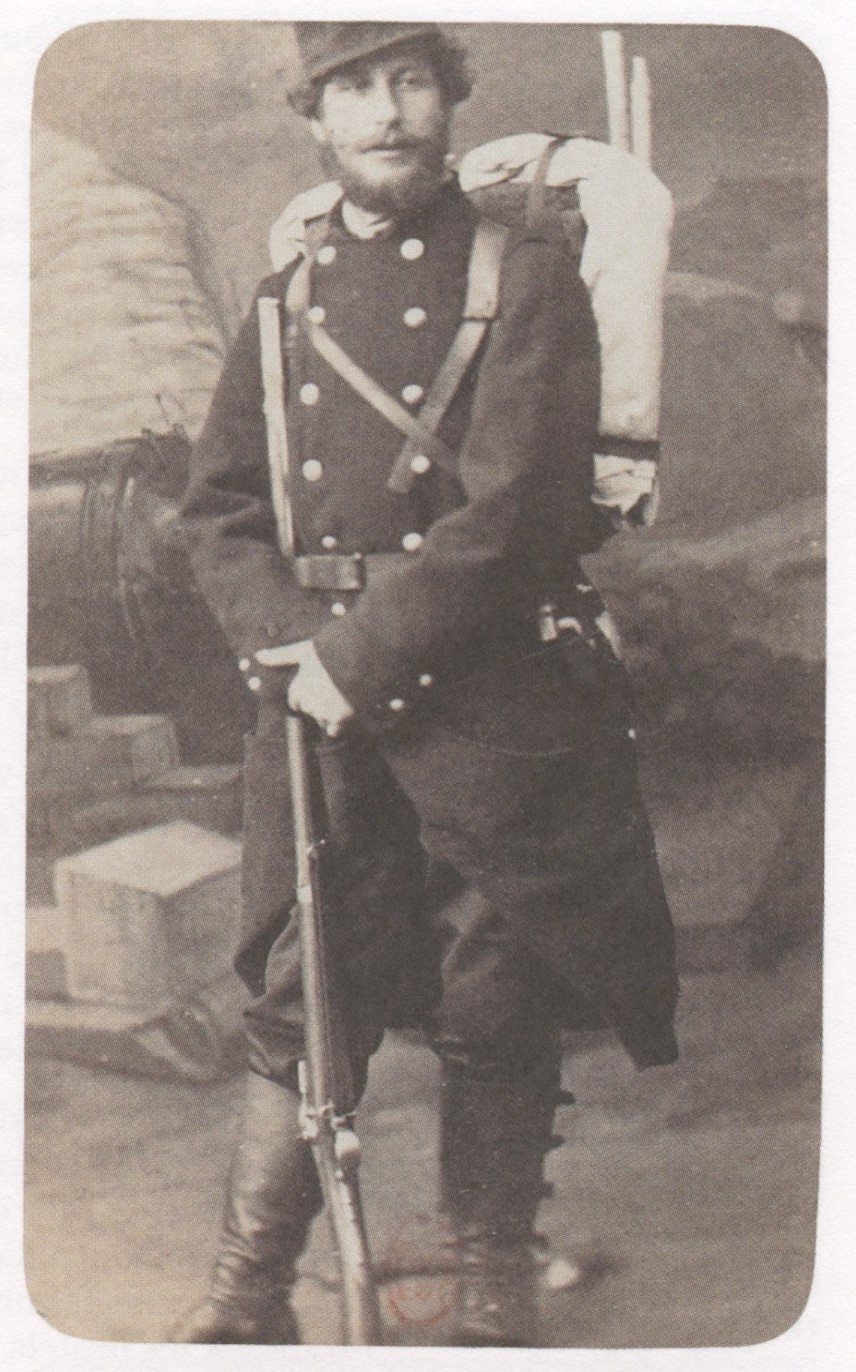
- Manet in 1870
- Born: 21 November 1833
- Died: 13 April 1892 (aged 58)
- Occupation: Painter
- Spouse: Berthe Morisot
- Relatives: Édouard Manet (brother)

Eugène Manet (French pronunciation: [øʒɛn manɛ]; 21 November 1833 – 13 April 1892) was a French painter. He did not achieve the high reputation of his older brother Édouard Manet nor that of his wife Berthe Morisot, and he devoted much of his efforts to supporting his wife's career.

== Early life ==
Manet was the middle of the three sons of Auguste Manet, an official at the French Ministry of Justice. He was born in Paris, 22 months after his older brother Édouard in January 1832, and 16 months before his younger brother Gustave in March 1835. He was named after his mother Eugénie-Désirée (née Fournier). The brothers Édouard and Eugène took piano lessons from Suzanne Leenhoff from 1849; she married Édouard in 1863.

Eugéne served in the French Army, and then studied law, but did not follow his father into a legal career. He travelled to Italy with Édouard in 1853 to study Old Master paintings in Florence, Venice, and Rome.

== Marriage to Morisot ==
Berthe Morisot developed a close relationship with Édouard Manet from 1868, but Édouard was married to his wife Suzanne, and Berthe married Édouard's brother Eugène in Passy on 22 December 1874. It has been suggested that this "was a compromise, a marriage of convenience.... But Eugéne was undoubtedly smitten by Berthe.... From Berthe's perspective ... Eugéne, most crucially, would not oblige her to stop painting.... So for both of them, a union made sense." Their wedding gift from Edgar Degas was a portrait of Eugène Manet. Manet and Morisot had one daughter, Julie Manet, future painter and art collector, born on 14 November 1878. Anne Higonnet writes:

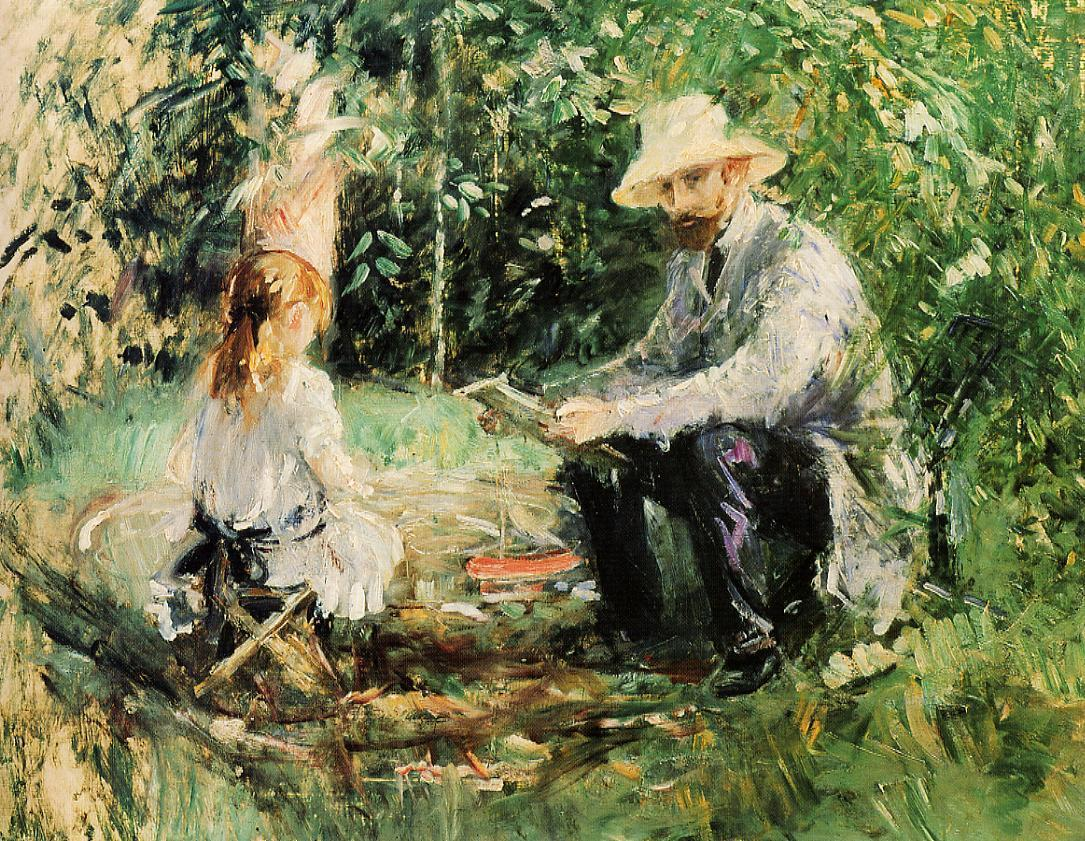
Berthe Morisot, Eugène Manet and His Daughter in the Garden, 1883

The pride [Berthe Morisot] takes in her child's Manet parentage was a theme that would recur many times. Understandably enough, for not only was Morisot in love with Eugène Manet and acutely aware of Édouard Manet's place in art history, but Julie's birth consolidated her place in the Manet family.

Manet was depicted by his brother in his painting Music in the Tuileries (1862) and was probably a model for the right male figure in Le Déjeuner sur l’herbe (1863), which has been identified as either Eugène or his dark-haired younger brother Gustave Manet and may be a composite of the two. Eugène may also be The Ragpicker — one of his brother's three paintings of Philosophers from c. 1865–1870 and was depicted with Édouard's wife Suzanne in On the Beach (1873). He was also painted several times by his wife.

== Later life ==
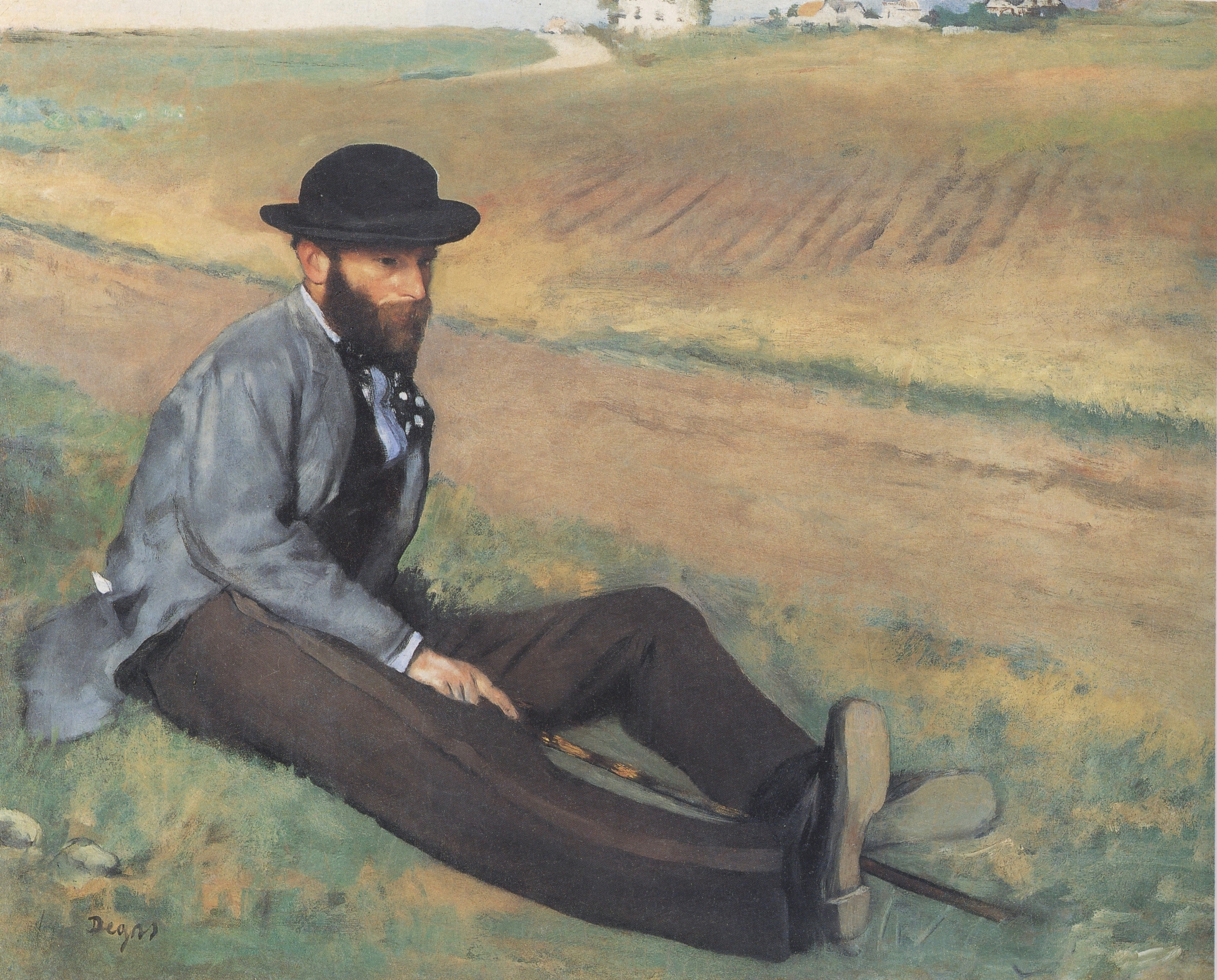
Edgar Degas, Eugène Manet, 1874

Like his brother Édouard, Eugène had Republican political sympathies. He published a semi-autobiographical novel, Victimes! (Dédié aux proscrits du 2 décembre 1851) in 1889. The hero of the novel "is called Eugène. A first-person narrator repeatedly interjects his opinions". Eugène Manet suffered from ill health from 1891 and died in Paris the following year. His wife, Morisot, died in 1895. His older brother Édouard had died in 1883 and his younger brother Gustave in 1884.

== Gallery ==
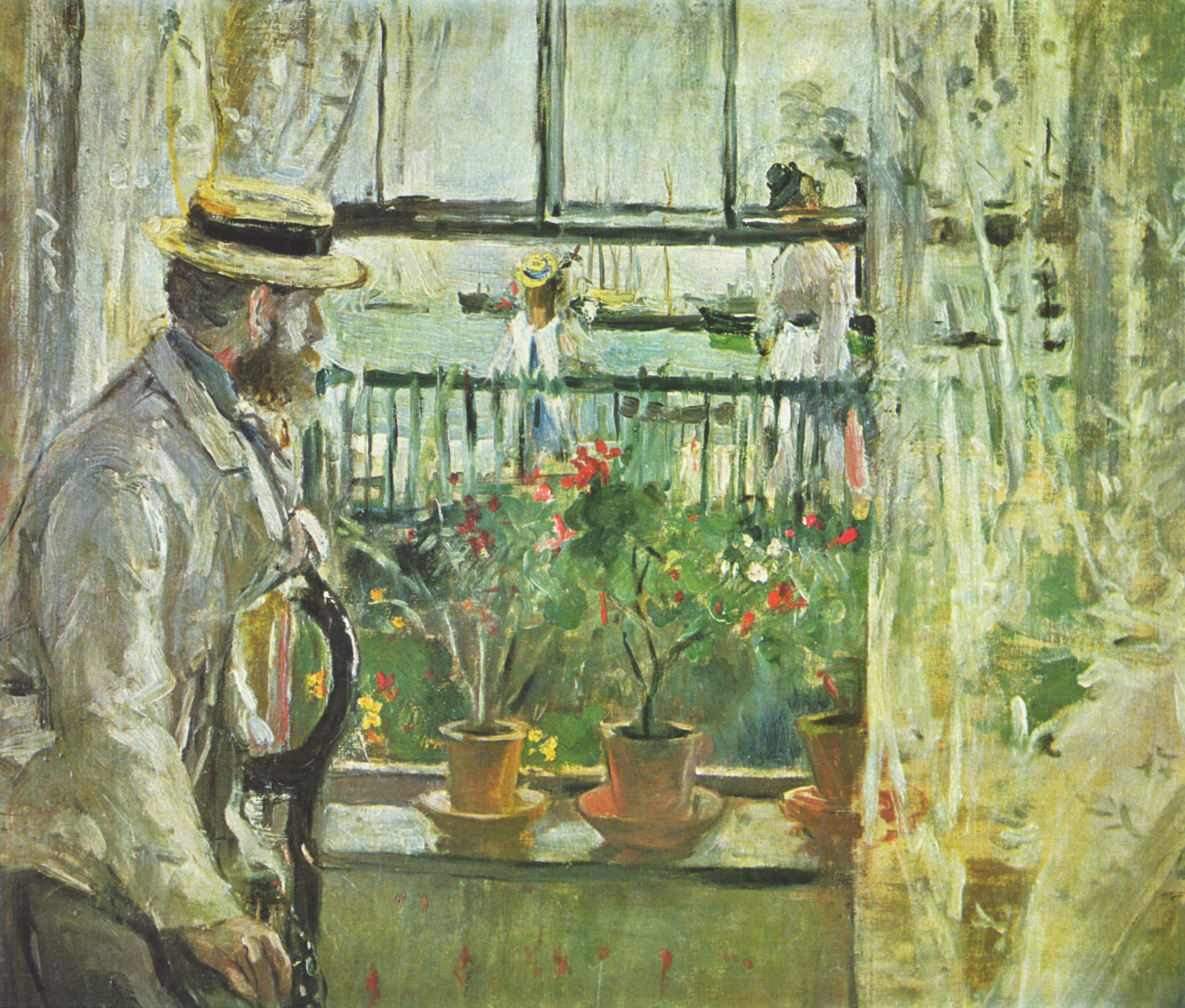
Berthe Morisot, Eugène Manet on the Isle of Wight, 1875, Musée Marmottan Monet

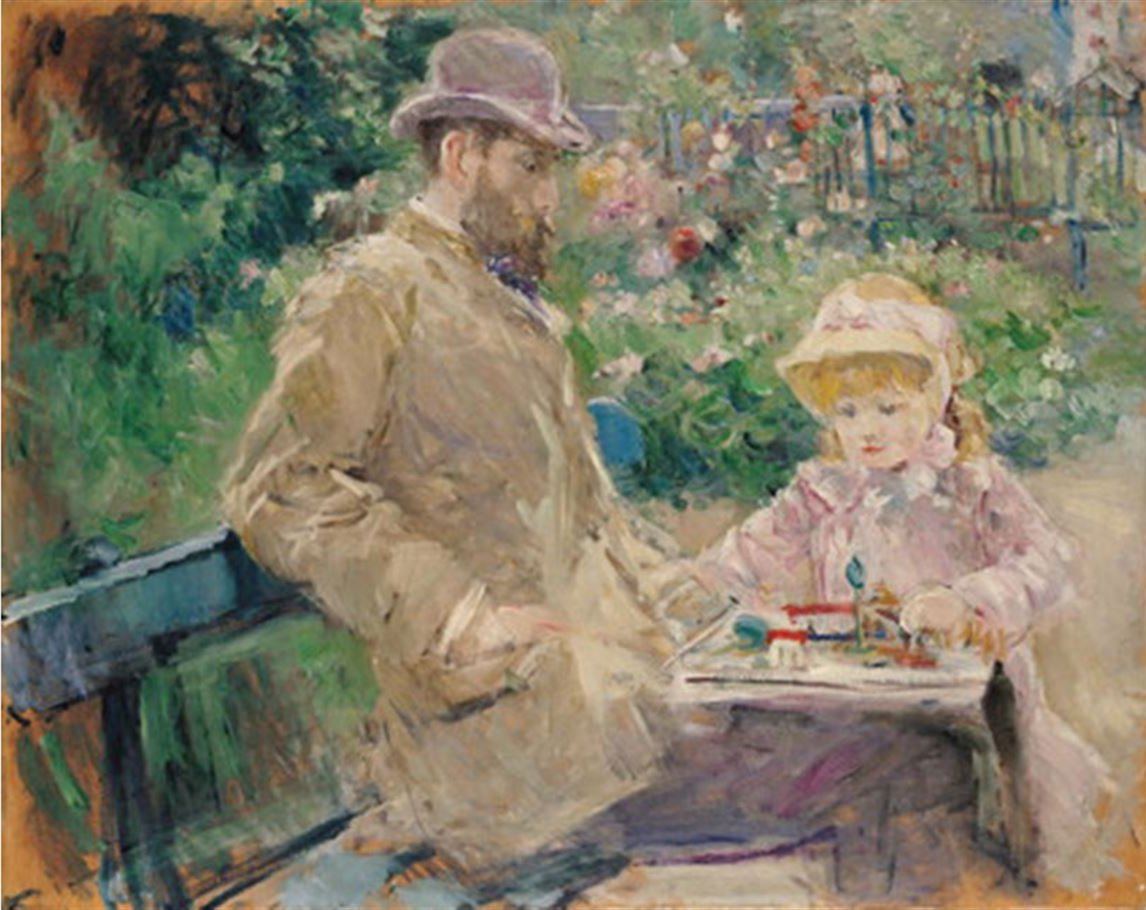
Berthe Morisot, Eugène Manet and His Daughter at Bougival, 1881

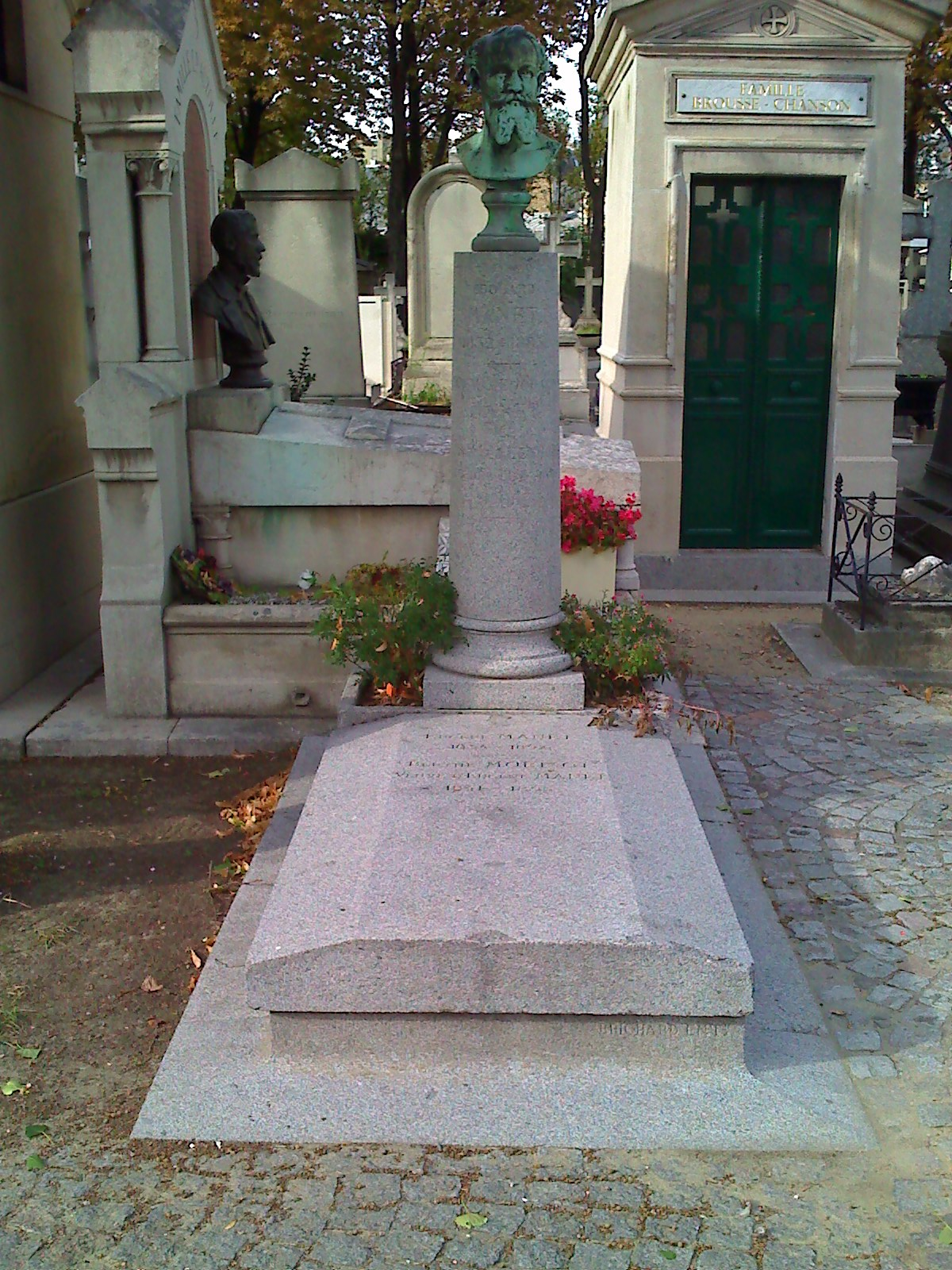
Grave of Eugène Manet and Berthe Morisot and bust of Édouard Manet in the Passy Cemetery

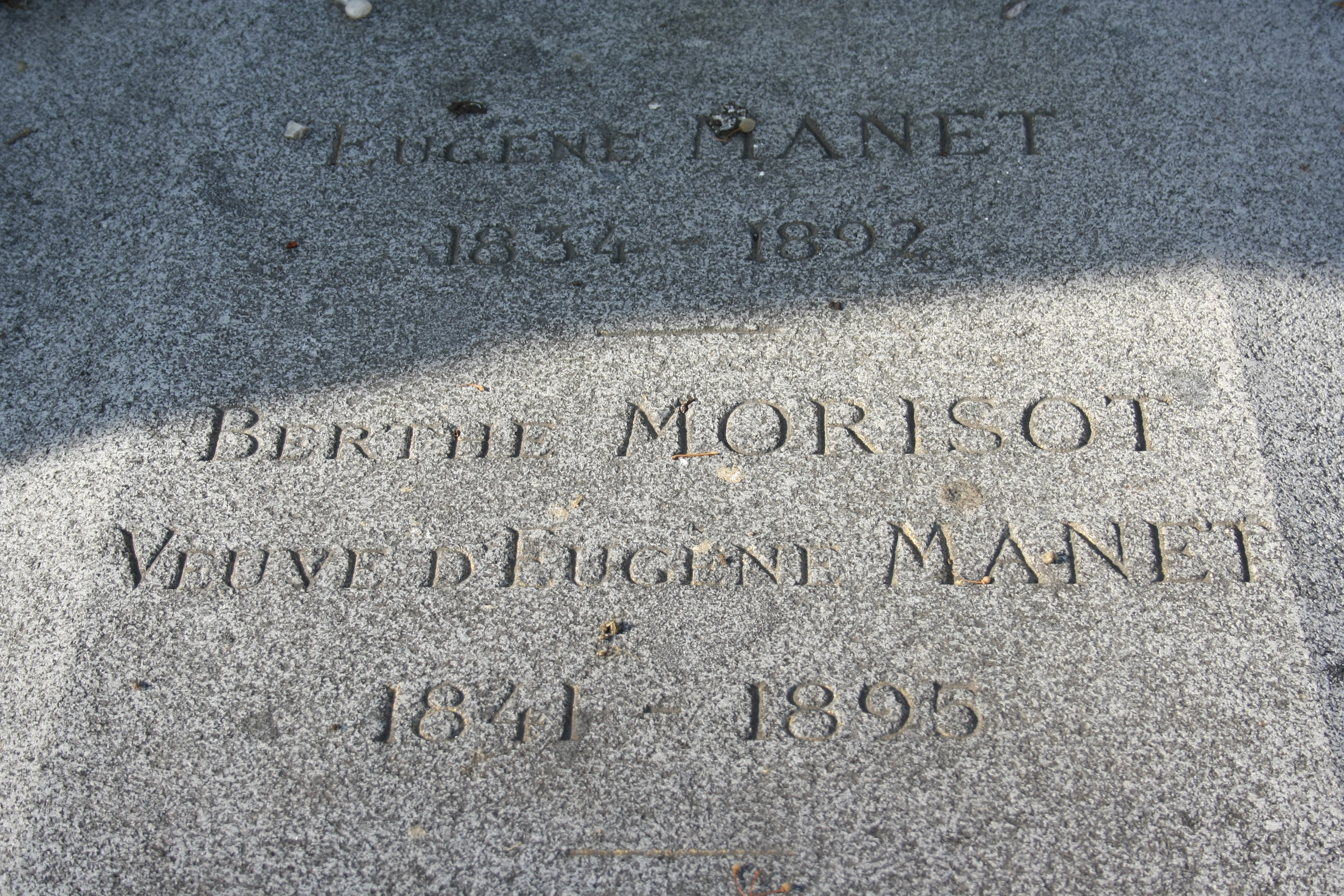
Details of gravestone

== Sources ==
- Locke, Nancy (2001). Manet and the Family Romance, Princeton University Press, pp. 54–56
