= The Mother and Sister of the Artist =

Painting by Berthe Morisot

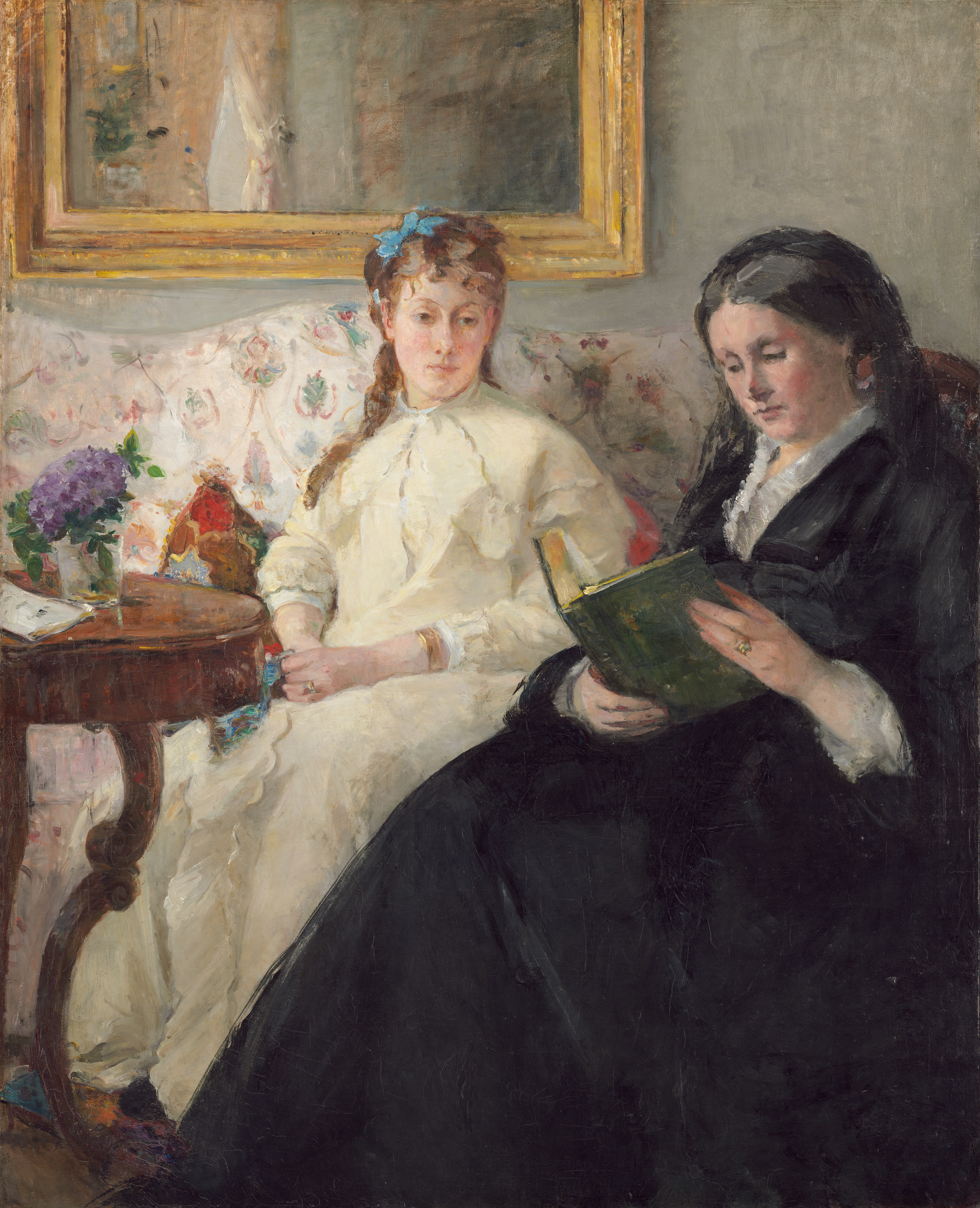
- Artist: Berthe Morisot
- Year: 1869–1870
- Medium: Oil on canvas
- Dimensions: 101 cm × 81.8 cm (40 in × 32.2 in)
- Location: National Gallery of Art, Washington, D.C.

The Mother and Sister of the Artist, also known as The Reading, is an oil-on-canvas painting by French artist Berthe Morisot, created in 1869–1870. It is exhibited at the National Gallery of Art, in Washington, D.C.

== History ==
The painting depicts Berthe Morisot's mother, Marie-Joséphine, and her favourite sister, Edma Pontillon. Since the beginning of their artistic career, the two sisters had learned their art together. However, in 1869 her sister got married and gave up painting at the insistence of her husband. In this painting, Edma was pregnant with her first child.

Unlike her friend Édouard Manet, who found it difficult to get his works accepted, Morisot was able to exhibit this painting at the Salon, along with The Harbor at Lorient, something that she was doing since 1864, and that would last until 1874, when she joined the First Impressionist Exhibition with her work, The Cradle.

This work received a positive review, despite being a "feminine painting". After her death, the work ceased to be exhibited. It was not until the middle of the 20th century that it began to interest the experts.

== Analysis ==
Two characters are depicted in the work, Edma Pontillon, Berthe's sister, and Mme. Morisot. As it was common in the painting of women artists, the subjects represented are domestic scenes or landscapes, as well as self-portraits or still life. In this case, we can see the artist's mother reading a book, an activity that gives the painting its original title, and her sister appears with a pensive expression. During this time, Edma was pregnant with her first child, and surely her thoughts were focused on the loss of having to put her married life before her devotion to painting. In one of the constant letters that she exchanged with Berthe, she wrote her: "I am often with you, dear Berthe, in spirit; I'm in your studio and I'd love to get away for just a quarter of an hour so I can breathe in the atmosphere we've lived in for years." She was trying to complement family life and art for a while, but, as she told her sister, it was impossible, as she was often too tired even to paint a small canvas. Berthe was also in a moment of crisis; despite her great personal consideration, the art world did not make it easy for women artists. She continually needed the approval of her fellow painters to feel confident in her painting. When Morisot made this work at the end of 1869, she asked fellow painter Pierre Puvis de Chavannes for advice. He only told her to work on the mother's head. Later, she told her sister: "I went to Manet's studio on Saturday (...) seeing that I was undecided, he told me enthusiastically: Tomorrow, after sending my painting, I will go see yours, and believe me: I will tell you what to do."

When, finally Manet come to visit her, Berthe describes in that same letter that he took her brushes and began to apply black on her mother's dress, a favourite colour of his, continuing on the head and even touching the background. This whole process made Berthe Morisot very angry, and she wished that they would not have accepted the painting in the salon, calling the final work a "caricature". In this way, it is explained why her work as large presence of black, a color hardly used in impressionism, but that it was common in Manet's painting. On the other hand, it can also be seen how there are two differentiated spaces between Edna and Mme. Morisot. While the first is completely illuminated by the clarity of the window, the other appears more in darkness. In addition, there is a great contrast between the young woman's pale robe and her mother's black dress. Their different attitudes, passive and active, also illustrate the difference between the two women portrayed.

The scene takes place in the living room of Morisot's parents' house. In the background there is a mirror where a curtained door is reflected. The large upholstered sofa and the wooden table show the social class to which her aristocratic family belonged.
