= Marisot =

Marisot may refer to:

- Berthe Morisot (1841–1895), French painter
- Edma Morisot (1839–1921), French painter
