= A Modern Olympia =

Painting by Paul Cézanne

- Une moderne Olympia (French)
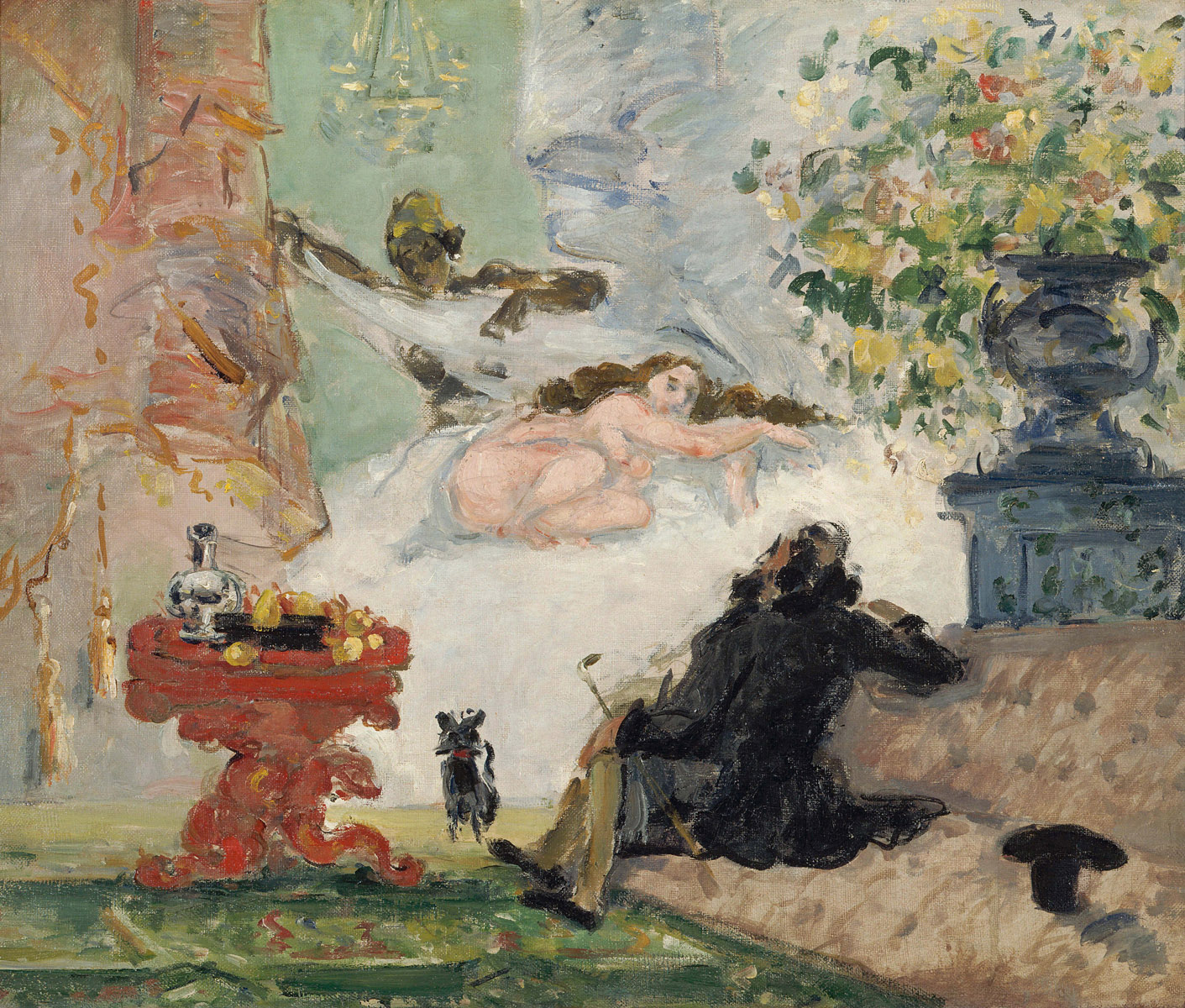
- A Modern Olympia by Paul Cézanne
- Year: c. 1873–74
- Medium: Oil on canvas
- Movement: Impressionism
- Dimensions: 46.2 cm × 55.5 cm (18.2 in × 21.9 in)
- Location: Musée d'Orsay, Paris

A Modern Olympia (French: Une moderne Olympia) is a c. 1873–74 painting by Impressionist painter Paul Cézanne. The painting's title and subject are a homage to Édouard Manet's 1863 painting Olympia.

The painting is currently owned by the Musée d'Orsay in Paris.

== Background ==
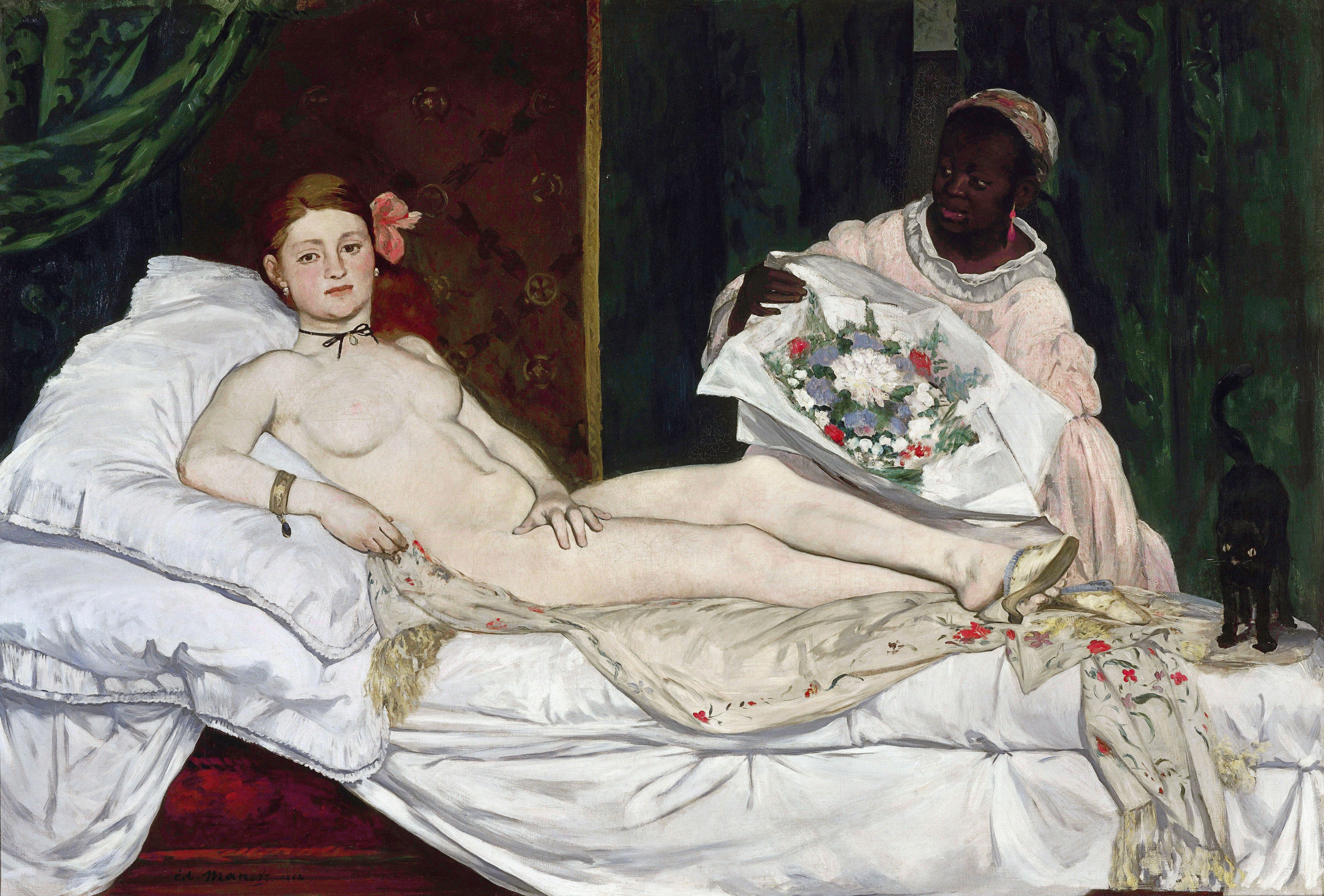
Édouard Manet, Olympia (1863)

Olympia is an 1863 oil painting by Édouard Manet which depicts a nude woman reclining on a bed while being attended to by a black maid. The painting was first exhibited at the 1865 Paris Salon, where both its subject matter and style caused a controversy.

The painting shocked the critics of the time. Typically, nude depictions of women were idealized or of mythological subjects. The name "Olympia" was associated with prostitutes in Paris in the 1860s, which suggested that woman depicted was a prostitute. Her confrontational gaze added to the scandalousness of the painting.

The painting was also criticized for its deviation from the typical academic style of painting. It was painted with broad, quick brush strokes, and contained many patches of unmixed color. The scene in the painting was lit with harsh studio lighting, which drew criticism.

== Description ==
Whereas in Manet's Olympia the courtesan's patron is only implied, in Cézanne's A Modern Olympia the cortesain's patron is depicted within the scene. The man's bald head, dark hair, full beard, and profile of the nose indicate that he is a self-portrait of Cézanne.

The animal's red collar indicates that it is a dog, despite its cat-like appearance.

A Modern Olympia has been described as anticipating the Expressionist movement that would begin about forty years later.

== History ==
Paul Cézanne painted A Modern Olympia in 1873 while living in Auvers-sur-Oise. Cézanne had previously been introduced Dr. Paul Gachet by his friend and fellow Impressionist Camille Pissarro. Dr. Gachet was a somewhat eccentric man and an amateur artist himself. He was interested in the new and revolutionary, and was also an admirer of Cézanne's paintings. Cézanne's decision to paint a homage to Édouard Manet's 1863 painting Olympia supposedly came following a conversation with Dr. Gachet. During the conversation, Gachet complimented Manet's Olympia. An unimpressed Cézanne said "What? The Olympia?... I could do that sort of thing." To which Gachet replied, "Well, do it then." Dr. Gachet bought the 1873 version of A Modern Olympia, and was reportedly present when it was painted. It was the first painting that Cézanne ever sold.

Dr. Gachet lent A Modern Olympia back to Cézanne for the First Impressionist Exhibition in 1874. Despite its small size, Cézanne's A Modern Olympia was the subject of mockery and derision by critics and visitors more-so than any of the other paintings in the exhibition.

In 1951, the heirs of Dr. Gachet donated A Modern Olympia, along with the paintings House of Dr Gachet and Delft Vase, to the Louvre in Paris.

== Other versions ==
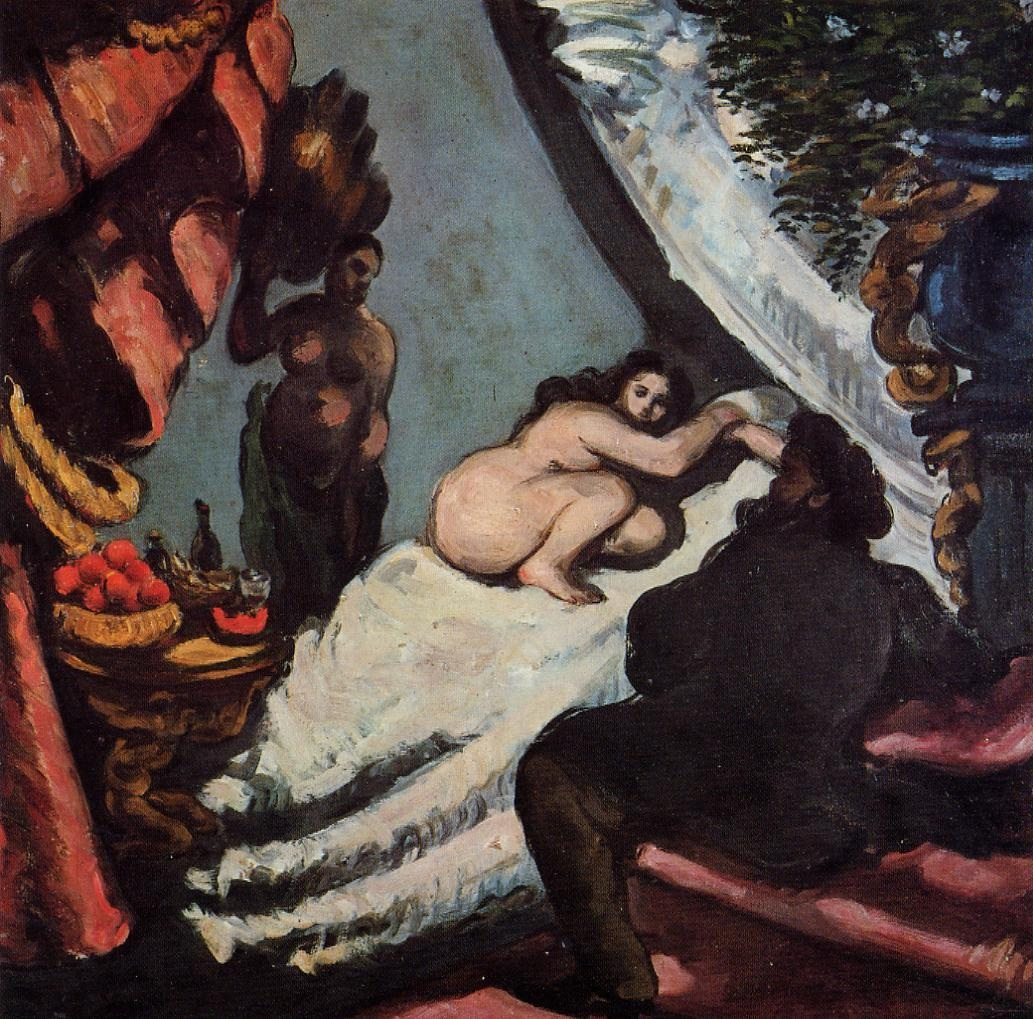
Paul Cézanne's earlier version of A Modern Olympia (The Pasha), c. 1869–70, Private collection.

Cézanne had previously painted another version of A Modern Olympia three years earlier in c. 1869–70. This earlier version is also known as The Pasha.

Cézanne also created another homage to Manet's Olympia in c. 1877. This graphite and watercolor drawing is simply titled Olympia.

=== Copies by other artists ===
Several other copies of A Modern Olympia were made by contemporary artists. Dr. Paul Gachet, the painting's first owner, made at least two copies of his own: one in pen and ink, and another in oil on canvas. The artist Blanche Derousse, a pupil of Dr. Gachet, also made two copies at Dr. Gachet's request: one in watercolor, and another in drypoint.

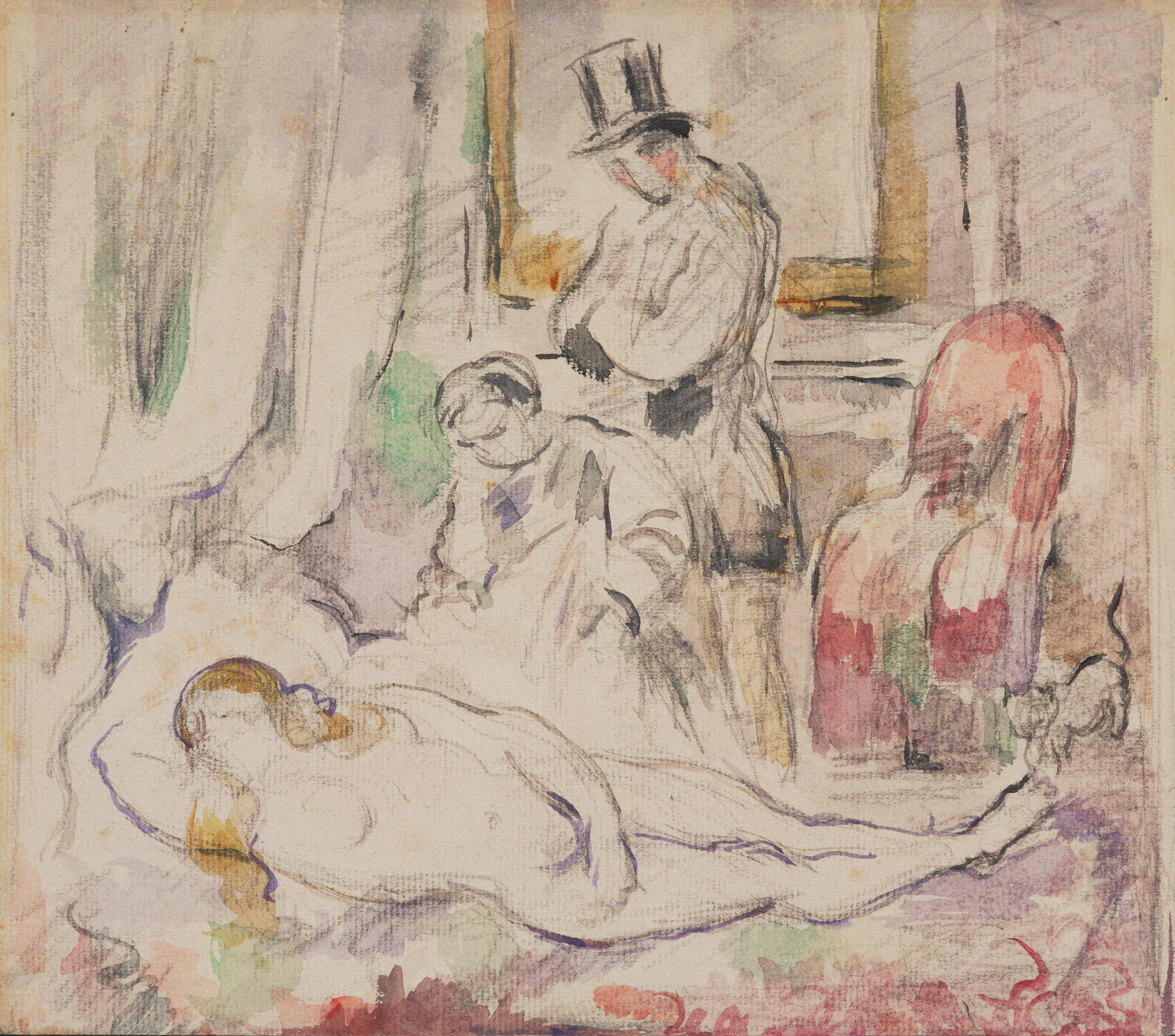
Paul Cézanne, Olympia.
Graphite and watercolor, (c. 1877).
Philadelphia Museum of Art, Philadelphia, Pennsylvania.

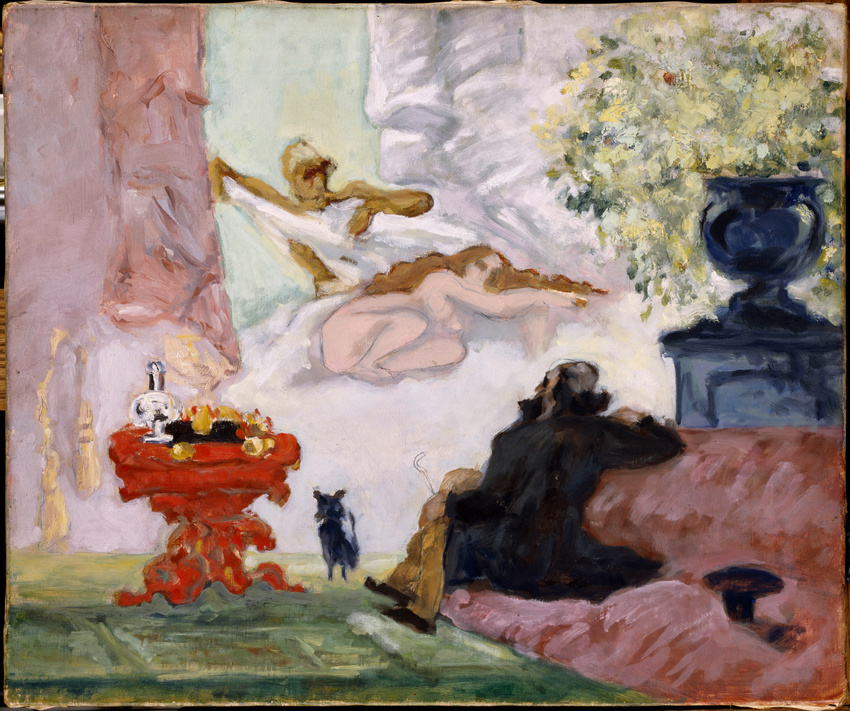
Paul Gachet, Copy after Cézanne's A Modern Olympia.
Oil on canvas, (Date unknown).
Musée d'Orsay, Paris, France.

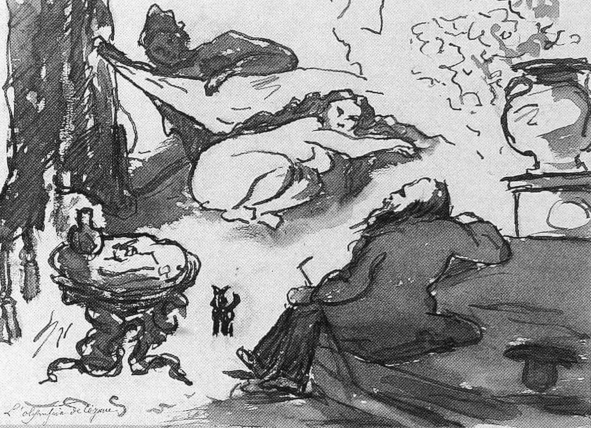
Paul Gachet, Copy after Cézanne's A Modern Olympia.
Pen and ink, (Date unknown).
Van Gogh Museum, Amsterdam, Netherlands.

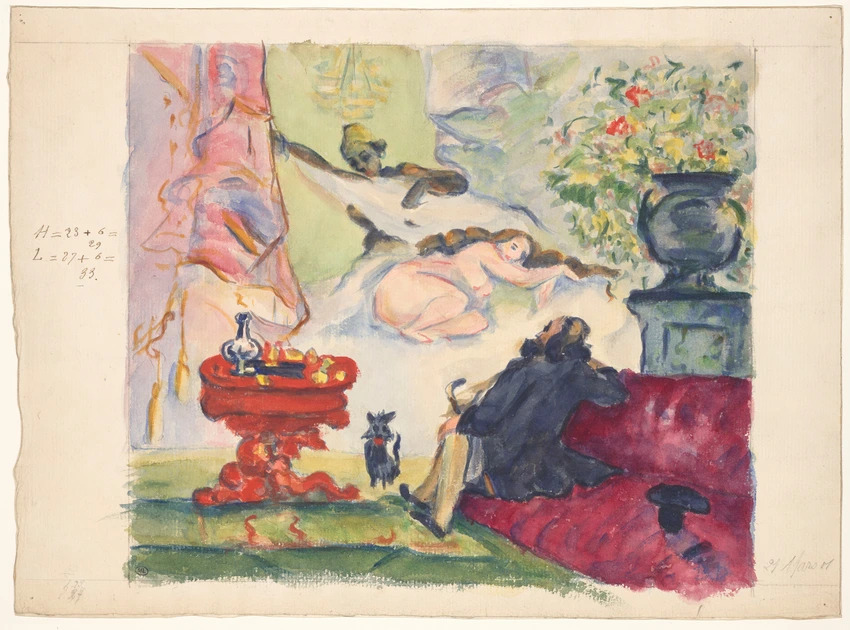
Blanche Derousse, Copy after Cézanne's A Modern Olympia.
Watercolor, (1901).
Musée d'Orsay, Paris, France.

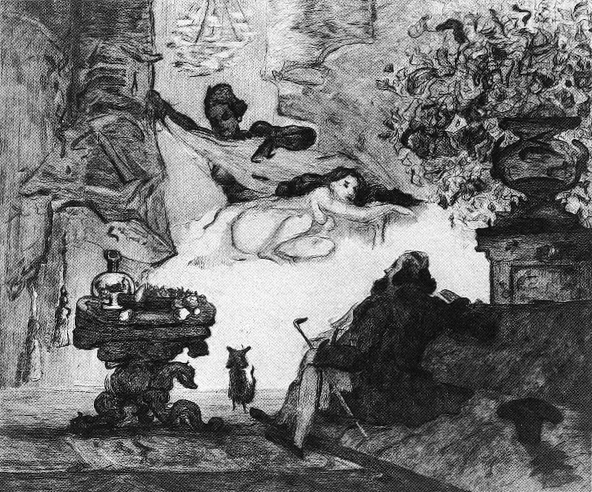
Blanche Derousse, Copy after Cézanne's A Modern Olympia.
Drypoint, (1907).
Van Gogh Museum, Amsterdam, Netherlands.

== See also ==
- List of paintings by Paul Cézanne
- The Hanged Man's House – Another painting by Paul Cézanne that was painted in Auvers-sur-Oise and exhibited at the First Impressionist Exhibition.
