= The Cradle (Morisot) =

Painting by Berthe Morisot

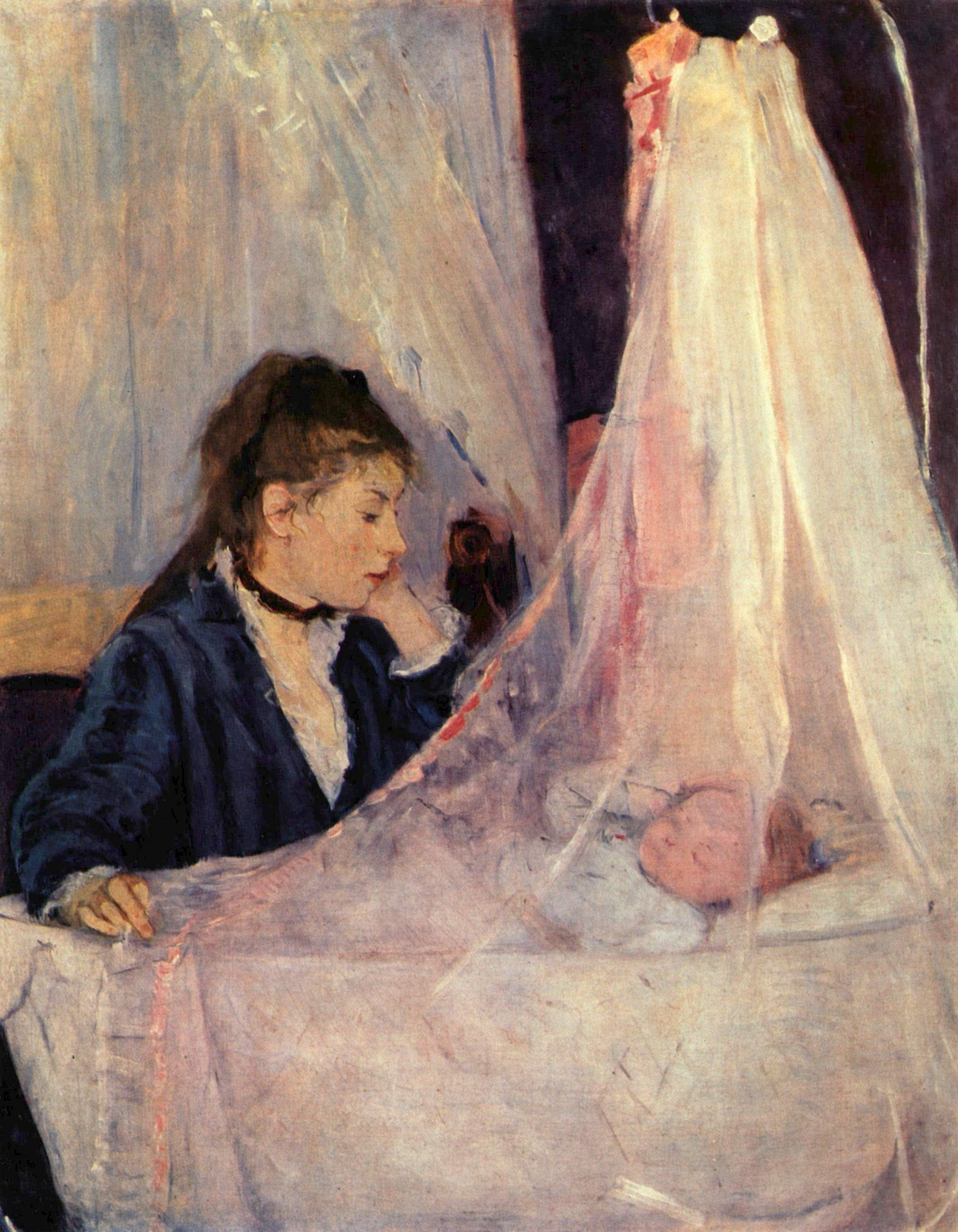
- Artist: Berthe Morisot
- Year: 1872
- Medium: Oil on canvas
- Dimensions: 56 cm × 46 cm (22 in × 18 in)
- Location: Musée d'Orsay; Paris

The Cradle is an oil on canvas painting by the French Impressionist painter Berthe Morisot, executed in 1872. It is on display at the Musée d'Orsay in Paris.

== History ==
Morisot painted her sister Edma Portillon, who is watching over her sleeping daughter Blanche. The painting was exhibited for the first time in the First Impressionist Exhibition, opened on April 15, 1874, in the former studio of the photographer Nadar, on the Parisian Boulevard des Capucines. Although some critics praised the painting for its grace and beauty, it did not attract much interest and Morisot failed to sell it. Morisot had set the price at 800 francs. The work remained subsequently in the family collection, passing into the hands of Blanche Portillon, the painter's niece and model of the sleeping baby. In 1930 it was acquired by the Louvre Museum. Between 1947 and 1986, it was exhibited at the Jeu de Paume, located in the Jardin des Tuileries and owned by the Louvre, where the main works of impressionism were brought together. After the creation of the Musée d'Orsay, it was moved there.

== Analysis ==
The current painting constitutes the first representation of the theme of motherhood in Morisot's work, which the artist would later regularly cultivate. The canvas reveals the influence of Édouard Manet, a painter whom Morisot had met at the Louvre in 1868 and whose brother Eugène Manet she married in 1874. The composition of the painting is based on the diagonal formed by the gaze of the mother towards her sleeping daughter and the fabric of the crib in which she sleeps. The diagonal is reinforced by the left bent arm of the mother, to which the small arm, also bent, of the baby responds.

Morisot uses in this painting a reduced number of colors and a fluid brushstroke. The painting reflects an atmosphere of great intimacy, sweetness and protective love. This canvas, together with others like the one Claude Monet made of his son, Jean Monet at his Cradle (1867), attempts a new representation of childhood.

Regarding the title, The Cradle, when comparing it with other paintings that represented sleeping children also exhibited at the Official Salon, Dominique Lobstein states that "before perhaps contributing to an aesthetic revolution, this painting participates in a rhetorical evolution: Morisot abandons all anecdotal picturesqueness and the title take on a tasteful simplicity, intended to immediately inform the viewer of the content of the work and allow him to project himself as in his own daily life".
