= Louis Latouche =

French painter

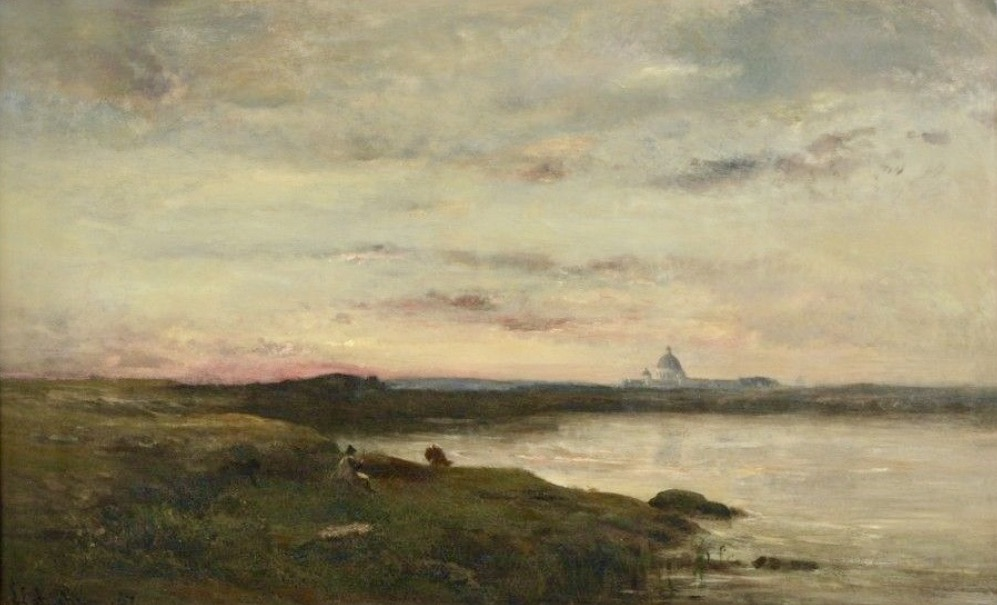
Louis Latouche (1829-1884) Bord de mer, Oil on canvas (lined), 51 x 81 cm, signed lower left

Louis Latouche (20 September 1829 – 24 August 1883) was a French painter, pigment dealer, framer and art dealer, notable as a defender of Impressionism. He was born in La Ferté-sous-Jouarre and died in hospital at Saint-Dié-des-Vosges.

He was a friend and supplier to several painters, dealing with them via his wife. Their shop was at the corner of rue Laffitte and rue La Fayette in Paris. Their clients and friends included Camille Pissarro, Paul Gachet and Amand Gautier, with whom he often went to Berck. He supported them, exhibiting their work and letting them meet in his home in the evenings- it was there that they originated the idea of a 'salon des refusés', supported by Alfred Sisley, Camille Pissarro, Frédéric Bazille and Auguste Renoir, who lodged an unsuccessful petition for such a salon in 1867 in contrast to the official Salon of 1867.

Louis Latouche was sometimes called ‘Père Latouche’, in reference to Père Tanguy and another art dealer, Père Martin (Pierre Firmin Martin, 1817-1891), who was a neighbour in Rue Laffitte.

When Louis Latouche died in 1883, his wife continued to run the business alone until 1887. The Impressionists, such as Paul Gauguin and Vincent van Gogh, had their paintings stretched and framed by Latouche. When Vincent went to his brother Theo's gallery, he would pass by the corner of Rue Laffitte and Rue Lafayette.

== Bibliography (in French) ==
- Sophie Monneret, L'Impressionnisme et son époque, vol. 2, t. 1, Paris, Robert Laffont, 1987a, 997 p. (ISBN 978-2-221-05412-3)
- Sophie Monneret, L'Impressionnisme et son époque, vol. 2, t. II, Paris, 1987b, 1185 p. (ISBN 978-2-221-05413-0)
- Lionello Venturi, Les Archives de l'impressionnisme, Paris, Durand-Ruel, 1939, 410 p.
- Gérald Schurr, Les petits maîtres de la peinture, 1820-1920, valeur de demain, vol. 7, t. IV, Paris, Éditions de l’amateur, 1979 (OCLC 417341878)
