= The Hanged Man's House =

Painting by Paul Cézanne

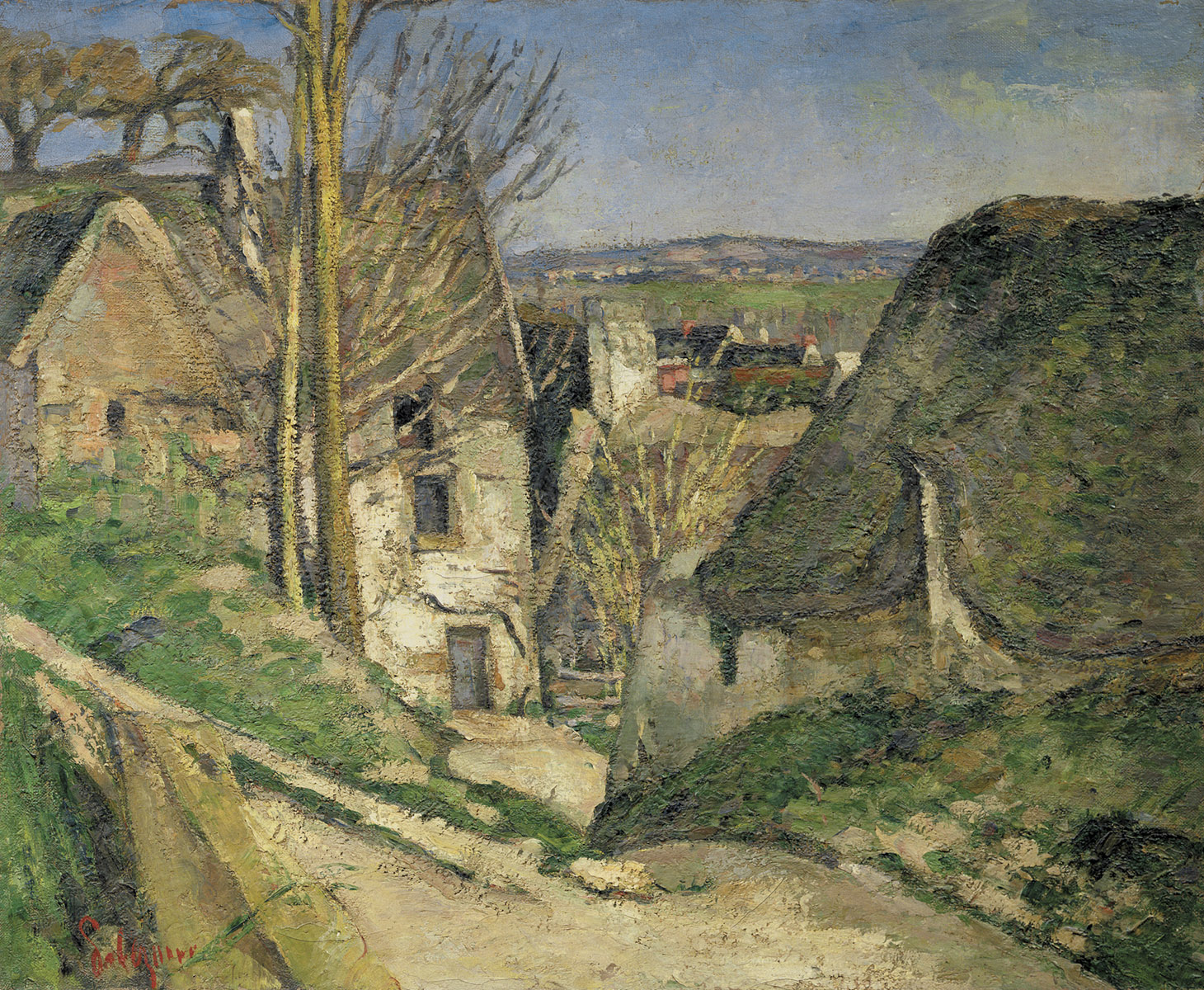
- Artist: Paul Cézanne
- Year: 1873
- Medium: Oil on canvas
- Dimensions: 55 cm × 66 cm (22 in × 26 in)
- Location: Musée d'Orsay, Paris

The Hanged Man's House (in French: La Maison du pendu, Auvers-sur-Oise) is an oil-on-canvas painting by the French Post-Impressionist artist Paul Cézanne, from 1873. It is held at the Musée d'Orsay, in Paris.

== Background ==
The Hanged Man's House was presented at the First Impressionist Exhibition in 1874 and was the first painting that Cézanne sold to a collector. The village depicted in the painting is Auvers-sur-Oise, 27 km north of Paris.

== Description ==
The Hanged Man's House is an oil painting on canvas that measures 55 cm x 66 cm and is signed by Cézanne on the bottom left in red paint. It displays a landscape with a complicated composition. The scene presents an atmosphere of solitude, due to the absence of people and the use of a cool colour palette. From the central point of the painting, there are several axes, including two paths leading to the centre and the left, a bench on the left and the branches of a tree leading to the top of the painting. Cézanne had been heavily influenced by his friend Camille Pissarro and as a result, used grainy, broken brushstrokes and pale colours used by the Impressionists. In this composition, Cézanne challenged the conventions of art by making deliberate imperfections of perspective. The inaccuracies can be seen in the angle of the path that leads to the left and the bank on the right.

== See also ==
- List of paintings by Paul Cézanne
