= Léopold Levert =

French painter

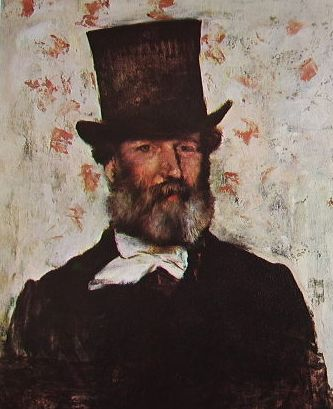
Portrait of the French painter Léopold Levert made by his friend Edgar Degas (1874)

Jean-Baptiste Léopold Levert (11 October 1819 – 24 July 1882) was a French landscape artist, printmaker, engraver, and designer. He began as a genre painter but joined the Impressionists in their first exhibition in 1874. Although his work appears in the catalogs of the exhibitions, most of it has been lost and no trace of the work that was exhibited survives.

He started his career as a draftsman of military uniforms, but encouraged by his friend Edgar Degas he turned to landscape painting . He was friends with Henri Rouart and Eugène Rouart. Henri Rouart was also a friend of Degas and an enthusiastic participant in the exhibitions of the Impressionists. Léopold Levert would also participate in the exhibitions at the invitation of Degas. Levert participated in four of the eight Impressionist exhibitions, specifically in the first (1874), the second (1876), the third (1877) and the fifth (1880).

== Work ==
- Les Bords de l'Essonne
- Le Moulin de Touviaux
- Près d' Auvers
- Vue de Portrieux
- Plage de Portrieux
- La Jetée de Portrieux
- Port de Portrieux
- Bords de l'Essonne
- Maison à Vauldray
- La ferme de Saint Marc
- Vue prize à Buttier
- Les chemins à Noiseau
- Paysage du Limousin
- Étude à Malesherbes
- Route sur le plateau de Fontenay
- Sabonnière de Fontainebleau
- Étude de forêt
- Moulin de Touviaux
- Les Bords de l'Essonne
- Chaumières à Carteret
- Plaine à Barbizon
- Une plâtrière à Fontenay
- Plaine de la Brie
- Cadre d'eaux fortes
