= Edma Morisot =

French painter

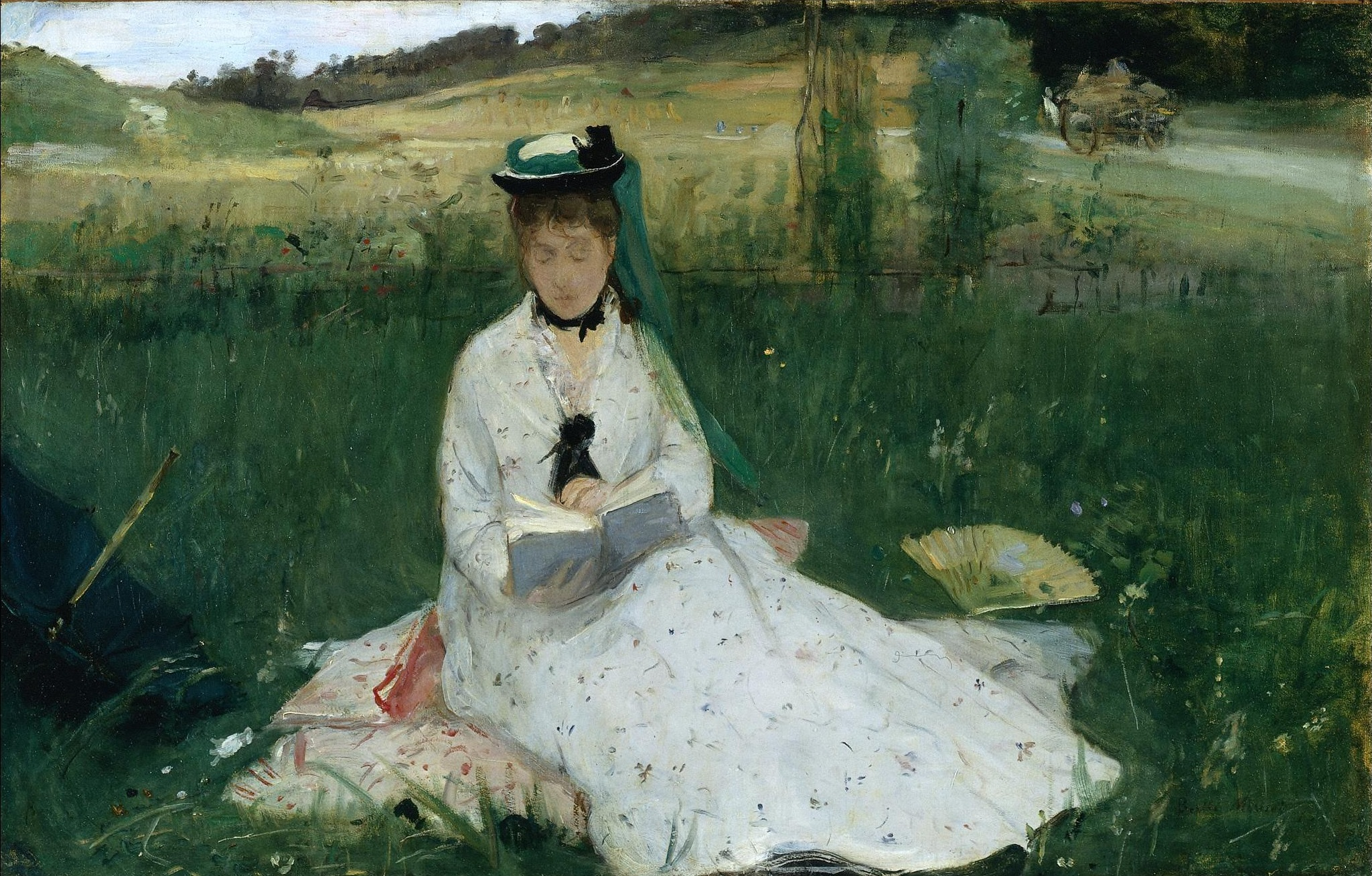
- Painting of the artist's sister, Edma Morisot by Berthe Morisot
- Born: 13 December 1839; Valenciennes, France
- Died: 2 May 1921; Paris, France
- Known for: Painting
- Movement: Impressionism
- Spouse: Adolphe Pontillon (m. 1869)

Edma Morisot (English: /mɒriːˈzoʊ/ mor-ee-ZOH, French: [ɛdma mɔʁizo]; Marie Edma Caroline Morisot-Pontillon; 13 December 1839 – 2 May 1921) was a French artist and the older sister of the Impressionist painter Berthe Morisot.

== Early life and education ==
Edma Morisot was born in 1839 in Valenciennes, France. Brought up largely in Paris, Edma Morisot received a bourgeois education, like her sisters Yves and Berthe, that included piano and drawing. All three sisters were encouraged to pursue drawing by their mother, who had them first study with the neoclassical painter Geoffroy Alphonse Chocane in 1857. Edma and Berthe both wanted to pursue their training further, which led them to take lessons under the well-regarded painter Joseph Guichard, a former student of Jean-Auguste-Dominique Ingres. According to Armand Forreau's 1925 biography of Berthe Morisot, Guichard is said to have warned their mother:

"With natures like those of your daughters my teaching will not confer the meagre talent of genteel accomplishment, they will become painters. Do you have any idea what that means? In your milieu of the grande bourgeoisie it would be a revolution."

Guichard encouraged the young women to copy paintings at the Louvre, which the two women visited chaperoned by their mother. There, they met the artist Félix Bracquemond in 1859, who introduced them to Henri Fantin-Latour. The Morisot sisters soon tired of copying the old masters, and in 1860 they began to study with the Barbizon painter Jean-Baptiste Camille Corot, who taught them to paint en plein air. In 1863, when Corot became too busy to continue to instruct them, Edma and Berthe came under the tutelage of another Barbican painting, Achille François Oudinot. The sisters later broke with Oudinot on acrimonious terms, and they later referred to Corot. as their teacher who introduced them to several artists including Edouard Manet.

== Career ==
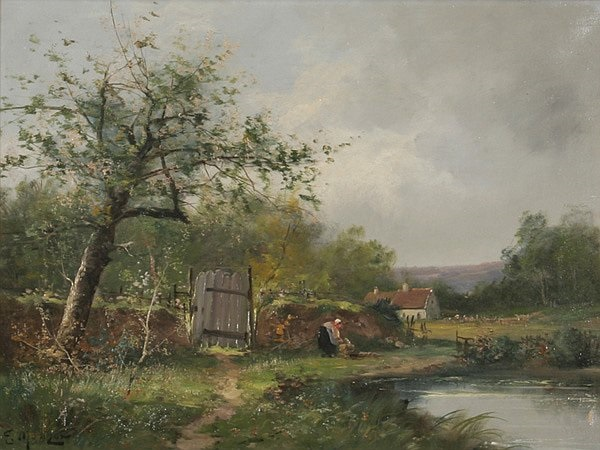
Spring Landscape with Peasant on a Pond by Edma Morisot

Edma's landscape paintings were strongly influenced by the Barbizon style of her instructors, such as Corot. She painted numerous landscapes, but in 1863 she also turned to portraiture. That year, she painted a remarkable portrait of her sister Berthe (now in a private collection), which shows her concentrating in front of her canvas.

In 1864 she submitted two paintings to the annual Salon, both of which were accepted. She also submitted paintings that were accepted in 1865, 1866, 1867, and 1868. In 1867 Edma also sent three paintings to a provincial exhibition in Bordeaux, one of many organised by the Friends of Art societies. The sisters sold, or at least tried to sell, paintings through Alfred Cadart. Her paintings, which now reside in private collections, largely comprise landscapes and portraits.

Julian Barnes wrote, "[O]nly two pictures by Edma survive. At some point, and with what motivation we can only guess, [Edma] destroyed all her work except for [the portrait of Berthe] and a landscape."

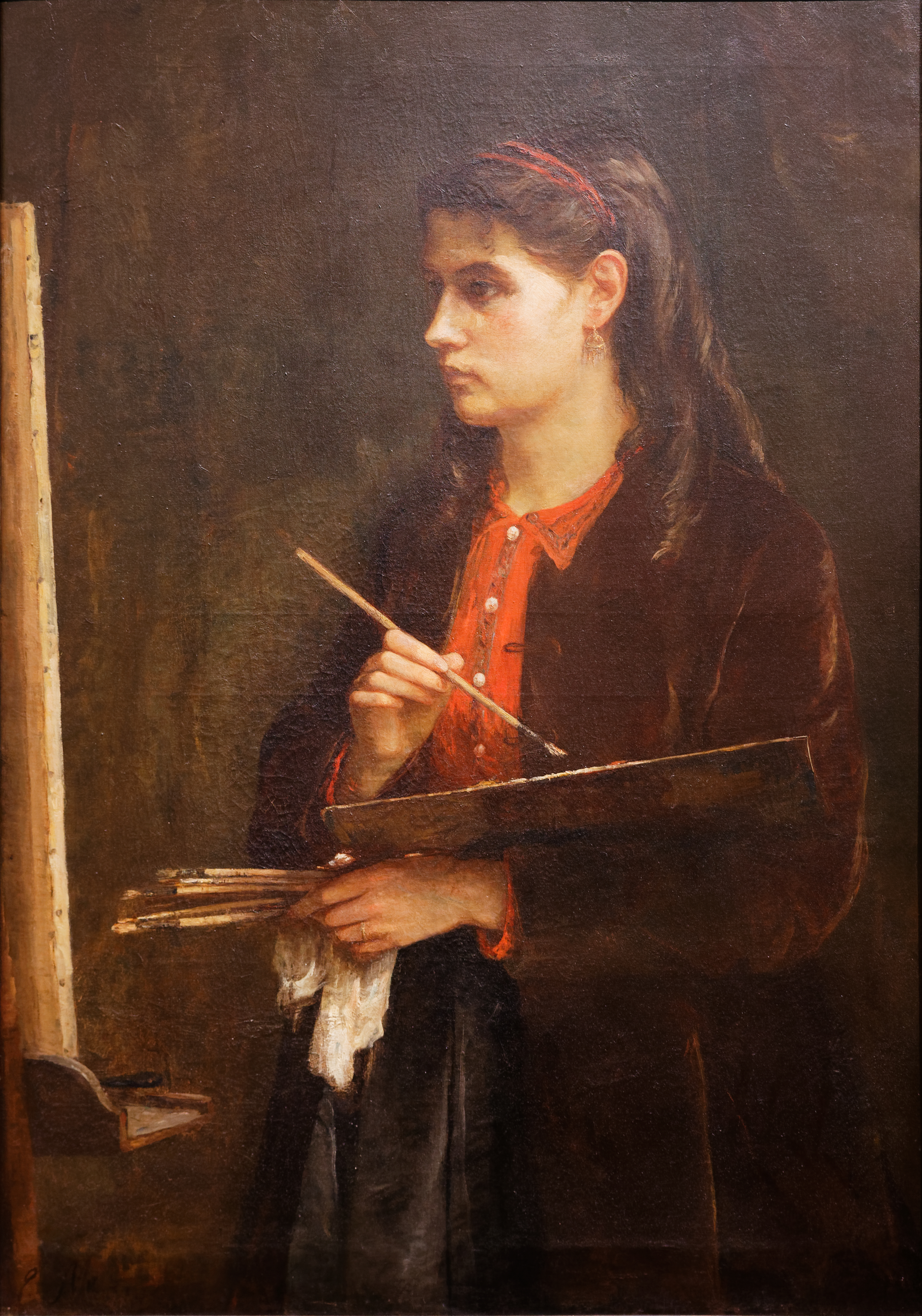
Portrait of the Artist's Sister by Edma Morisot (1863)

=== Relationship with Berthe Morisot ===
The two sisters were close in their youth, supporting and constructively critiquing each other as they developed as painters. "In her crucial, formative years," Berthe "depended most of all on her sister. Behind Berthe Morisot was Edma Morisot." A portrait of Berthe by Edma, from 1863, is probably the earliest surviving picture of Berthe. The two sisters were known to travel together, exhibit together, and often painted side by side. The two women, best friends and companions for 12 years, keenly felt the separation brought about by Edma's marriage. In their mature years, her role as confidant and supporter in Berthe's life was replaced by Eugène Manet, the brother of Édouard Manet, whom Berthe married in 1874.

Throughout her life Edma often modelled for her sister's paintings, and can be seen in the following works:

- Edma Morisot lisant, 1867 (Cleveland museum of art)
- Portrait de M^{me} Pontillon, 1869 (National Gallery of Art, Washington, DC
- Portrait de M^{me} Pontillon née Edma Morisot, sœur de l'artiste8, 1871 (Musée d'Orsay, Paris)
- Le berceau, 1872 (Musée d'Orsay): the painting depicts Edma near the cradle of her daughter Blanche
- Chasse aux papillons, 1874 (Musée d'Orsay): the characters depicted are Edma and her daughters Jeanne and Blanche

== Later life ==
On 8 March 1869, Edma married Adolphe Pontillon, a naval officer and long-time friend of Édouard Manet. The couple moved to Lorient in Brittany. Edma's career as an artist effectively ceased following her marriage. She painted a portrait of her husband and executed some pastel copies of Berthe's work, but other artistic production during her marriage remains unknown. Edma died in Paris in 1921.

== Legacy ==
Edma Morisot was included in the 2018 exhibit Women in Paris 1850-1900.
