= The Harbor at Lorient =

Painting by Berthe Morisot (1869)

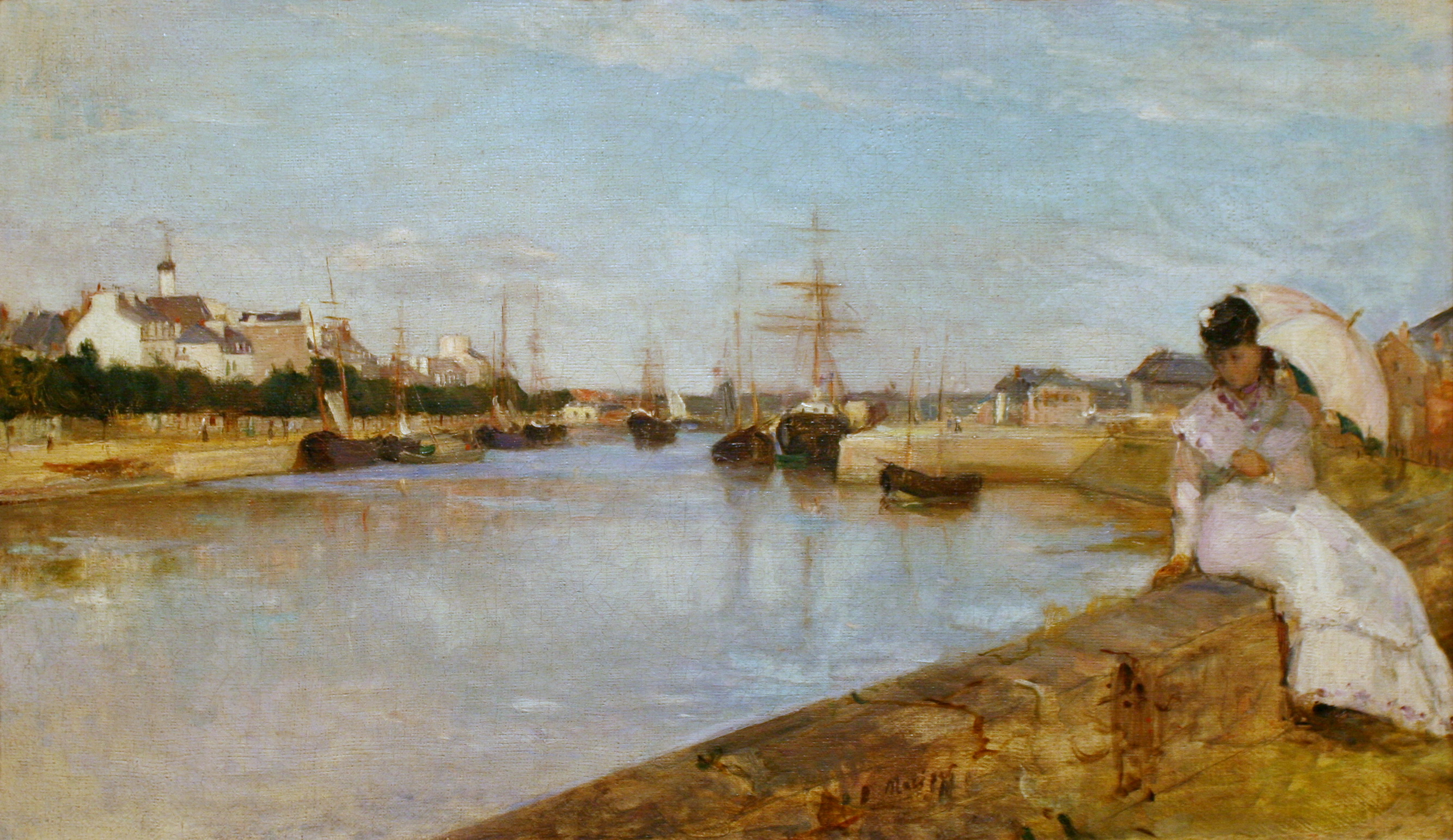
- Artist: Berthe Morisot
- Year: 1869
- Medium: Oil on canvas
- Dimensions: 43.5 cm × 73 cm (17.1 in × 29 in)
- Location: National Gallery of Art, Washington, D.C.

The Harbor at Lorient is an oil-on-canvas painting by French artist Berthe Morisot, executed in 1869. The painting has the dimensions of 43.5 by 73 cm. It is held at the National Gallery of Art, in Washington, D.C.

== History ==
Morisot traveled to Brittany several times in the years preceding the creation of this work. Since the arrival of the railway, the region welcomed painters to Pont-Aven, mainly during summer, and Morisot went there, as well as the nearby towns Douarnenez and Quimperlé in 1866 and 1867.

The artist arrived in Lorient in June 1869, and spent two months there. During this period, she painted two canvases featuring her sister, Edma. The latter married the same year naval officer Adolphe Pontillon who was attached to this port.

On her return to Paris, Morisot offered this painting to Édouard Manet. The latter was impressed by the mastery shown by Morisot, and he started considering her as a talented artist. It was from this moment on that Manet occasionally began consulting Morisot for artistic questions. On his advice, she repeatedly retouched the face and the bottom of Edma's dress.

== Description ==
The rectangular canvas depicts Morisot's sister seated on a parapet, under a parasol, bordering the outer port of Lorient. The sky and its clouds are reflected in the sea. Edma's outfit consist of a dress and a parasol. Both are white in color, speckled with pink and mauve. The representation of a figure in full light by the impressionist painters passes by simplification, using a few touches of paints. Morisot accentuates this technique by having her sister pose in an essentially white outfit. The integration of a female figure (like her other relatives, her sister, her niece, or her daughter Julie on other canvases) with a vaporous and silvery landscape as a background, and highlighting their freshness, is a usual theme of Morrisot, which is found in this painting.

Fishing boats are moored on these quays, and the whole harbor is drawn in brown and gray tones. It is bordered by the sky and the sea whose close colors recall each other. Morisot created this canvas from the Quai de Rohan, taking the Quai des Indes as a frame, with the Tour de la Découverte visible on the upper left part of the painting.

== Property ==
The painting was first the property of fellow painter Édouard Manet, to whom Berthe Morisot offered it in 1869. It subsequently changed hands, and was reported as belonging to financier Gabriel Thomas, a cousin of Berthe Morisot, in 1896 . The latter's wife kept it at least until 1941. It was subsequently owned by Edward Molyneux in 1952, then acquired by sale on 15 August 1955, by Ailsa Mellon Bruce. It was bequeathed to the National Gallery of Art, in Washington, D. C., in 1970 upon her death.
