= 1872 in art =

Events from the year 1872 in art.

== Events ==
- February 20 – The Metropolitan Museum of Art opens in New York City.
- May 5 – The Royal Academy Exhibition of 1872 begins at Burlington House in London
- June – American-born painter James McNeill Whistler exhibits Arrangement in Grey and Black: The Artist's Mother, painted the previous year, at the 104th Royal Academy summer exhibition in London after the curator Sir William Boxall threatens to resign from the R.A. if it is rejected.
- November 13 (07:35) (probable date) – Claude Monet begins painting Impression, Sunrise (Impression, soleil levant) as viewed from his hotel room at Le Havre.
- November – Edward Lear acquires his cat Foss.
- date unknown
  - William De Morgan sets up an art pottery in Chelsea, London.
  - The first "Wallace fountains", to the design of sculptor Charles-Auguste Lebourg, are installed in Paris.
  - Lise Tréhot last models for Renoir.

== Works ==
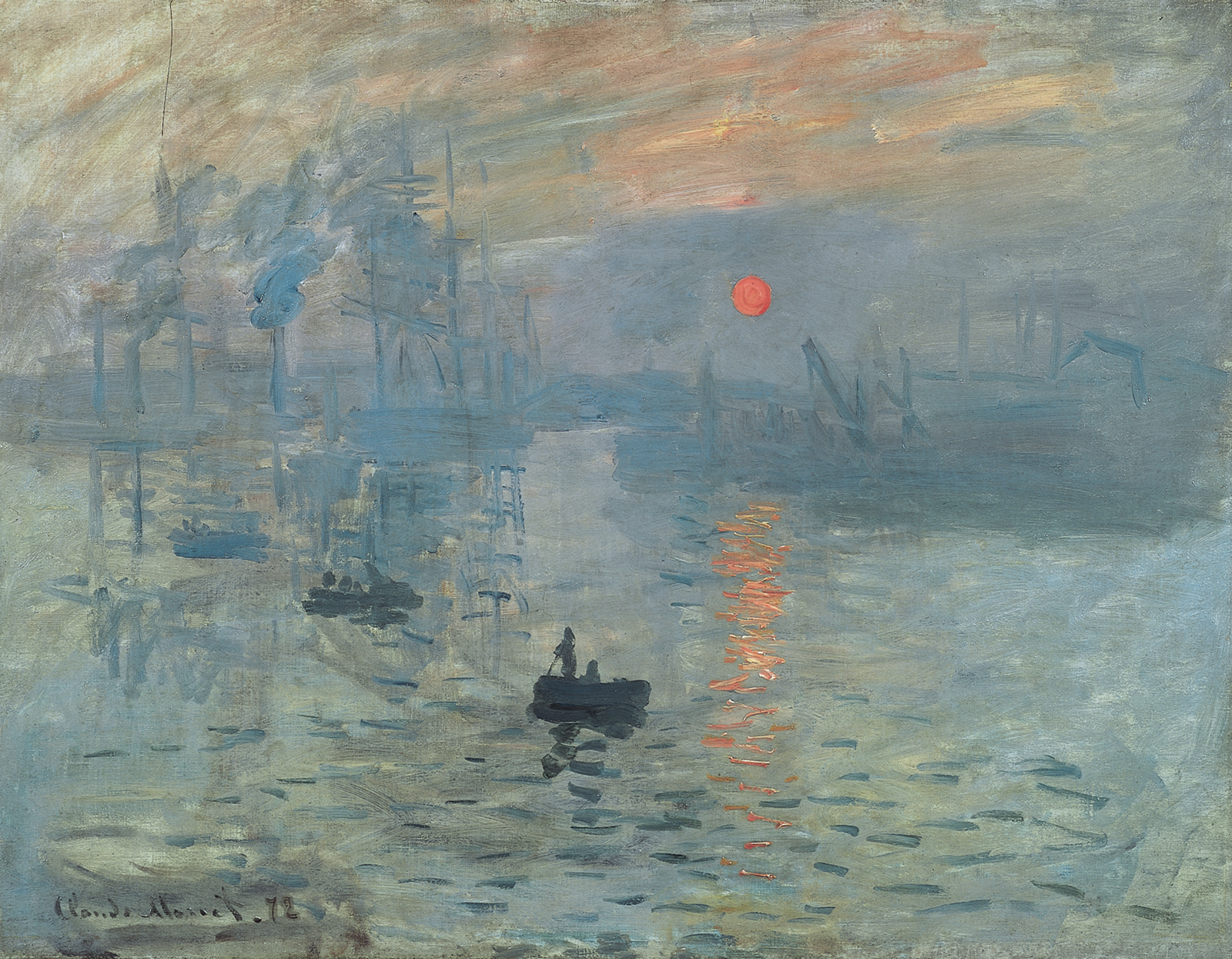
Impression, Sunrise by Claude Monet

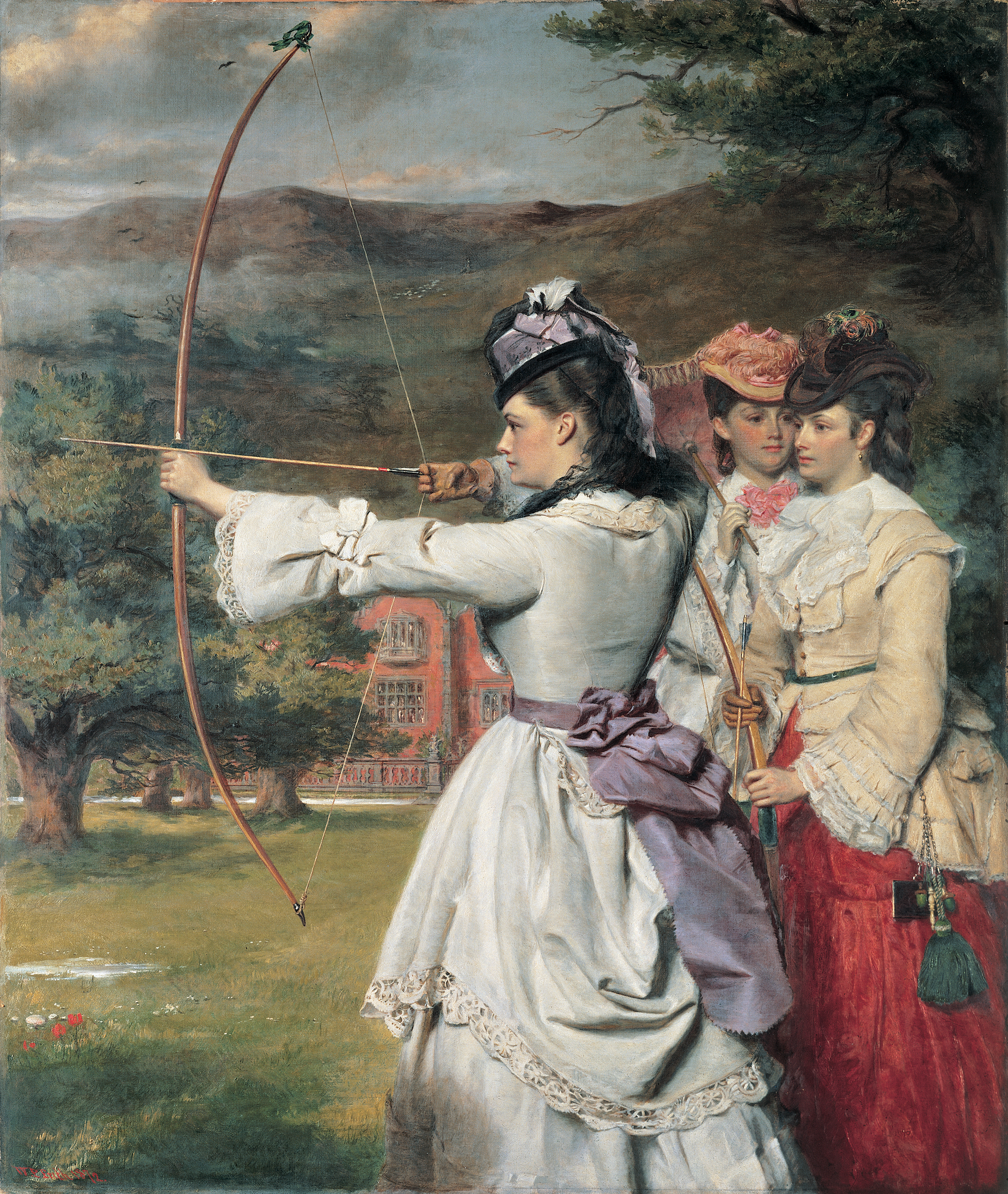
The Fair Toxophilites by William Powell Frith

- Peter Nicolai Arbo – The Wild Hunt of Odin
- Arnold Böcklin – Self-portrait with Death playing the fiddle
- Caspar Buberl – Fulton Memorial (New York City)
- Pierre Puvis de Chavannes
  - Hope
  - The White Rocks
- Giuseppe De Nittis – The Road from Naples to Brindisi
- Edgar Degas
  - Lorenzo Pagans and Auguste De Gas (completed)
  - The Ballet Scene from Meyerbeer's Opera "Robert le Diable" (original version, first shown)
- Gustave Doré – illustrations to London: A Pilgrimage (published)
- Frank Duveneck – The Whistling Boy (Cincinnati Art Museum)
- Luke Fildes – Fair Quiet and Sweet Rest
- William Powell Frith
  - The Fair Toxophilites
  - Henry VIII and Anne Boleyn Deer Shooting in Windsor Forest
- John Gast – American Progress
- Jean-Léon Gérôme – Pollice Verso ("Thumbs Down")
- Ivan Kramskoi
  - Christ in the Desert
  - Old Man with a crutch
- Henri Fantin-Latour – The Corner of the Table
- Jules Joseph Lefebvre – The Grasshopper
- Édouard Manet
  - Berthe Morisot with a Bouquet of Violets (Musée d'Orsay, Paris)
  - Berthe Morisot with a Fan (Musée d'Orsay, Paris)
  - Berthe Morisot (Private collection)
  - Le chemin de fer ("The Railroad") (National Gallery of Art, Washington, D.C.)
  - Racecourse in the Bois de Boulogne (Private collection)
- John Everett Millais – Hearts are Trumps
- Claude Monet
  - Effet de Brouillard
  - Impression, Sunrise
  - ‘’Regatta at Argenteuil’’
  - Springtime
- Thomas Moran – The Grand Canyon of the Yellowstone (first version)
- Berthe Morisot
  - The Cradle (Musée d'Orsay, Paris)
  - On the Balcony
- Vasily Perov
  - Portrait of Fyodor Dostoevsky
  - Portrait of Vladimir Dal
- Illarion Pryanishnikov – Empties
- Pierre-Auguste Renoir
  - Claude Monet Reading
  - Parisian Women in Algerian Costume (The Harem)
  - Le Pont-Neuf
  - Woman with Parasol Seated in the Garden
- Dante Gabriel Rossetti – Beata Beatrix (replica, commissioned by William Graham)
- Emil Jakob Schindler – The Steamer station on the Danube opposite Kaisermühlen
- Alfred Sisley
  - Bridge at Villeneuve-la-Garonne
  - Footbridge at Argenteuil
- Marcus Stone – Edward II and his favourite, Piers Gaveston
- James Tissot
  - Bad News
  - An Interesting Story
- Wilhelm Trübner – Auf dem Kanapee ("On the Sofa") (Nationalgalerie, Berlin)
- Frederick Walker – The Harbour of Refuge
- James McNeill Whistler
  - Cremorne Lights
  - Portrait of the Painter
- Mårten Eskil Winge – Thor's Fight with the Giants

== Births ==
- January 16 – Edward Gordon Craig, English theatrical designer (died 1966)
- January 25 – Eleanor Fortescue-Brickdale, English painter (died 1945)
- February 25 – Alice Bailly Swiss painter and multimedia artist (died 1938)
- March 7 – Piet Mondrian, Dutch painter (died 1944)
- April 18 – Beta Vukanović, Serbian painter and centenarian (died 1972)
- August 21 – Aubrey Beardsley, English painter and illustrator (died 1898)

== Deaths ==
- April 2 – Samuel F. B. Morse, American inventor and painter of portraits and historic scenes (born 1791)
- April 10 – John Mix Stanley, American painter (born 1814)
- May 24 – Julius Schnorr von Carolsfeld, German painter (born 1794)
- August 8 – Eduard Magnus, German painter (born 1799)
- September 30 – Jakob Alt, German landscape painter (born 1789)
- October 29 – Thomas Combe, English printer and patron of the arts (born 1796)
- November 5 – Thomas Sully, English-born American portrait painter (born 1783)
- November 13 – Margaret Sarah Carpenter, English portrait painter (born 1793)
- November 25 – John Partridge, British artist and portrait painter (born 1789)
- December 23 – George Catlin, American painter who specialized in portraits of Native Americans in the Old West (born 1796)
- probable – Severin Roesen, American painter of still lives (born 1815)
