= Le Pont-Neuf (Renoir) =

1872 painting by Pierre-Auguste Renoir

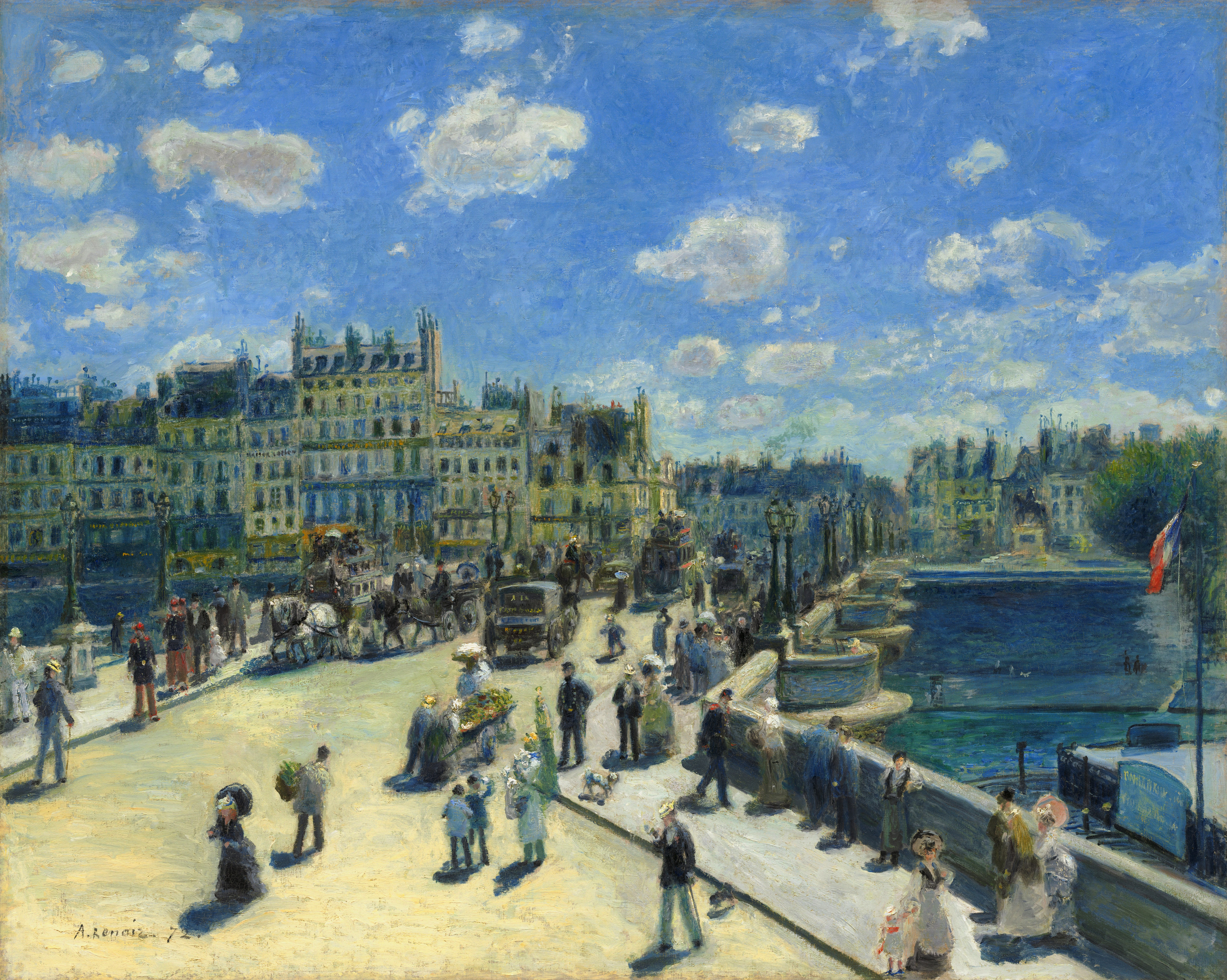
- Artist: Pierre-Auguste Renoir
- Year: 1872
- Medium: Oil on canvas
- Dimensions: 74 cm × 93 cm (29 in × 37 in)
- Location: National Gallery of Art

Le Pont-Neuf is an 1872 oil-on-canvas painting by the French artist Pierre-Auguste Renoir. It is held by the National Gallery of Art in Washington, D.C.

== Background ==
The Pont Neuf is the oldest standing bridge across the river Seine in Paris, France. It was completed in 1607 by Henry IV. In 1867, French painters Claude Monet and Renoir first depicted the bridge in their series of riverbank paintings, returning to the subject again in 1872. This time, they were painting in the turbulent aftermath of the Paris Commune uprising.

== Description ==
Both Renoir and Monet painted separate works using the same perspective to depict the Right Bank side of the bridge from the second-floor window of a cafe. Edmond Renoir, Renoir's brother, helped him to set the scene by delaying people walking on the bridge and asking them questions, giving Renoir time to sketch their likeness. Edmond himself appears twice in the painting with a walking stick and straw boater hat. Renoir started his work in the spring and sold it at auction to French art dealer Paul Durand-Ruel on March 24, 1875, for only 300 francs.

== Gallery ==
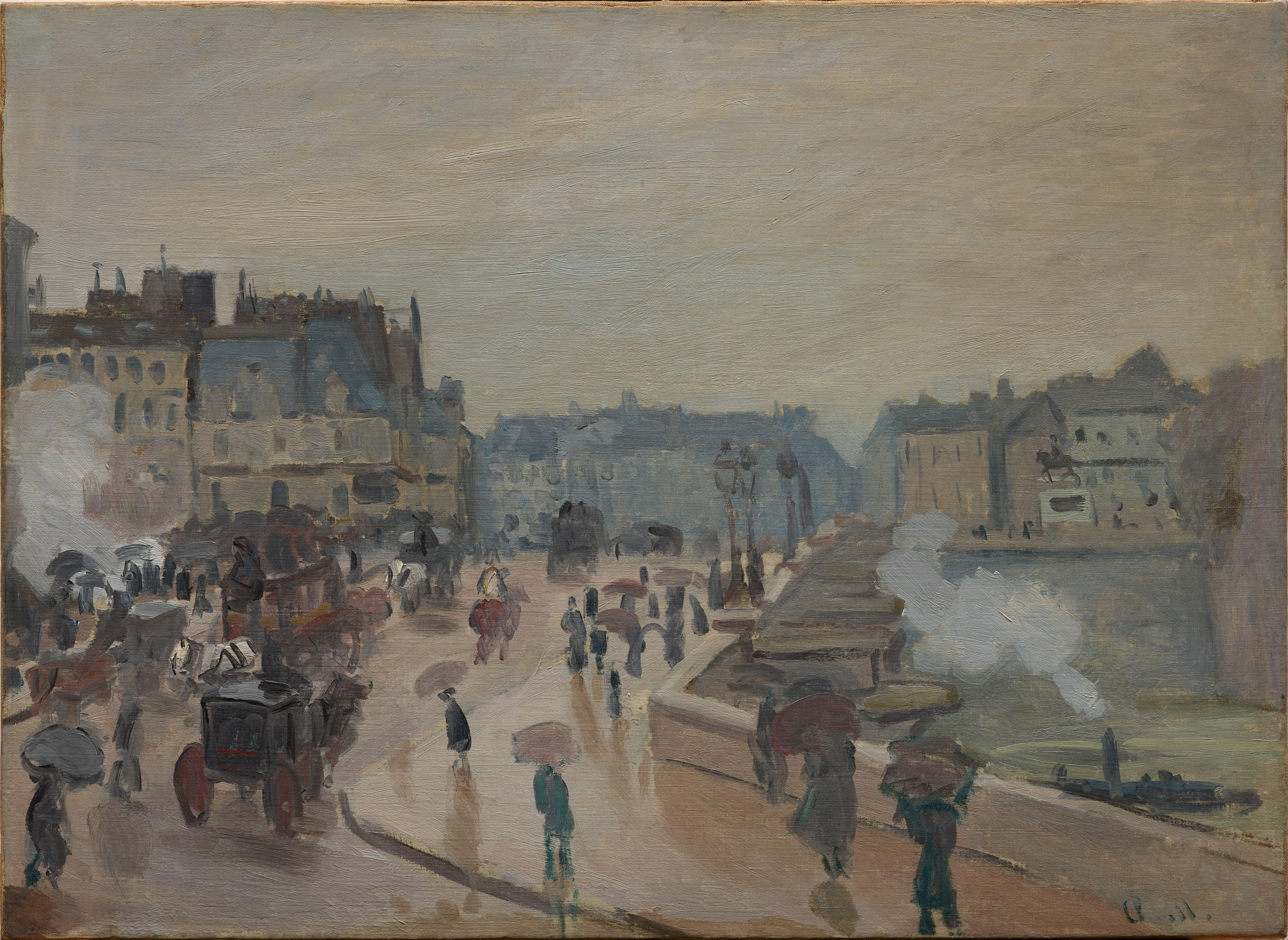
Claude Monet, 《Le Pont-Neuf》, 1872, 51.6 x 72.4 cm, Dallas Museum of Art

== See also ==
- List of paintings by Pierre-Auguste Renoir
