= Berthe Morisot with a Bouquet of Violets =

Painting by Édouard Manet

- Berthe Morisot au bouquet de violettes (French)
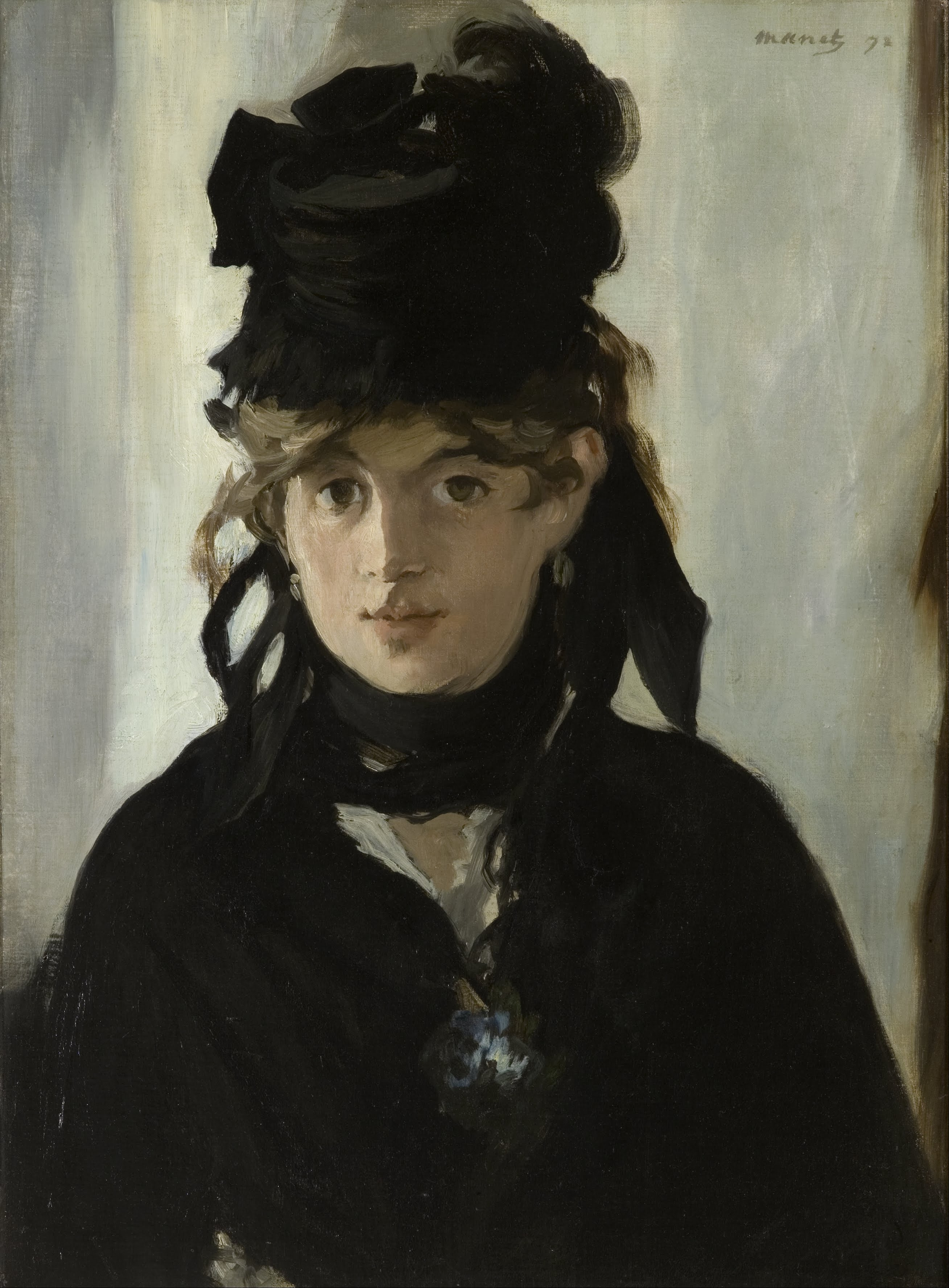
- Artist: Édouard Manet
- Year: 1872
- Medium: Oil on canvas
- Subject: Berthe Morisot
- Dimensions: 55.5 cm × 40.5 cm (21.9 in × 15.9 in)
- Location: Musée d'Orsay, Paris
- Accession: 100102

Berthe Morisot with a Bouquet of Violets (French: Berthe Morisot au bouquet de violettes) is an 1872 oil painting by Édouard Manet. It depicts fellow painter Berthe Morisot dressed in black mourning dress, with a barely visible bouquet of violets. The painting, sometimes known as Portrait of Berthe Morisot, Berthe Morisot in a black hat or Young woman in a black hat, is in the collection of the Musée d'Orsay in Paris. Manet also created an etching and two lithographs of the same composition.

== Background ==
Manet became acquainted with Berthe Morisot in 1868. She was the grand-niece of Fragonard, and also a painter; Morisot and Manet influenced each other's work. He painted her portrait many times, including his earlier work The Balcony. She married Manet's brother Eugène in 1874.

Manet had remained in Paris during the Franco-Prussian War in 1870–71, and served in the Garde Nationale to defend the city in the Siege of Paris. He was unable to paint while he was serving, and left Paris after the city surrendered at the end of January 1871. He returned to painting later in 1871, and returned to Paris after the defeat of the Paris Commune in May 1871.

This painting was one of several portraits of a black-clad Morisot by Manet between 1872 and 1874: others show her with a pink shoe, with a fan, and veiled.

== Description ==
The half-length portrait is on a canvas measuring 55.5 × 40.5 centimetres (21.9 × 15.9 in) – 71.5 × 57.5 centimetres (28.1 × 22.6 in) with frame – and is signed "Manet 72" in the upper right corner. It is a study in shades of black. Unusually for Manet's portraits, which typically have an even light, Morisot is lit from one side, so that she is brightly illuminated on her right side and the left is in deep shadow. She wears black mourning dress and hat, with her face surrounded by black ribbons and scarves, against a lighter background, and an earring in each ear. The violet flowers are barely perceptible where the neckline of Morisot's dress dips towards her chest. Manet also painted violets in his Woman with a Parrot of 1866.

Manet painted Morisot with black eyes, although her eyes were actually green. The dark costume and eyes may allude to Manet's impression that she looked Spanish. Manet had earlier painted a similar portrait of his own mother in mourning, made in 1863, which shows his mother clad in black, on a dark background.

The painting was followed by a similar etching – probably the first copy, with the pose reversed – and two lithographs, all made in 1872 to 1874. Manet made a similar painting of Morisot in mourning dress in 1874, after the death of her father, Edmé Tiburce Morisot.

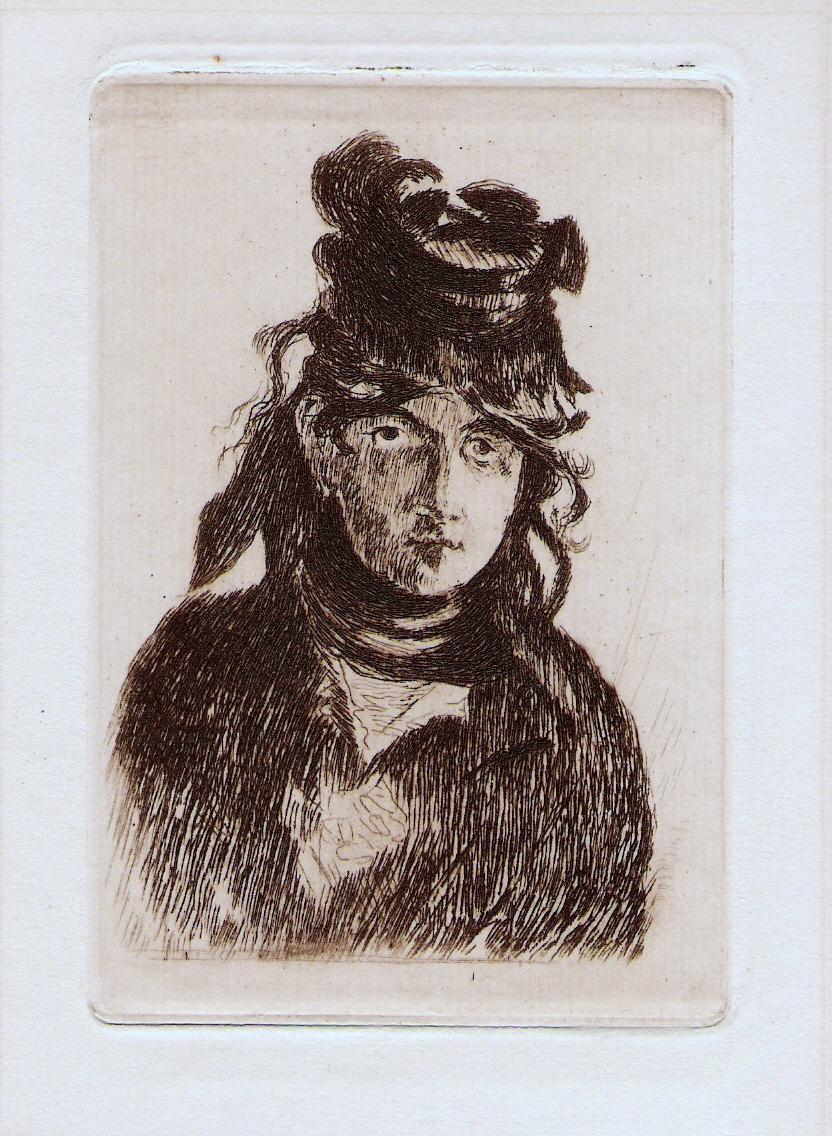
Etching

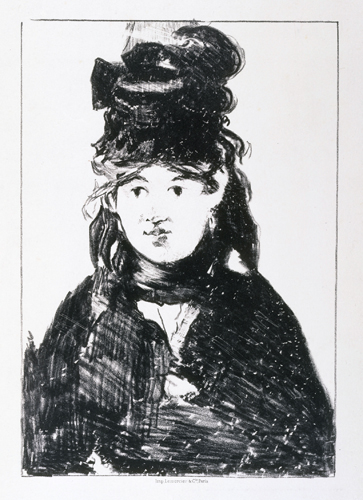
Lithograph

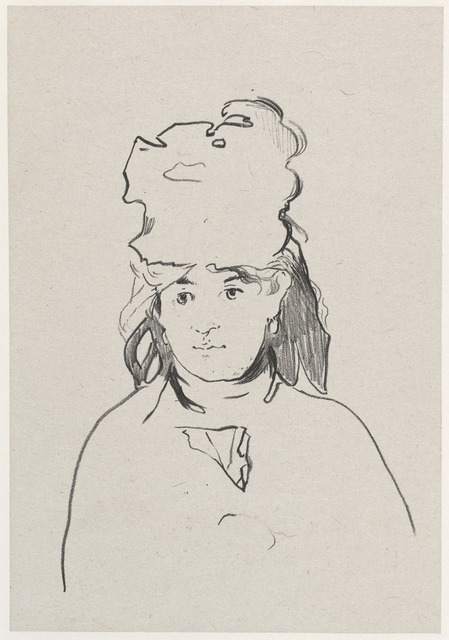
Lithograph

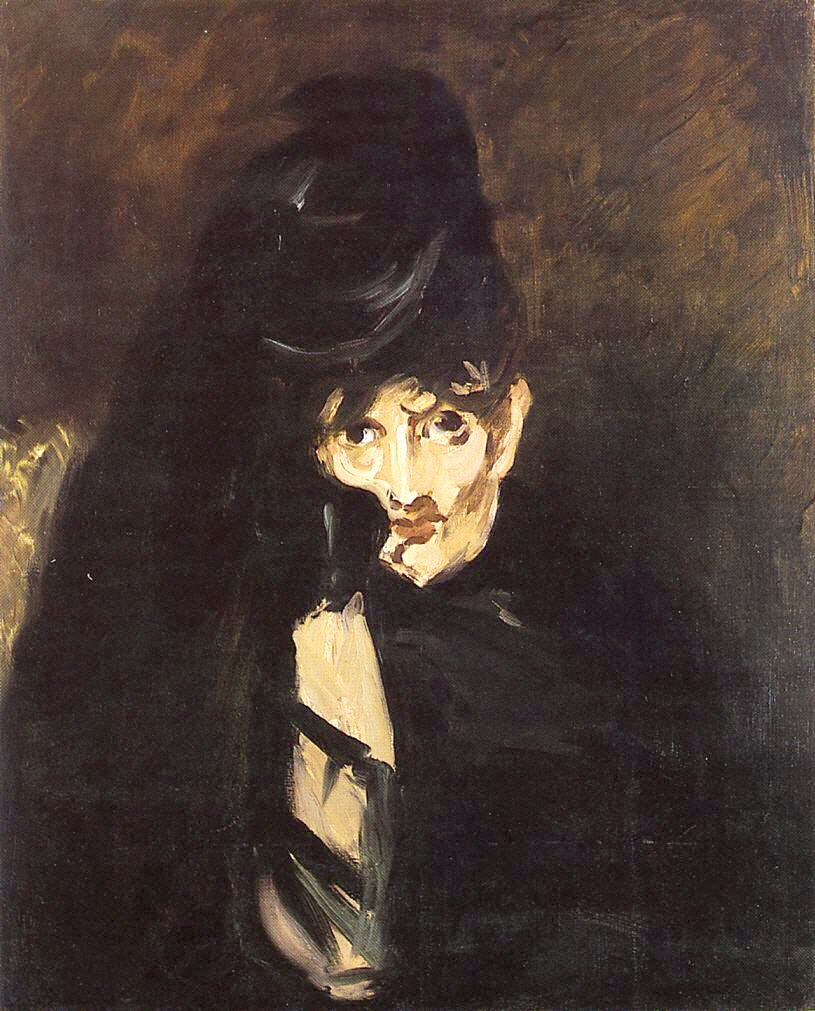
Berthe Morisot in mourning, 1874, private collection

== Reception ==
The work was quickly considered a masterpiece of Manet's work. It was praised by Paul Valéry in the catalogue of Manet's retrospective at the Orangerie in 1932 for the centenary of his birth. Valéry knew the painting well: he was married to Morisot's niece, Jeannie Gobillard, the daughter of Morisot's sister Yves and her husband Theodore Gobillard, and so he also related by marriage to Manet; indeed, his wedding in 1900 was a double celebration at the same time as the marriage of Morisot's daughter Julie Manet to Ernest Rouart. Valéry compared Manet's painting to Vermeer's Girl with a Pearl Earring: "I do not rank anything in Manet's work higher than a certain portrait of Berthe Morisot dated 1872". Of Morisot's gaze he said, "…this figure that seems to offer a presence of absence, as though the gaze, even while giving itself, were withdrawing at the same time…"

Manet sold or gave the painting to collector and art critic Théodore Duret. Morisot herself acquired the painting in 1894, paying 5,100 francs in the sale of Duret's collection. After her death in 1895, it was kept by her daughter Julie until her own death in 1966, and then it was in the collection of her son (Morisot's grandson) Clément Rouart. It was acquired for the Musée d'Orsay in 1998, with funding from the Fonds du Patrimoine, the Meyer Foundation, the China Times Group and a sponsorship programme coordinated by the Japanese The Nikkei newspaper.

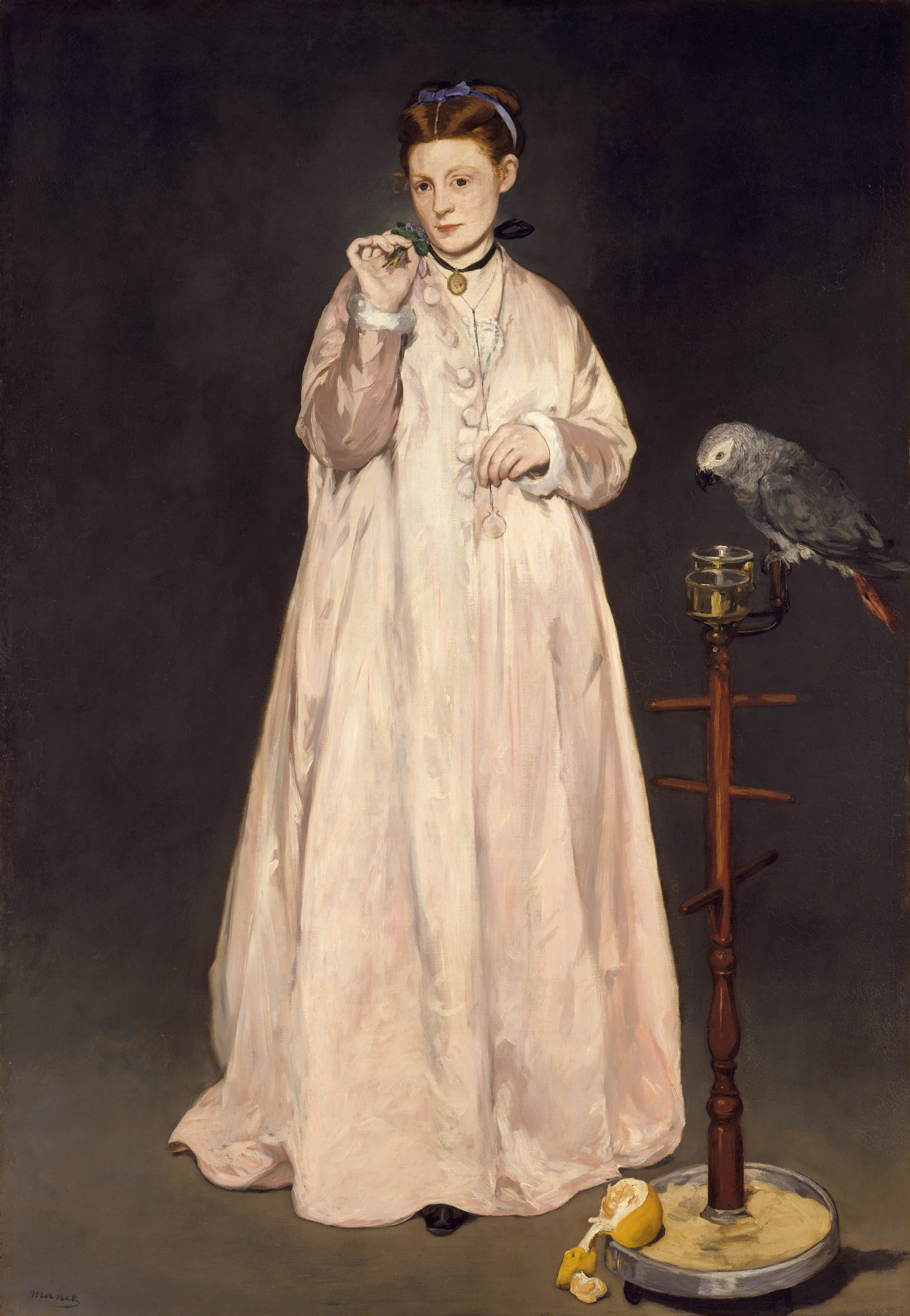
Lady with a Parrot, 1866, Metropolitan Museum of Art, New York

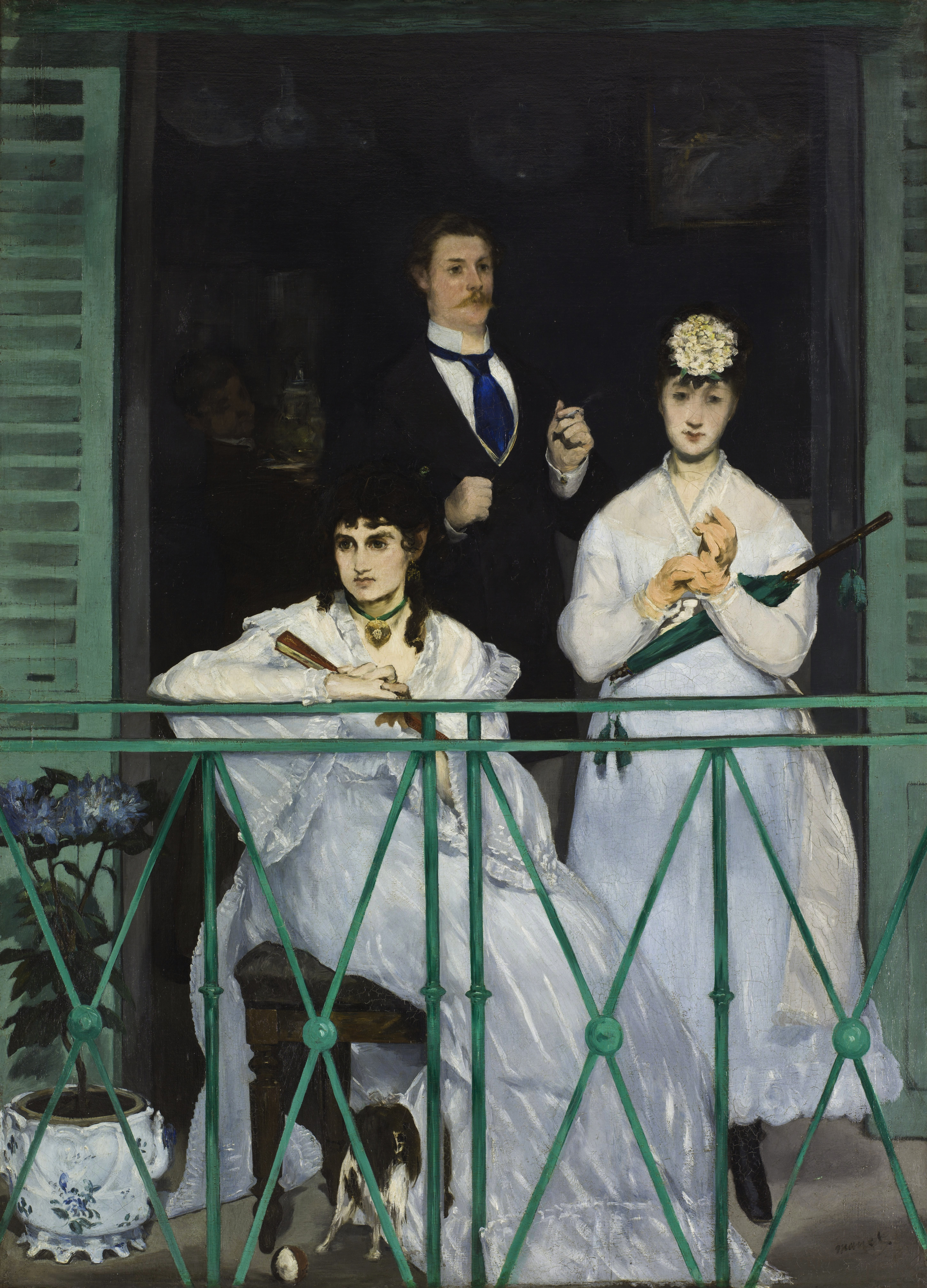
The Balcony, 1868, Musée d'Orsay, Paris

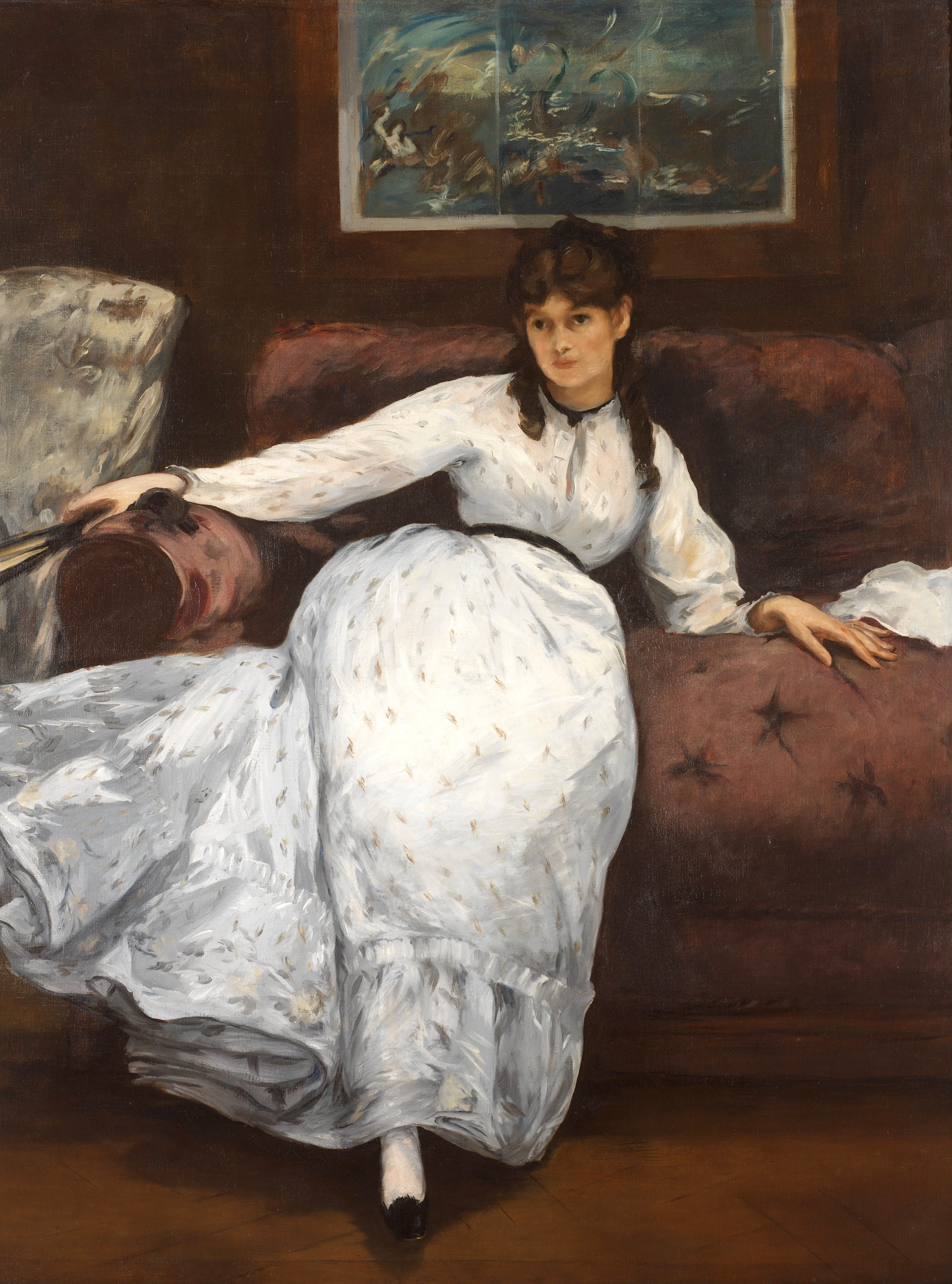
Berthe Morisot (Repose), 1869, Rhode Island School of Design Museum, Providence

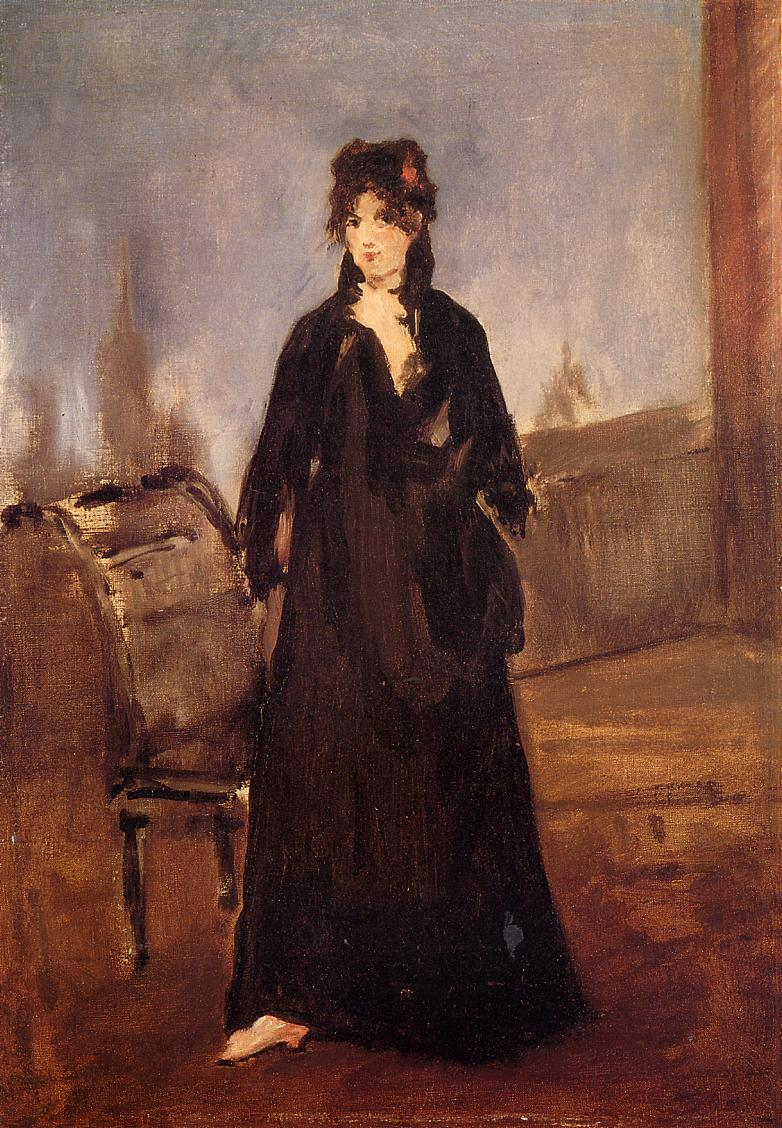
Berthe Morisot with pink shoes, 1872, Hiroshima Museum of Art

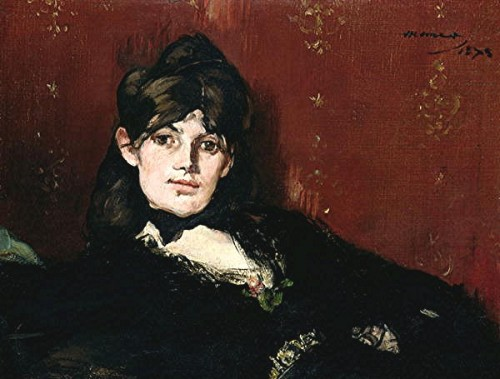
Berthe Morisot reclining, 1873, Musée Marmottan Monet, Paris

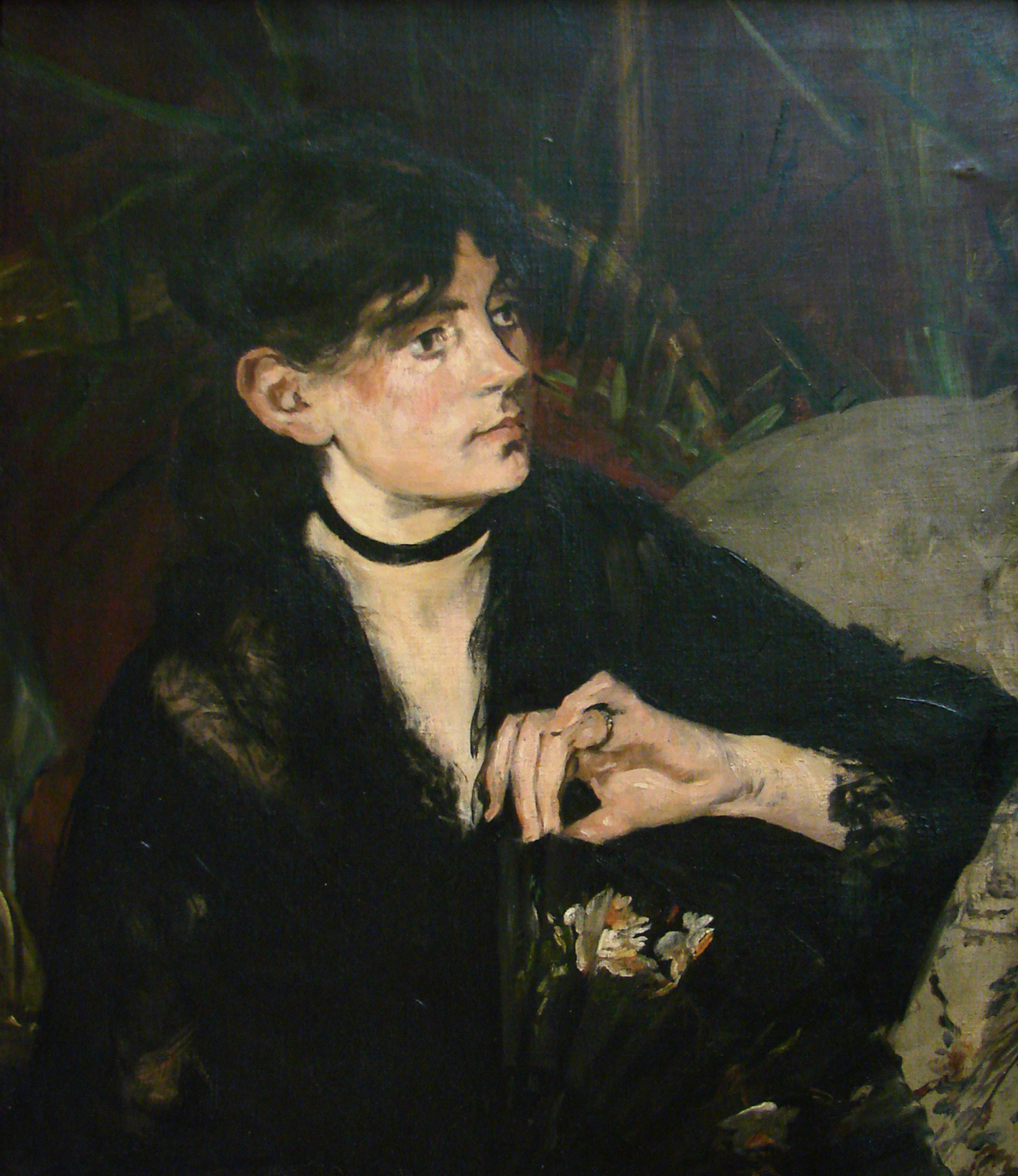
Berthe Morisot with a Fan, 1874, Palais des Beaux-Arts de Lille

== See also ==
- List of paintings by Édouard Manet
- 1872 in art
