= The Fair Toxophilites =

Painting by William Powell Frith

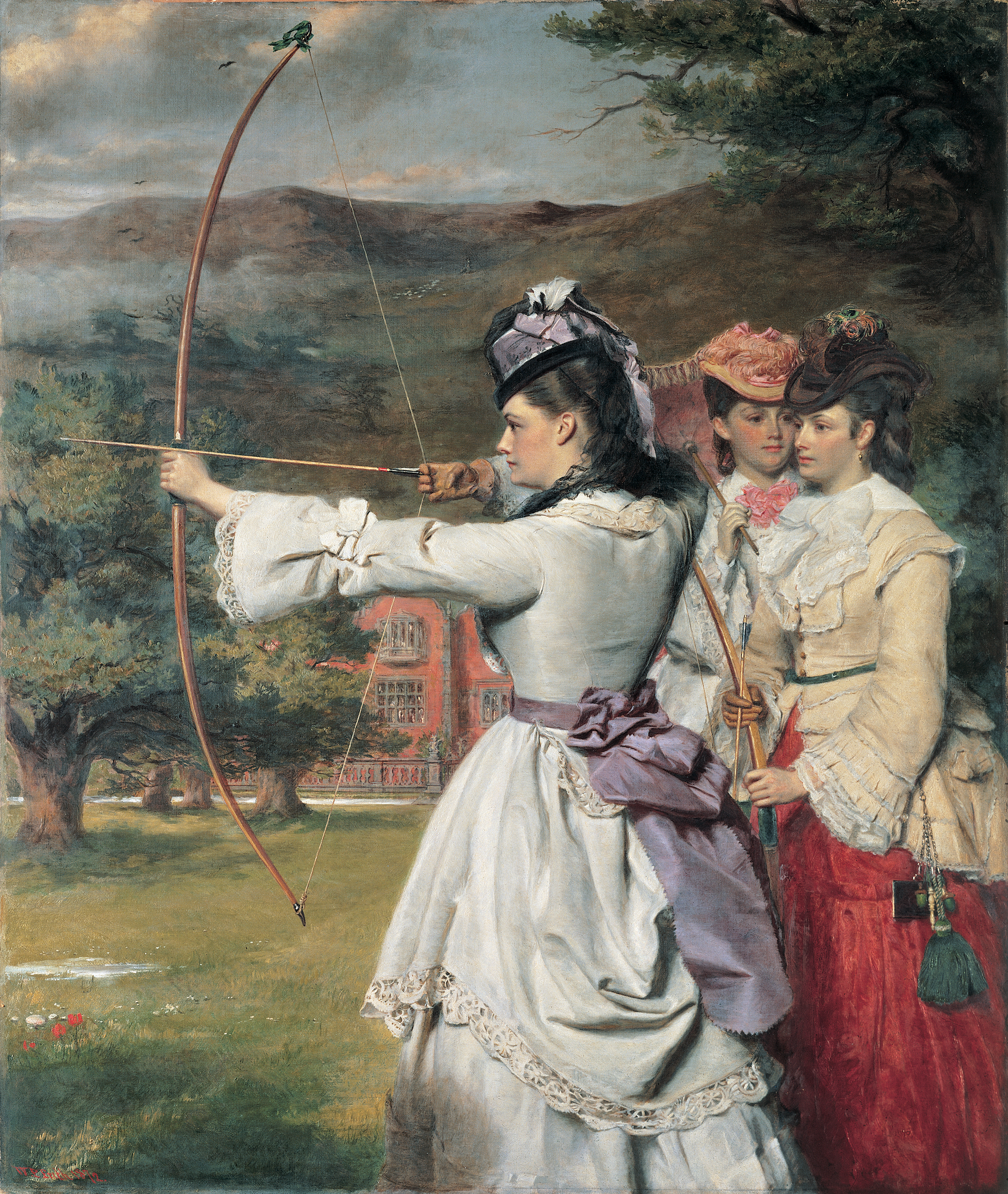
- Artist: William Powell Frith
- Year: 1872
- Type: Oil on canvas
- Dimensions: 98.2 cm × 81.7 cm (38.7 in × 32.2 in)
- Location: Royal Albert Memorial Museum, Exeter

The Fair Toxophilites is an 1872 oil painting by the British artist William Powell Frith depicting three young women practicing archery. It also known by the title English Archers, Nineteenth Century. Today the painting is in the collection of the Royal Albert Memorial Museum, in Exeter.

The three women portrayed were Frith's daughters Alice, Fanny and Louise. They are all dressed in a very fashionable way, reflecting their upper class status. It reflects the Victorian era archery craze, referred to in the novel Daniel Deronda by George Eliot. Frith exhibited it at the Royal Academy's Summer Exhibition of 1873 alongside another featuring women playing billiards. The review in The Athenaeum, which was generally hostile to Frith's work, was critical. A more positive reception came from The Art Journal and The Times.

== Bibliography ==
- Bills, Mark & Knight, Vivien (ed.) William Powell Frith: Painting the Victorian Age. Yale University Press, 2006
- Cohen, Michael. Sisters: Relation and Rescue in Nineteenth-century British Novels and Paintings. Fairleigh Dickinson University Press, 1995.
- Green, Richard & Sellars, Jane. William Powell Frith: The People's Painter. Bloomsbury, 2019.
- Rogers, Pat (ed.) The Oxford Illustrated History of English Literature. Oxford University Press, 2001.
- Wood, Christopher. William Powell Frith: A Painter and His World. Sutton Publishing, 2006.
