= Lorenzo Pagans and Auguste de Gas =

1871–72 painting by Edgar Degas

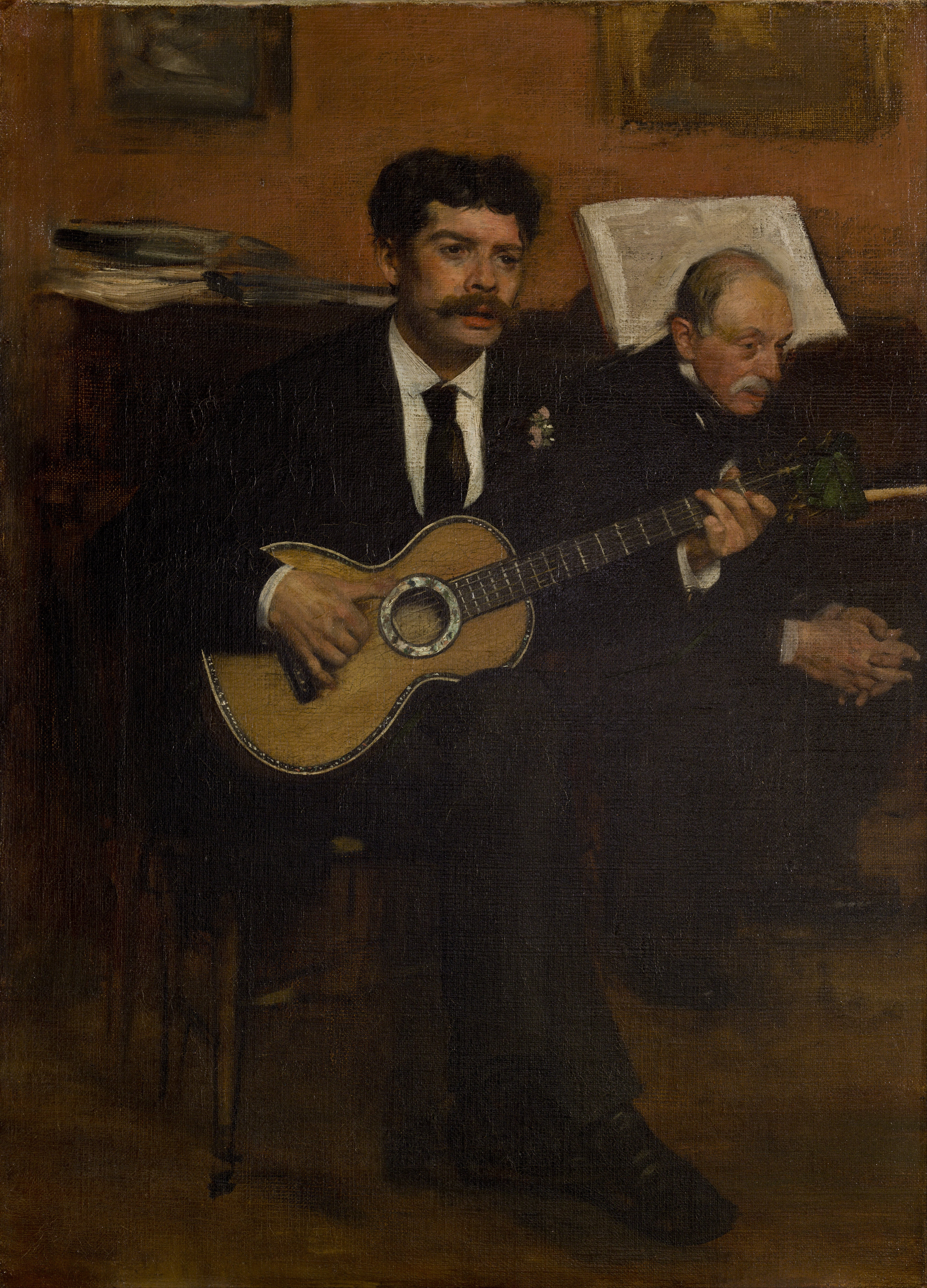
- Artist: Edgar Degas
- Year: 1871–1872
- Medium: oil on canvas
- Dimensions: 54.5 cm × 39.5 cm (21.5 in × 15.6 in)
- Location: Musée d'Orsay, Paris

Lorenzo Pagans and Auguste de Gas is the title of a painting by Edgar Degas. Painted in oil on canvas, it is 54.5 cm high and 39.5 cm wide. The double portrait, painted around 1871–1872, shows the Catalan tenor Lorenzo Pagans performing a song and guitar recital. The painter's father, Auguste de Gas, sits in the audience behind him. The painting is one of a series of portraits of musicians that Degas painted beginning in the late 1860s. It is in the collection of the Musée d'Orsay in Paris.

== Image description ==
The painting Lorenzo Pagans and Auguste de Gas is a double portrait in an interior. The central figure in the middle of the painting is the Spanish singer Lorenzo Pagans, sitting frontally opposite the viewer, with Auguste de Gas, Edgar Degas' father, seated behind him on the right. Both men are wearing a dark suit, dark shoes, and a white shirt. Pagans is also wearing a dark tie and a boutonnière on his left lapel. He is sitting in the posture of a guitar player with his legs crossed on a simple wooden chair. Pagans rests the instrument on his thighs, placing his right hand on the body to play the strings and his left hand on the neck. The guitar's light-colored wood and mother-of-pearl-like inlays around the soundhole and body edge stand in stark contrast to Pagans' dark suit. A dark green ribbon tied to the head of the guitar, on the other hand, is barely noticeable. The musician's head is tilted slightly to the right edge of the frame, and his dark eyes seem to be fixed on something outside the frame to the right. His mouth is half open, giving the impression that Pagans is performing a song. Pagans' face has a healthy, light complexion. A broad, dark mustache, the ends of which are twisted into points, is noticeable. His dark, slightly curly hair is cut short, leaving his ears uncovered.

In contrast to the young singer Pagans, Auguste de Gas, sitting diagonally behind him, is a man marked by age. His posture is characterized by his upper body leaning forward, his head pointing downwards and his hands clasped together in front of his knees. The face is depicted in half profile. The ends of a gray moustache point downwards and a high forehead emphasizes the thinning hair. Edgar Degas depicts his father as an attentive listener looking down, lost in thought. His role takes a back seat to that of the singer Pagan, who dominates this double portrait.

While Edgar Degas rendered the faces, hands, and guitar with precise descriptions, other areas of the painting are executed in a fleeting style. The room in which the two sitters are standing is only partially visible. The wooden floor is outlined with horizontal brushstrokes in iridescent shades of brown and gray. Pagans' wooden chair, with its legs and cross-bracing, stands on it. Father de Gas may be sitting on a piano bench or stool, but no such furniture is visible in the painting, as Pagans have obscured this area. Behind the two figures is a dark grand piano, the keyboard of which extends to the edge of the picture to the right of Auguste de Gas. Behind Father de Gas, an open music book on the piano's music stand frames the sitter's head. More music lies on the closed piano lid at the left edge of the picture. Above the musical instrument is a reddish-brown painted wall on which hangs two framed pictures cut off by the top edge of the painting. The two pictures are poorly executed and do not reveal the subject. Light falls on the scene from an unknown source, creating highlights on the guitar and the foreheads, cheeks, and hands of the two sitters.

The bodies of Lorenzo Pagans and Auguste de Gas are not facing each other, but both are facing the room. It can be assumed that there are other people in the area outside the right edge of the picture. It remains unclear, however, whether Pagans is looking at other people. His gaze can also be read as a sign of concentration on his lecture. Auguste de Gas is not necessarily looking at anything either, although his eyes are open. His facial expression emphasizes his intense listening. In this painting, Edgar Degas has not only depicted the contrast between a young man and an old man but also the theme of music, with the singer and guitarist performing and his listener. Author Melissa MacQuillan comments, "Rarely has the relationship between the musical performer and his listener been so clearly depicted.

== Variations on the theme ==
Around the same time as the portrait of Lorenzo Pagans and Auguste de Gas, Degas created a variation of the subject entitled Degas' Father Listening to Lorenzo Pagans (Museum of Fine Arts, Boston). In this version, Lorenzo Pagans is shown in profile and moved to the left edge of the painting. He is clearly in the shadow area of the painting and thus plays a secondary role. The main figure in this painting is Auguste de Gas, whose head appears in the brighter light and who has otherwise assumed the same position as in the double portrait of Lorenzo Pagans and Auguste de Gas. These two paintings are among the few portraits that Edgar Degas painted of his father. After Auguste de Gas died in 1874, his son took up the subject again. In an 1882 double portrait of Pagans and Degas' father (private collection), Pagans is seen singing with a music book in his hand. Here, Degas' father sits as a peripheral figure in the background. There is also a pastel sketch of this painting (private collection). A few months before Lorenzo Pagans died in 1882, he also painted the portrait Portrait of Lorenzo Pagans (Man with a Cigar) (National Gallery, Prague), in which the musician is portrayed as a half-length portrait in a private pose and without any reference to his existence as a musician.

Variations by Degas

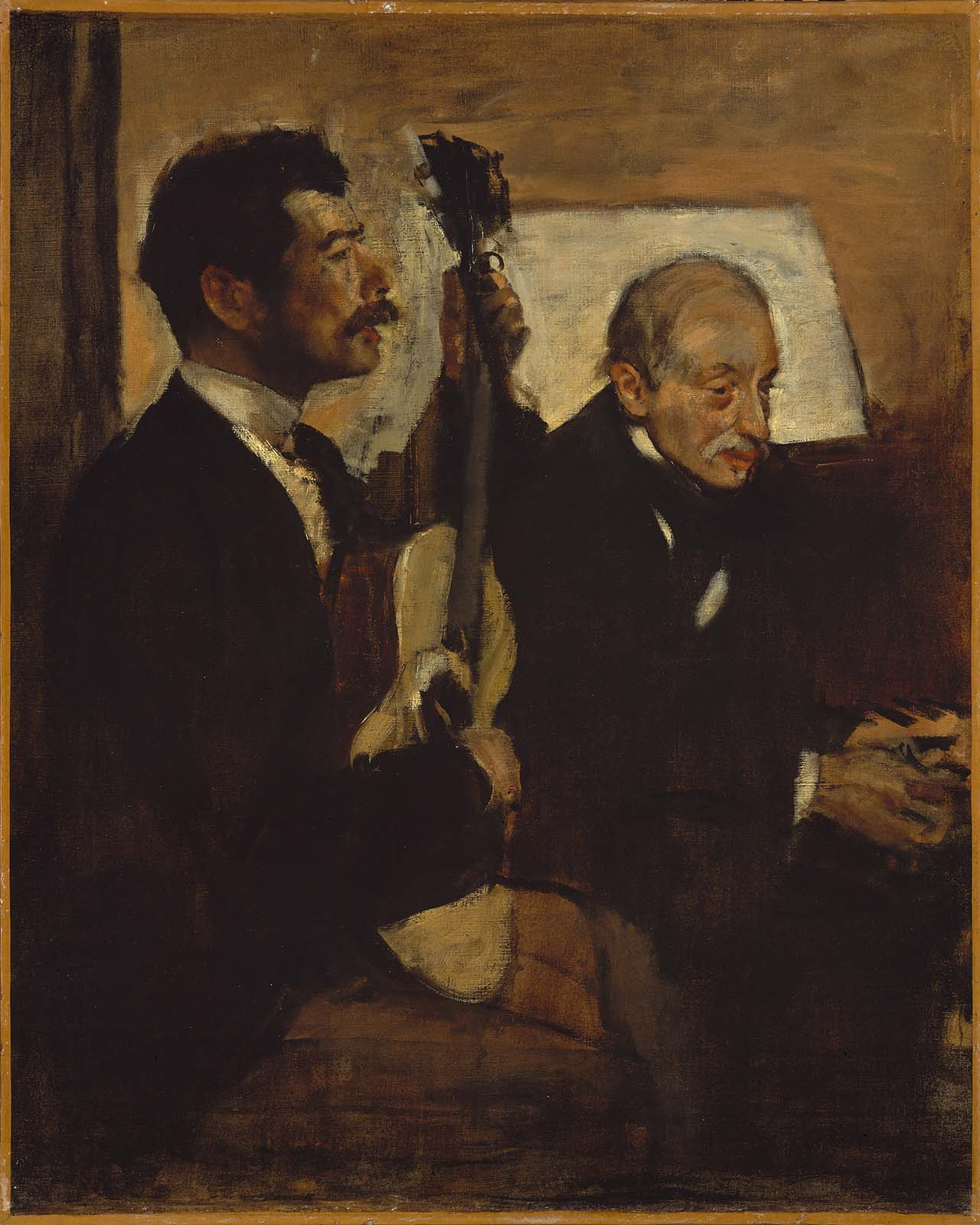
Degas' Father Listening to Lorenzo Pagans, c. 1869–1872

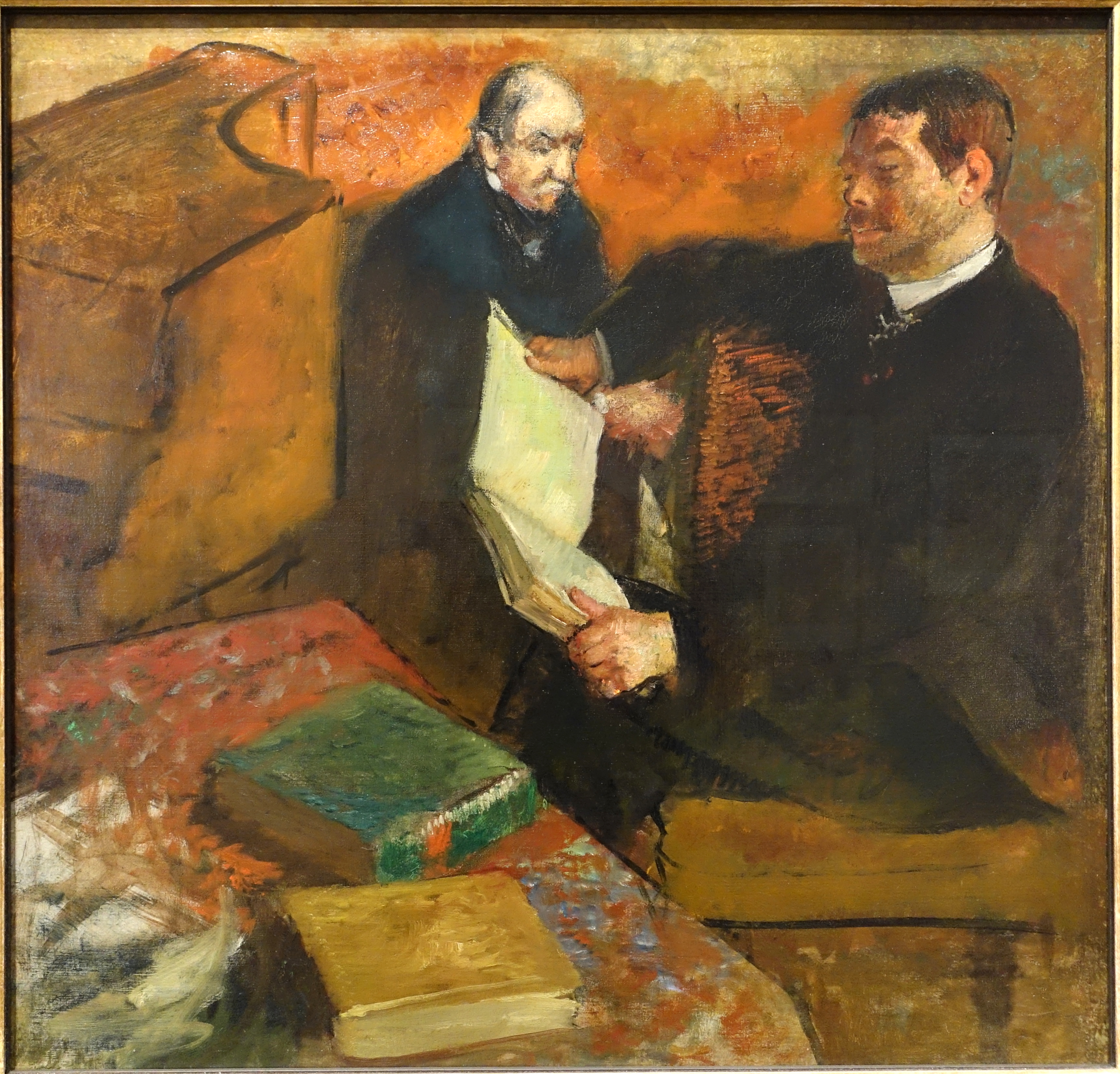
Pagans and Degas' father, 1882

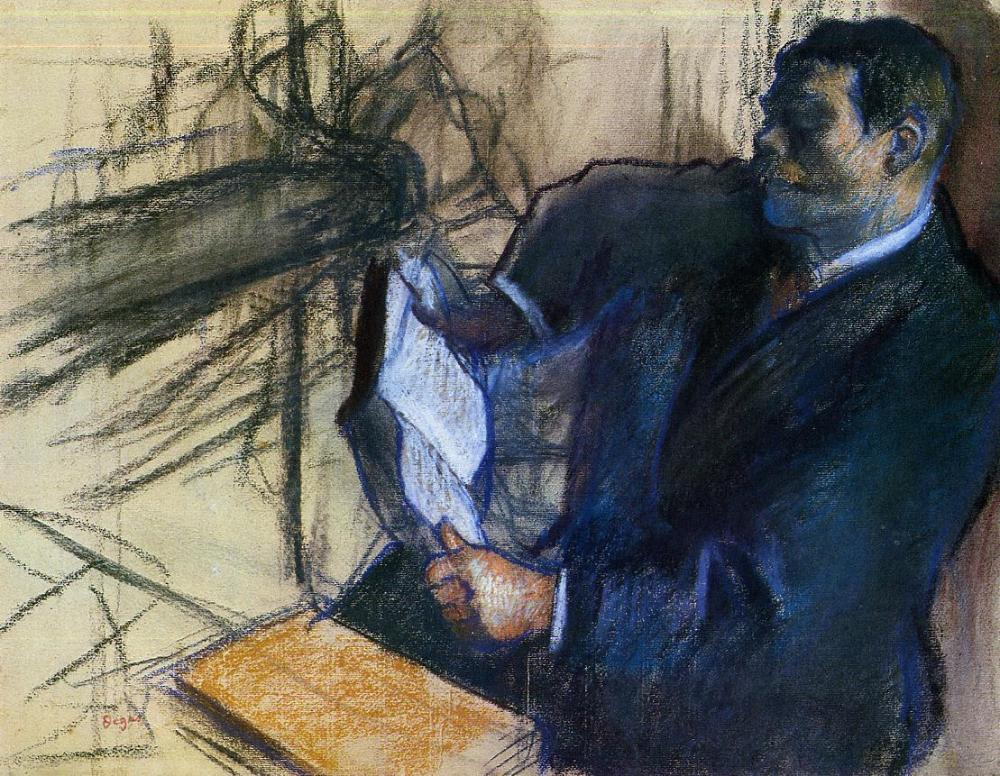
Pagans and Degas' Father (pastel sketch), 1882

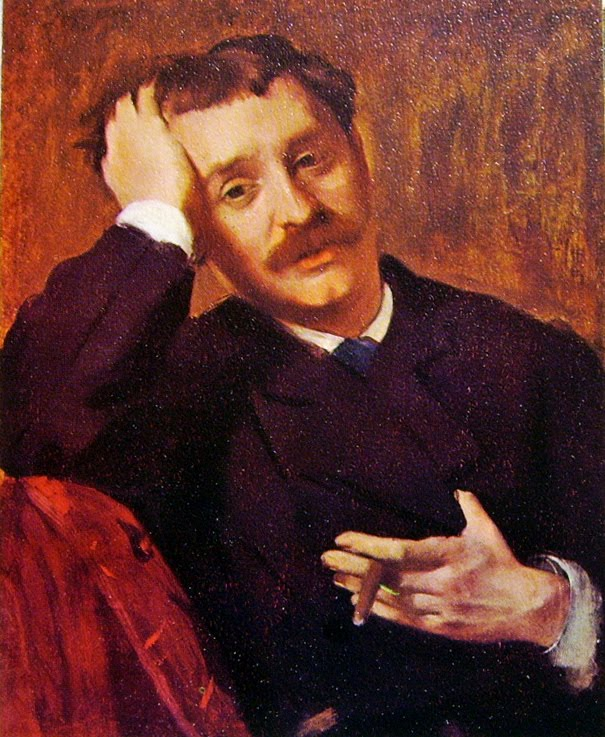
Portrait of Lorenzo Pagans (Man with a Cigar), 1882

== Background for creating the painting ==
The Auguste de Gas depicted in the painting was the father of the painter Edgar Degas and was known as a music lover. The scene of the painting Lorenzo Pagans and Auguste de Gas takes place in the music room of his apartment at 4 rue de Mondovi in the 1st arrondissement of Paris. Family and friends met here every Monday evening to exchange ideas, sometimes enriched by musical performances. Auguste de Gas's daughter Marguerite, his friend Blanche Camus, and the pianist Suzanne Manet, who came with her husband, the painter Édouard Manet, played on Érard's grand piano. The singer and pianist Marie Dihau also performed in Auguste de Gas's salon, and her brother, the bassoonist Désiré Dihau, came from the Paris Opera. Beginning in the late 1860s, his son, Edgar Degas, discovered opera as a subject for his paintings, repeatedly depicting musicians alongside ballet dancers. In The Orchestra of the Opera (Musée d'Orsay), for example, he painted a group portrait of the bassoonist Désiré Dihau. Degas also portrayed various musicians in domestic settings. These include the portraits The Cellist Pilet (Musée d'Orsay), Madame Camus at the Piano (E. G. Bührle Collection, Zurich), and Marie Dihau at the Piano (Musée d'Orsay). Like Lorenzo Pagans in the double portrait with Father de Gas, all these musicians are shown with their instruments. This is also true of the double portrait of two unknown persons in the painting Violinist with Young Woman (Detroit Institute of Arts), painted around 1871. This painting bears certain similarities to the painting of Lorenzo Pagans and Auguste de Gas. In both paintings, the subject is music in a private salon, not a performance in a concert hall. In addition, both paintings are sparsely furnished, and the wall with the cropped picture frames in the double portrait of Lorenzo Pagans and Auguste de Gas finds its counterpart in the fireplace cropped from the right edge in the painting Violinist with Young Woman. Above all, there are parallels in the execution: In both paintings, Degas finely worked out the heads of the figures, while large parts of the composition show a rather fleeting brushstroke.

Related pictures by Degas

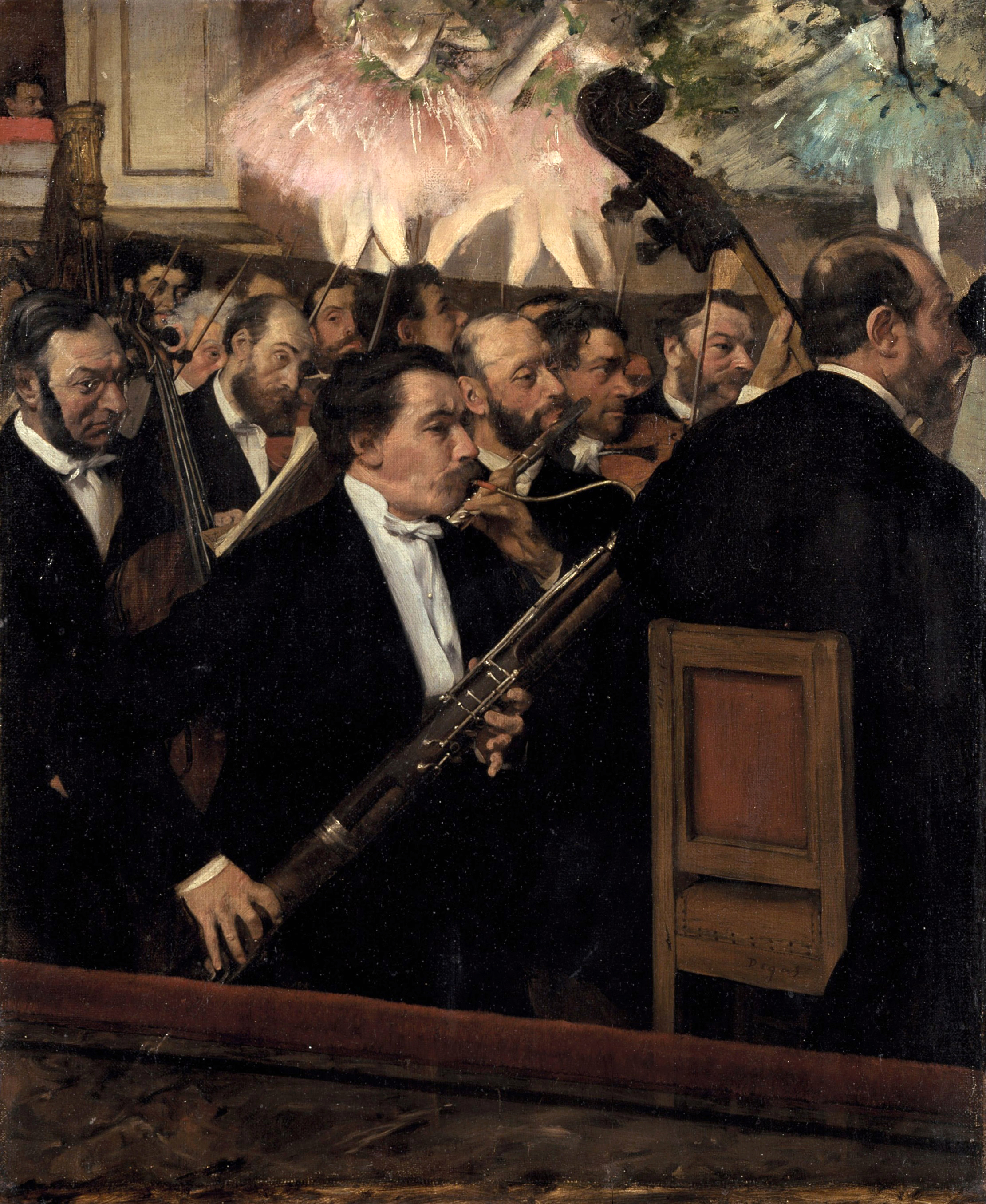
The Orchestra of the Opera, c. 1870

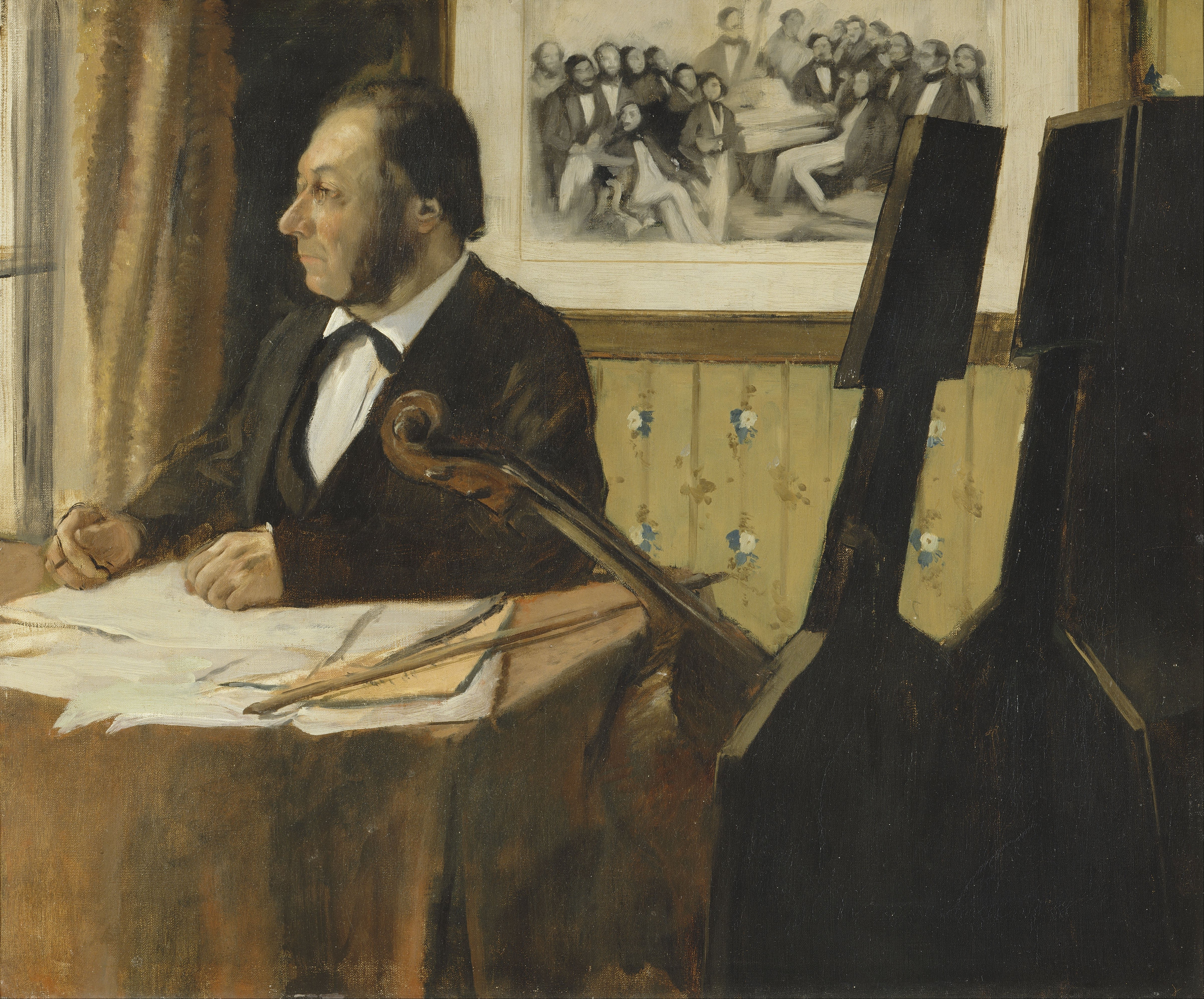
The Violoncellist Pilet, 1868–1869

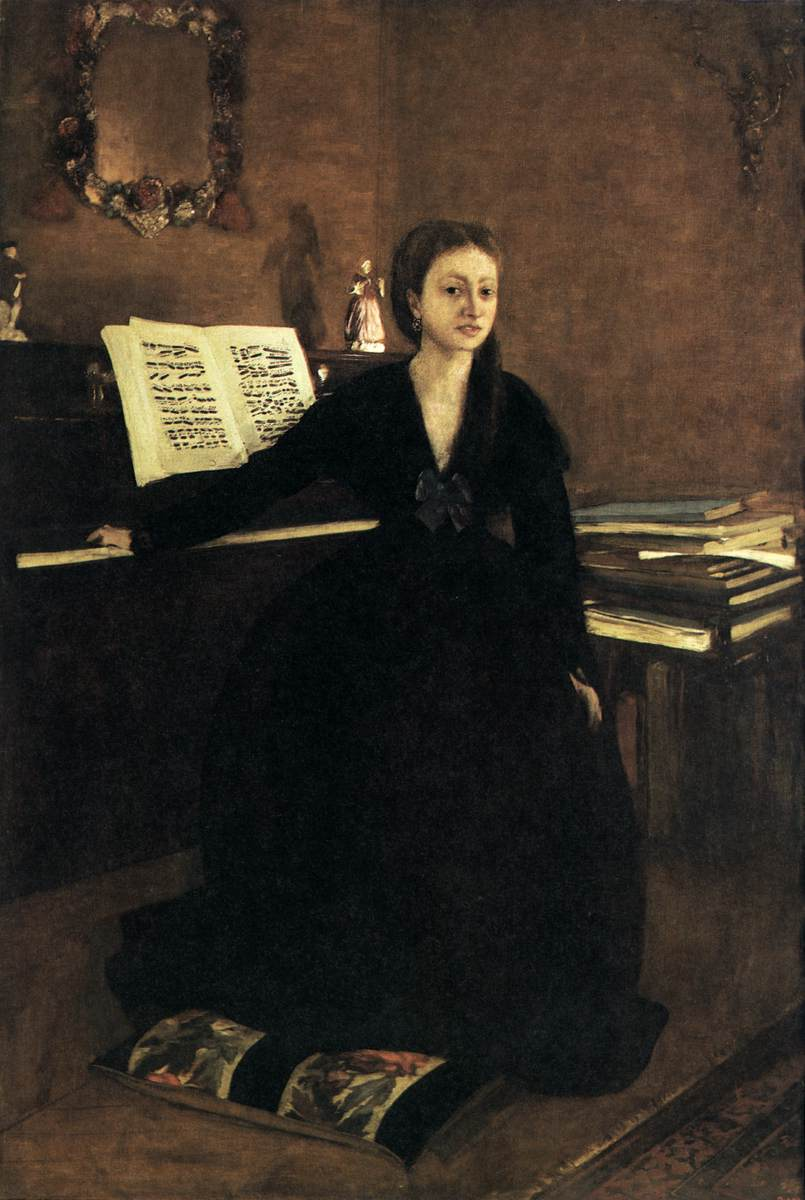
Madame Camus at the Piano, 1869

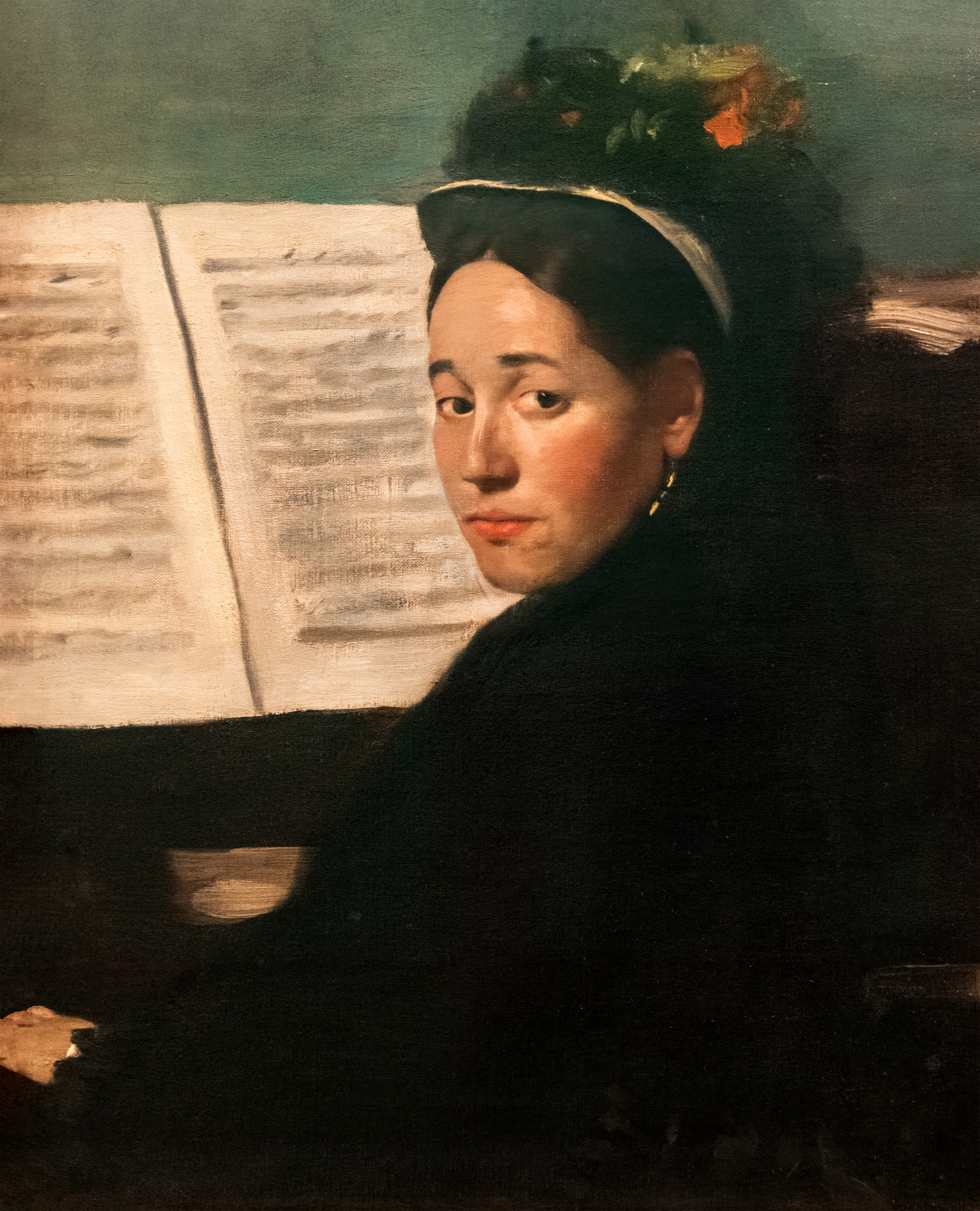
Madame Dihau at the Piano, 1869–1872

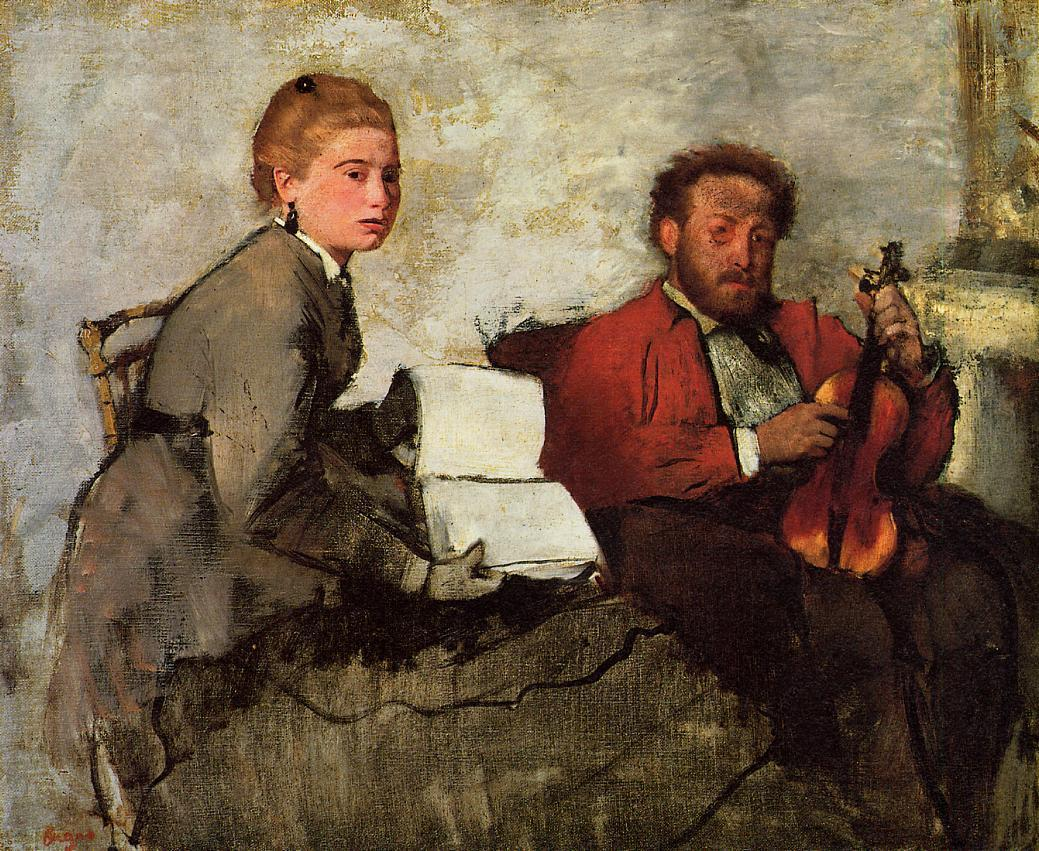
Violinist and Young Woman, c. 1871

In the late 1860s, Edgar Degas received permission from the Paris Opera to sketch the ballet dancers and orchestra musicians backstage and during rehearsals. He knew Lorenzo Pagans, who had been a celebrated tenor in Paris for several years and also gave recitals in private salons. Edgar Degas could hear Pagans not only at his father's house but also at the house of his friend Manet, where the singer was also a guest. Édouard Manet also created a portrait of the singer in 1879 with the small-format Portrait of Monsieur Pagans (private collection). It is possible that Manet's 1860 painting The Spanish Singer (Metropolitan Museum of Art, New York) was a model for Degas's depiction of Lorenzo Pagans in a double portrait with his father. The musician portrayed by Manet is also shown singing and playing the guitar but in a folkloric setting.

Related pictures by Édouard Manet

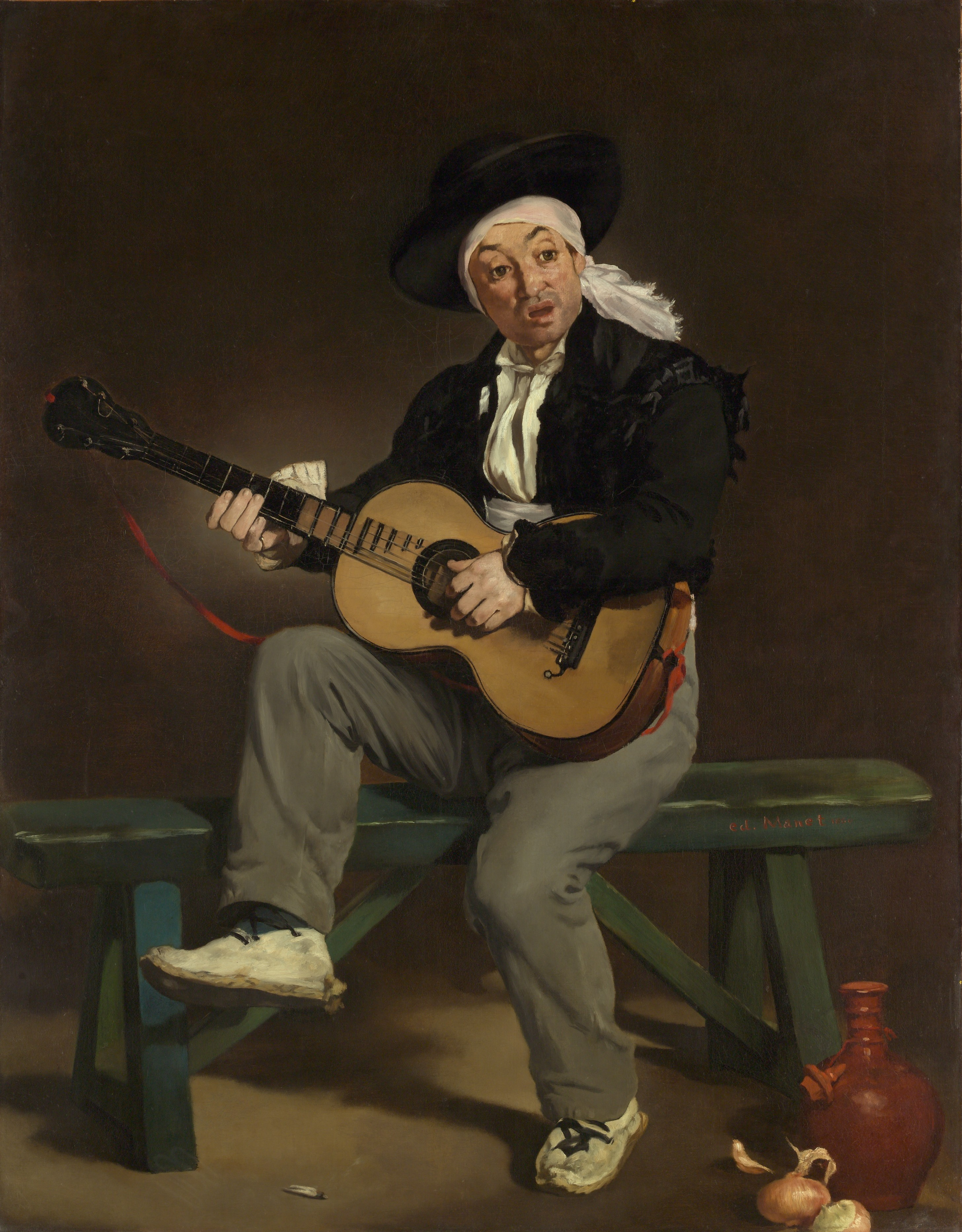
The Spanish Singer, 1860

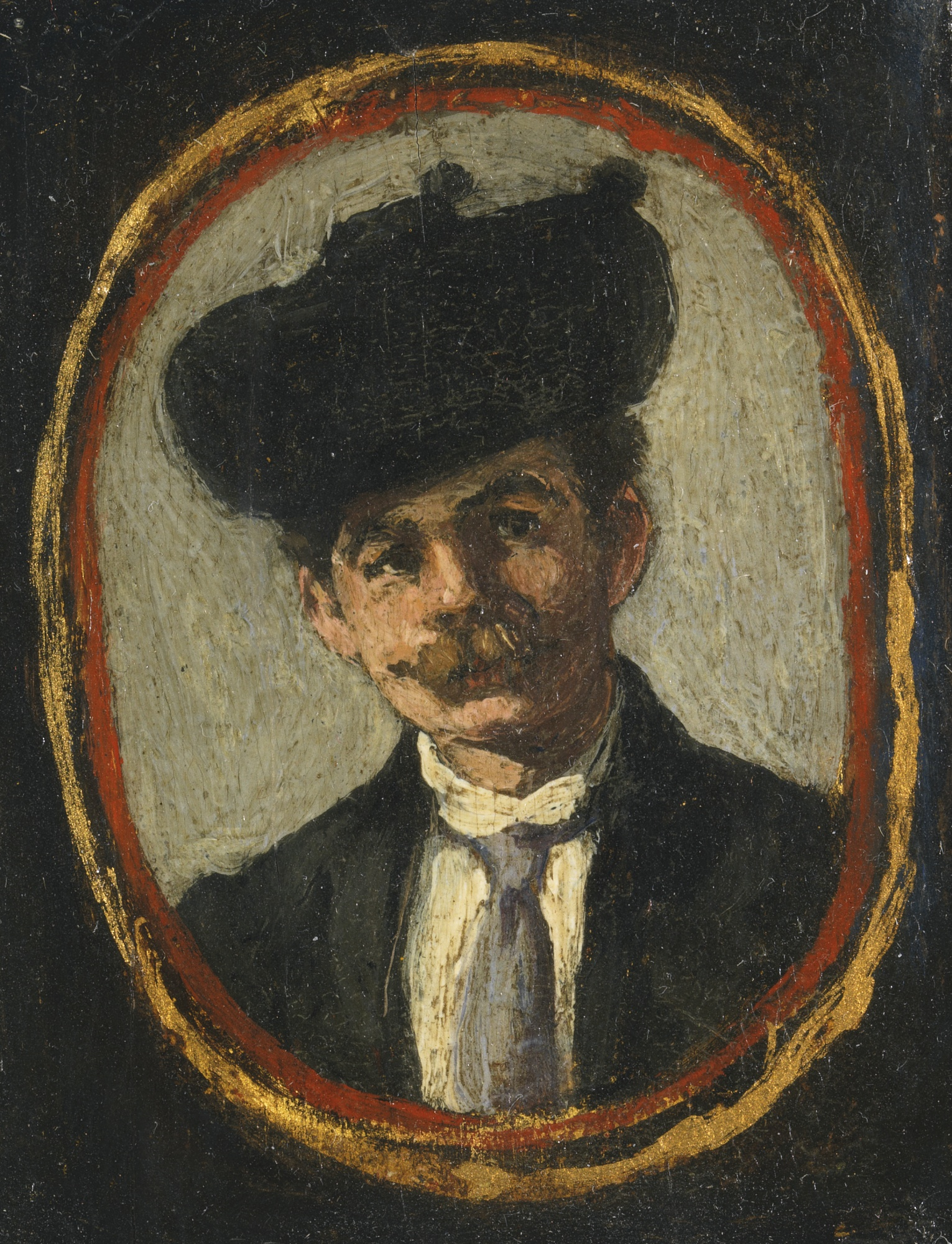
Portrait of Monsieur Pagans, 1879

From a French perspective, the guitar was considered a typical Spanish instrument, along with the castanets and the tambourine. A Spanish fashion, which could be observed in France from the middle of the 19th century, was triggered not least by the Empress Eugénie, who came from Spain. Accordingly, Spanish dancers and musicians appeared with great success on the Parisian stages, some of them delighting the audience with folkloristic performances, others excelling in the classical repertoire. While in 18th-century paintings, such as those of Antoine Watteau or Nicolas Lancret, the guitar can be seen being played by the common people, in the 19th century its reputation changed to that of a noble instrument. Pagans was known for singing Spanish songs, one of which he may be performing in the painting Lorenzo Pagans and Auguste de Gas, accompanying himself on the guitar. He also played works from the classical repertoire in private salons, including pieces by Jean-Philippe Rameau, as the Goncourt brothers recalled.

== Origin ==
The painting Lorenzo Pagans and Auguste de Gas was in the possession of Edgar Degas until his death in 1917. He cherished the painting and kept it in his bedroom above his bed, where only a few friends saw it. The painting was inherited by the artist's brother, René de Gas. After his death, his daughter, Odette Nepveu-de Gas, inherited the painting. In 1933, the painting was donated to the Louvre by the Société des Amis du Louvre, with the help of the art critic Marcel Guérin and the patron David David-Weill. From 1947, the painting was exhibited at the Jeu de Paume in Paris and has been part of the Musée d'Orsay collection since 1986.
