= Berthe Morisot with a Fan =

c. 1870 painting by Édouard Manet

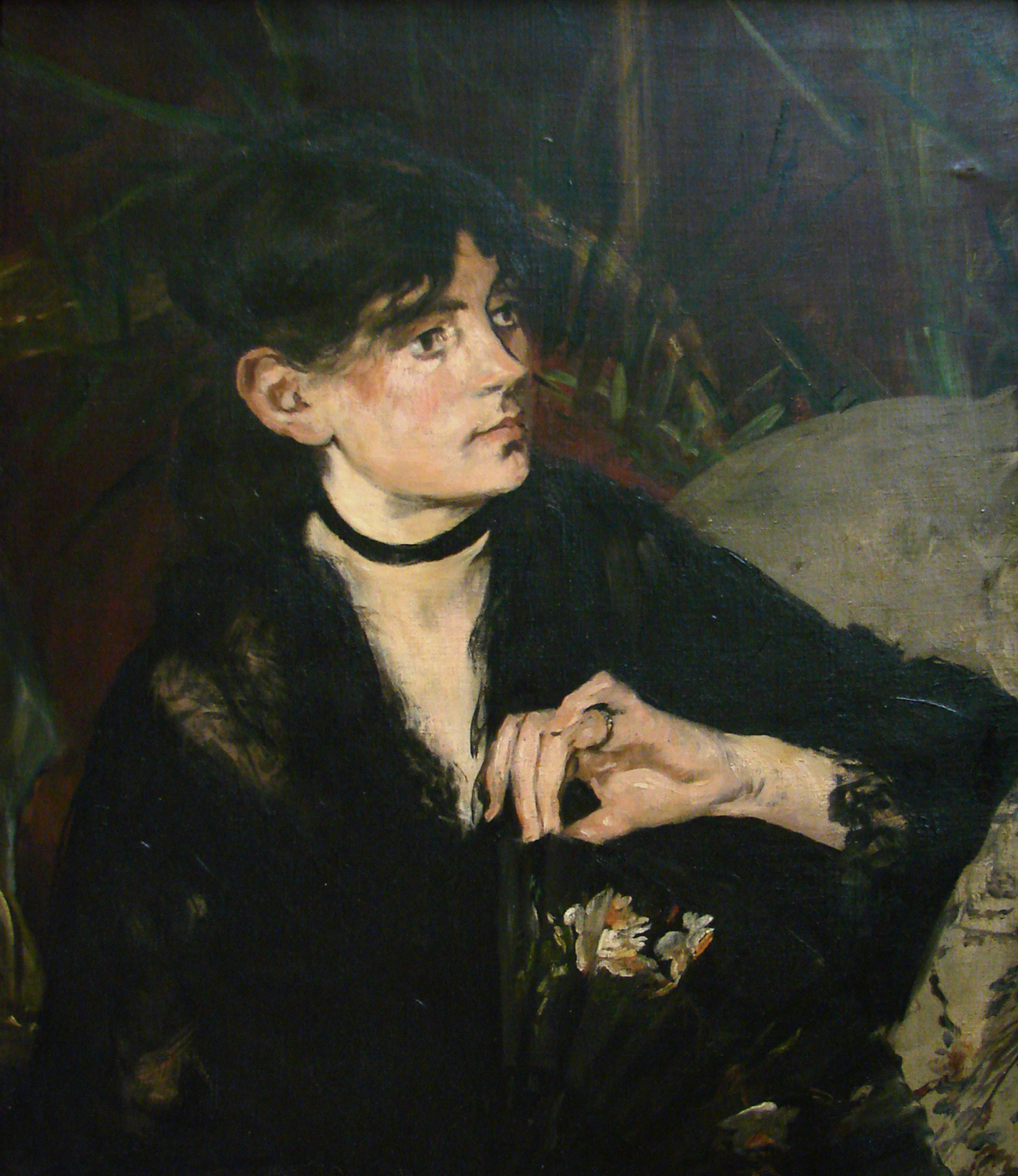
- Artist: Édouard Manet
- Year: 1874
- Medium: Oil on canvas
- Subject: Berthe Morisot
- Dimensions: 61.5 cm × 50 cm (24.2 in × 20 in)
- Location: Palais des Beaux-Arts de Lille, Lille

Berthe Morisot with a Fan is a painting by French artist Édouard Manet, executed in 1874. It belongs to the collection of the Musée d'Orsay, in Paris, but since 2000 it is in loan to the Palais des Beaux-Arts de Lille.

== History and description ==
It is the last of the twelve portraits that Manet produced of fellow painter and model Berthe Morisot, between 1868 and 1874, made just after her marriage to the painter's brother Eugène, after which she no longer posed for him. It shows Berthe in mourning for the death of her father, and therefore dressed in black, but wearing an engagement ring. The velvet ribbon around her neck and the lace on her dress contrast with her light skin. Even her eyes are black, although they were actually green. A wedding ring is clearly visible on her hand holding a fan decorated with flowers. This detail and the use of color demonstrate the influence of Spanish artists such as Diego Velázquez and Francisco Goya, whom Manet greatly admired. This influence can also be seen in other portraits of Morisot, like Berthe Morisot with a Bouquet of Violets. The background with the plant motif is a reference to the Japanese art that was fashionable at the time.

The portrait seems to have been conceived as a kind of farewell between Manet and his model; she doesn't look at his direction, unlike in his previous portraits.

== Provenance ==
The portrait entered Morisot's own collection, possibly directly from the artist, before being donated to the French state in 1999. It was initially allocated to the Musée d'Orsay, in Paris, before being moved in 2000 to the Palais des Beaux-Arts de Lille, where it still hangs.

== See also ==
- List of paintings by Édouard Manet
- 1874 in art
