= Alice Bailly =

Swiss artist (1872–1938)

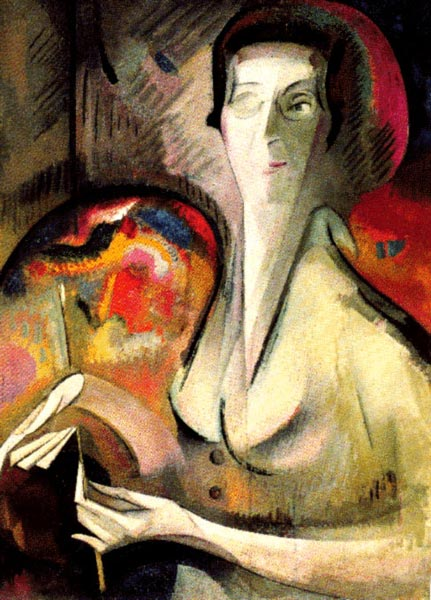
- Self Portrait 1917
- Born: 25 February 1872; Geneva, Switzerland
- Died: 1 January 1938 (aged 65); Lausanne, Switzerland
- Known for: Painting

Alice Bailly (25 February 1872 – 1 January 1938) was a Swiss avant-garde painter, known for her interpretations on cubism, fauvism, futurism, her wool paintings, and her participation in the Dada movement. In 1906, Bailly had settled in Paris where she befriended Juan Gris, Francis Picabia, and Marie Laurencin, avant-garde modernist painters who influenced her works and her later life.

== Family and background ==
Originally, the family name was Bally, but after a critic mistook her name for "Bolly" in a review she had it changed to "Bailly" to avoid further confusions. She was born to a modestly situated family in Geneva, Switzerland. Bailly's father, who worked as a Post Office official, died when Bailly was fourteen. Her mother, a German teacher, taught Bailly and her two sisters to be cultured and full of energy.

== Education and early career ==
At seventeen, she attended the École des Beaux-Arts and took women's-only courses. She believed that the purpose of the school was to develop her individual talent, not introduce their ideas to her. During her time there she studied under Hugues Bovy and Denise Sarkiss. She won a scholarship to study at the Academy of Fine Arts, Munich, Germany, but after a disastrous and short-lived stint in class she spent the rest of her time studying Rubens, Van Dyck, and other master artists at the Munich Art Gallery. Bailly spent a couple of years back in Geneva, working on painting and wood engraving (with limited success). In 1904, at the age of thirty-two, Bailly moved to Paris, where she befriended a number of notable modernist painters such as Juan Gris, Francis Picabia, Albert Gleizes, Jean Metzinger, Fernand Léger, Sonia Lewitska and Marie Laurencin. The following year Bailly was invited to spend a couple of weeks at the Villa Médicis-Libre, a sanctuary for artists that had not had the privilege of having a formal arts education in Rome.

== Inspiration and Fauvism ==
While in Paris exhibiting her wood engravings, she became interested in Fauvism. What drew Bailly to fauvism was the "style's bold use of intense colors, dark outlines, and emphatically unrealistic anatomy and space." Her paintings in this style were eventually shown in the Salon d'Automne in 1908 along with many other distinguished Fauve painters.

== Cubism and wool paintings ==
In 1912, Bailly's work was chosen to represent Swiss artists in an exhibit that traveled through Russia, England, and Spain. After this, she became immersed in Futuristic aesthetics and the avant-garde. At the start of World War I, Bailly returned to her native country of Switzerland and invented her signature "wool paintings," which were her own variations of Cubism. The style consisted of short strands of colored yarn that acted as brush strokes. She made about 50 of these wool paintings between 1913 and 1922.

== Dadaism ==
During World War I, the Dada phenomenon came about, with which Bailly was briefly involved. The movement, beginning in Switzerland, consisted of a variety of art forms and aimed to provoke violent reactions out of its viewers, not to please the public eye. Many believe modern performance art was developed because of this movement.

== Salon de Independents ==
The Salon de Independents was established in 1884 for artists who did not meet traditional standards of artistic style at the time. The society was open to everyone and allowed female artists a venue to exhibit their works. Alice Bailly was regularly exhibited in the society, along with many other female artists specializing in cubism. Pieces featured in the 1913 Salon de Independents, as well as those at the 1914 Salon d'Automne were criticized in her home of Geneva as being "humbug, or worse, cerebral devagations provoking ocular disease and headaches."

== Famous works ==
Bailly's most famous work is said to be her painting titled Self Portrait, painted in 1917. The painting represents a more avant-garde approach to self-portraits than was normally accepted at her time. The painting incorporates many styles. Her three-quarter-turned pose indicates a traditional self-portrait, while the red, orange and blue hues show Fauve influences. When looking at her arms and hands, the arching lines represent the influence of Italian Futurist art.

Some of her other notable works include At the Ball (1927), The Battle of Tolochenaz (1916), Geneva Harbor (1915), Landscape at Orsay (1912), and Vacation (1922).

== Later life ==
In 1923 she moved to Lausanne and remained there until her death. In 1936, the Theatre of Lausanne commissioned her to paint eight large murals for the foyer. This daunting task led to the exhaustion which many speculate contributed to her death in 1938 of tuberculosis. In her will, she established a trust fund to aid young Swiss artists with the money made through the sale of her art.

== Retrospective exhibitions ==
- Alice Bailly: Exposition du Centenaire, Kunsthalle Bern, Bern, Switzerland, 1933
- Alice Bailly: Exposition du Centenaire, Musée de l’Athénée, Geneva, Switzerland, 1932
