= In the Dining Room =

Painting by Berthe Morisot

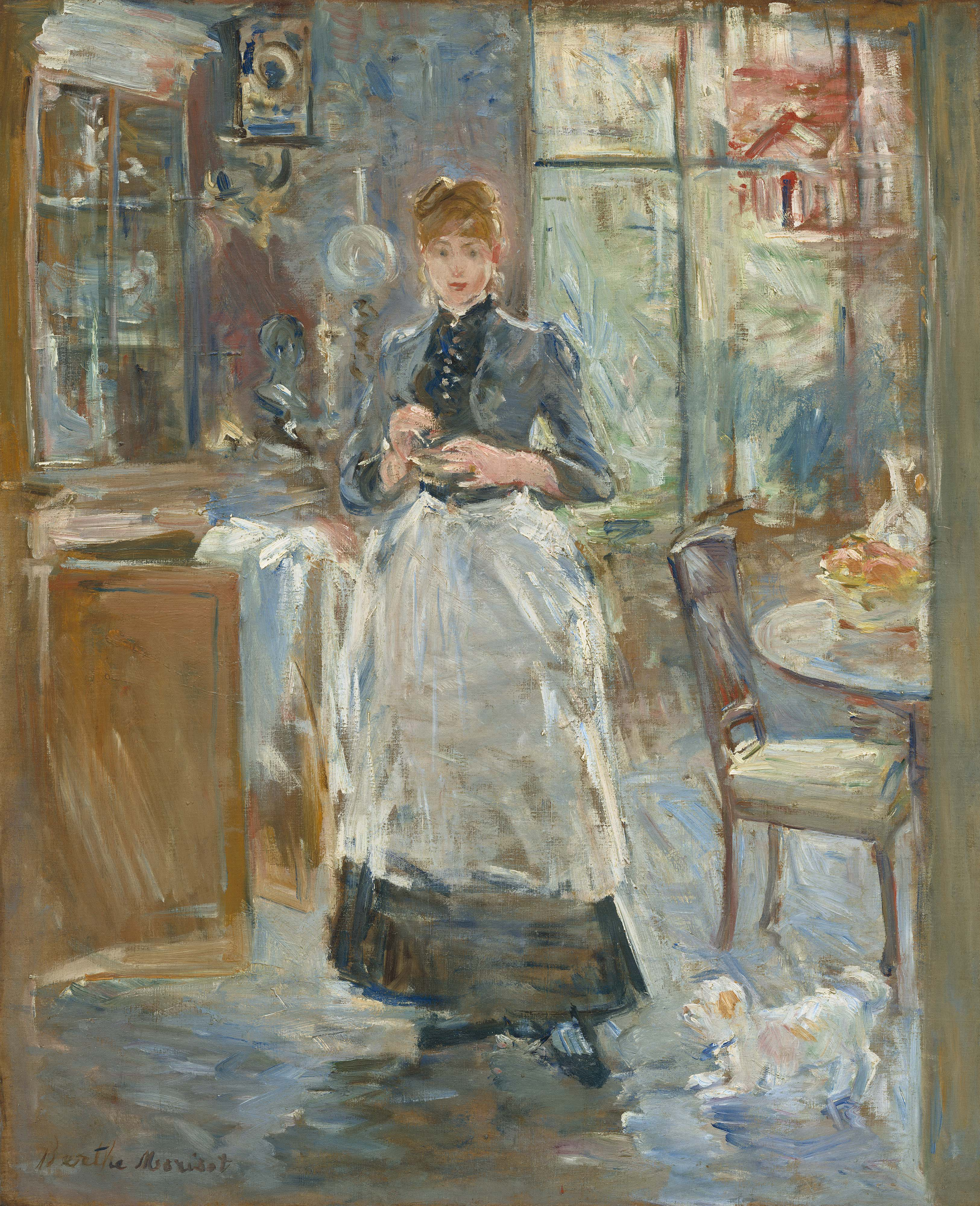
- Artist: Berthe Morisot
- Year: 1886
- Medium: Oil on canvas
- Dimensions: 61.3 cm × 50 cm (24.1 in × 20 in)
- Location: National Gallery of Art; Washington, D.C.

In the Dining Room is an oil-on-canvas painting by the French impressionist artist Berthe Morisot, created in 1886. It shows a young woman in the center of the domestic environment of a dining room. The painting is in the collection of the National Gallery of Art, in Washington, D.C.

== History ==
Morisot was always highly regarded as a woman in the world of the Impressionists. Where her predominantly male colleagues, however, usually took inspiration in the modern city life, going into streets and cafes, painting parks and bridges, she, like Mary Cassatt, for example, often opted for the depiction of indoor domestic subjects. Morisot often chose acquaintances and relatives as models. It suited her role as a woman in society of her time, no matter how progressive and emancipated she was.

Morisot exhibited In the Dining Room at the eighth and last major Impressionist exhibition in 1886. Critics mainly commented on her wild, streaky working method, which had never appeared so emphatically in her work before. Reviews for this painting were both positive and negative. Some called it "unfinished", while the critic Jules-Antoine Castagnary, on the other hand, wrote of the painting that Morisot had an extraordinary artistic feeling.

== Description ==
The painting shows a centrally positioned young woman wearing an ankle-length black skirt and a short grey-blue jacket. She has tied a white apron around her waist, which accentuates her domestic role, apparently as a maid. Her hands are busy with something, but its not quite clear what it is. On the left, there is a cluttered display cabinet with glassware and porcelain, while on the right stands a table with fruit, similar to a small still life. A little dog is barking in the crouching position, at the bottom right. The wall in the background is shown in blue, pink, purple and brown tones, while the window on the right appears in transparent white green, yellow and gray strips. Through the window, there are houses with bright red roofs. The multi-colouredness of the work is displayed with hasty brushstrokes in all directions that leave a semblance of blur in several places.

The streaky effect gives the work an appearance of movement, unrest and complexity. Morisot, however, simultaneously manages to bring a certain calm to the painting, through the choice and elaboration of the domestic theme. The young woman looks relaxed at the viewer, barely posing. Her role as a waitress is not emphasized, almost on the contrary. She comes across as friendly, charming and cordial and seems to welcome the viewer. In addition, Morisot arouses a certain curiosity about who the woman really is. She intrigues, with Morisot consciously using her wild, bristly style, characteristic of her later period, to enhance her emotional charge.

== Provenance ==
In the Dining Room was part of the collection of the French art collector Eugène Blot at the beginning of the 20th century. It was later owned by American art collectors, including the wealthy banker Chester Dale, from whose estate it came to the National Gallery of Art in 1963.
