= 1861 in art =

Events from the year 1861 in art.

== Events ==
- February – Hilda Sjölin opens a photography studio in Malmö, making her one of the first known Swedish female professional photographers.
- April – Morris, Marshall, Faulkner & Co., "Fine Art Workmen in Painting, Carving, Furniture and the Metals", set up in London by William Morris, P. P. Marshall, Charles Faulkner, Ford Madox Brown, Edward Burne-Jones, Dante Gabriel Rossetti and Philip Webb to craft Pre-Raphaelite-inspired furnishings.
- May 6 – The Royal Academy Exhibition of 1861 opens at the National Gallery in London
- July 15 – English painter Joanna Mary Boyce dies aged 29 from complications following the birth of her third child, leaving her paintings Bird of God and Undine uncompleted (the latter being finished by her widower Henry Tanworth Wells); Dante Gabriel Rossetti makes a drawing of her on her deathbed.
- date unknown
  - Paul Cézanne arrives in Paris to join his friend Émile Zola; while there he meets Camille Pissarro.
  - Berthe Morisot becomes a pupil of Corot.
  - Édouard Manet has his first paintings accepted by the Salon (Paris) (The Spanish Singer and Portrait of M. and Mme. Auguste Manet).
  - William Bell Scott concludes his series of murals of Northumbrian history at Wallington Hall with Iron and Coal, the Nineteenth Century.

== Works ==
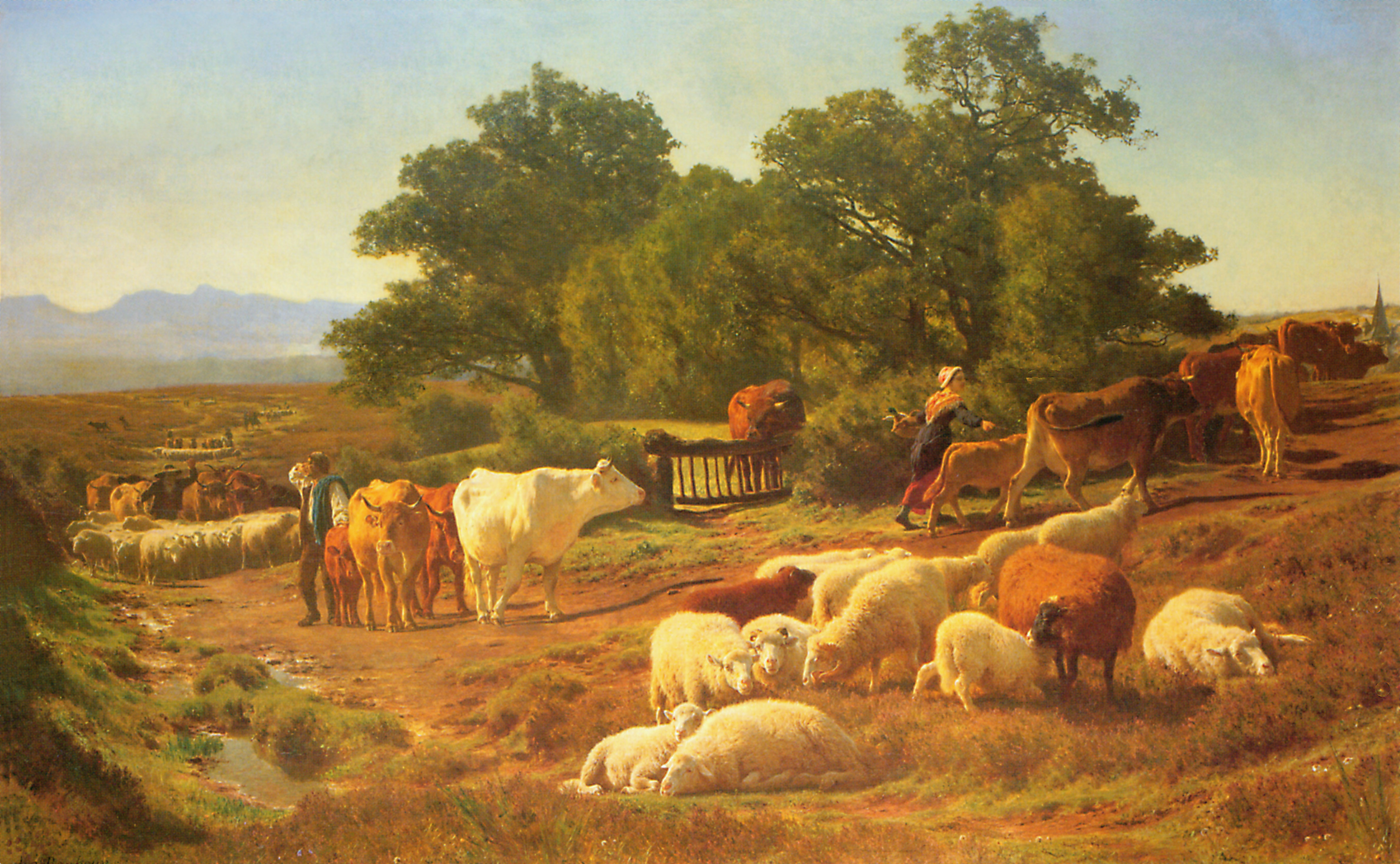
Auguste Bonheur – La Sortie du pâturage

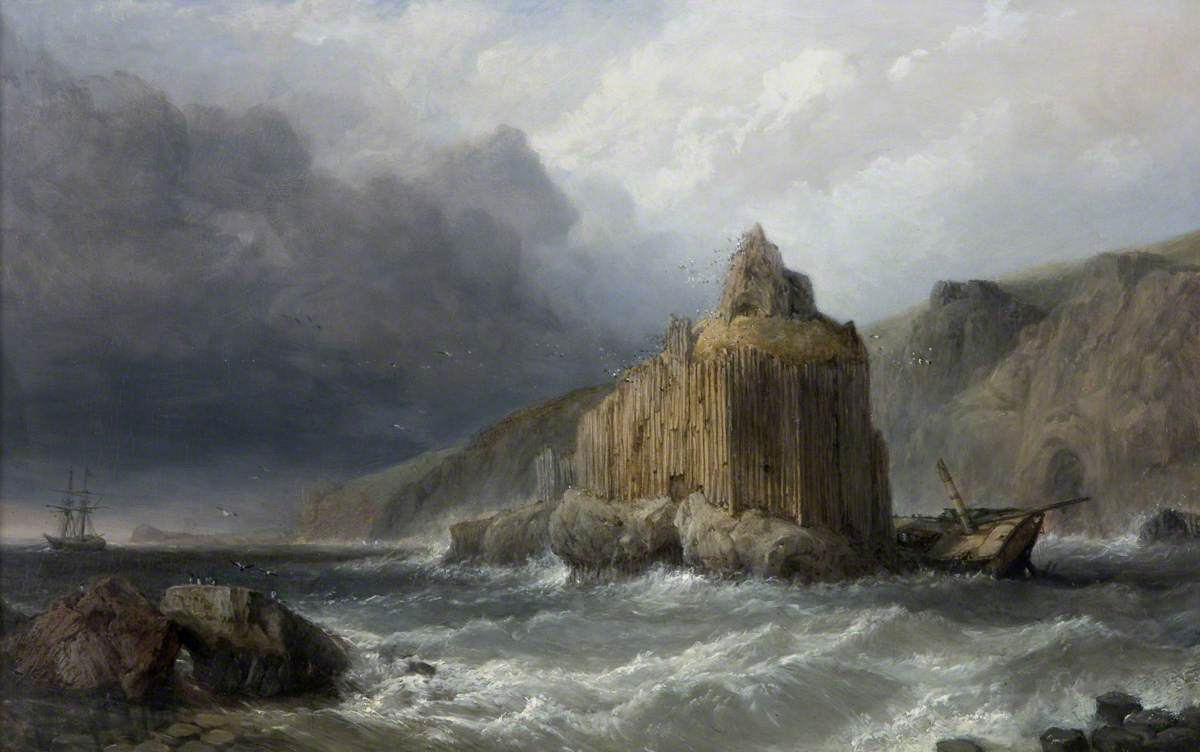
Stack Rock, County Antrim by Clarkson Stanfield

- Lawrence Alma-Tadema – The Education of the Children of Clovis
- Richard Ansdell – The Hunted Slaves
- John Bell – Crimean War Memorial (London)
- Auguste Bonheur – La Sortie du pâturage ("The Way to Market")
- Joanna Mary Boyce
  - Bird of God
  - Head of a Mulatto Woman
- Frederic Edwin Church
  - The Icebergs
  - Oosisoak
- Edgar Degas – Semiramis Building Babylon
- Édouard Dubufe – Portrait of Mathilde Bonaparte
- Jean-Léon Gérôme – Phryne before the Areopagus
- Gustave Achille Guillaumet – Arab Ploughing with Camels in the Evening Landscape
- George Elgar Hicks – Billingsgate Fish Market
- James Clarke Hook – Compass'd by the Inviolate Sea
- Thomas Dow Jones – Abraham Lincoln (bust)
- Daniel Maclise – The Meeting of Wellington and Blücher after the Battle of Waterloo (wall painting in Palace of Westminster, 1860-61)
- Édouard Manet
  - Boy Carrying a Sword
  - La Nymphe surprise
- Albert Joseph Moore – The Mother of Sisera Looked out a Window
- John Morgan – Gentlemen of the Jury
- Joseph Noel Paton – Dawn: Luther at Erfurt – Justification by Faith
- Henry Nelson O'Neil – The Parting Cheer
- Franz Xaver Reich – Mother Kinzig
- David Roberts – The Houses of Parliament from Millbank
- Dante Gabriel Rossetti
  - Fair Rosamund
  - Lucrezia Borgia
- Rebecca Solomon
  - The Arrest of a Deserter
  - The Young Teacher
- Clarkson Stanfield – Stack Rock, County Antrim
- Jean-Baptiste-Ange Tissier – Napoleon III Freeing Abd el Kader
- Karl von Piloty – Nero Dancing Upon the Ruins of Rome
- Karl Ferdinand Wimar – murals in Rotunda of Courthouse, St. Louis, Missouri
- Adolphe Yvon – The Battle of Solferino

== Births ==
- January 21 – Đorđe Jovanović, Serbian sculptor (died 1953)
- February 1 – Jacques-Émile Blanche, French painter (died 1942)
- April 9 – Charles Holroyd, English etcher (died 1917)
- June 19 – Carl Seffner, German portrait sculptor (died 1932)
- June 29 – Pedro Figari, Uruguayan painter, lawyer, writer and politician (died 1938)
- July 18 – Lucien Simon, French painter and teacher (died 1945)
- August 9 – J. W. Godward, English Neoclassical painter (suicide 1922)
- August 17 – Ludwig von Hofmann, German Impressionist painter (died 1945)
- October 4 – Frederic Remington, American painter, illustrator, sculptor and writer (died 1909)
- October 15 – Nels N. Alling, Danish-American sculptor (died 1955)
- October 30 – Antoine Bourdelle, French sculptor (died 1929)
- December 8
  - Aristide Maillol, French sculptor, painter and printmaker (died 1944)
  - Georges Méliès, French filmmaker (died 1938)
- December 16 – Antonio de La Gándara, French painter, pastellist and draughtsman (died 1917)
- December 20 – Ivana Kobilca, Slovene realist painter (died 1926)
- date unknown – Kiyohara Tama, Sicily-based Japanese painter (died 1939)

== Deaths ==
- January 11 – Karl Altmann, German painter (born 1802)
- February 3 – Ferdinand Deppe, German naturalist, explorer and painter (born 1794)
- February 7 – Eduard Clemens Fechner, German portrait painter and an etcher (born 1799)
- February 9 – Francis Danby, Irish-born landscape painter (born 1793)
- March 10 (February 26 O.S.) – Taras Shevchenko, Ukrainian poet and artist (born 1814)
- April 14 – Utagawa Kuniyoshi, Japanese artist of the ukiyo-e style of woodblock prints and painting (born 1797)
- May 21 – Benjamin Paul Akers, American sculptor (born 1825)
- July 15 – Joanna Mary Boyce, English portrait, genre and landscape painter (born 1831)
- August 17 – Johann David Passavant, German painter and art curator (born 1787)
- September 22 – Alexei Yegorov, Russian painter (born 1776)
- November 26 – Wilhelm Hensel, German painter, husband of Fanny Hensel (born 1794)
- December 24 – Jean-Antoine-Siméon Fort, French oil and watercolor painter (born 1793)
- December 25 - Jacobus Josephus Eeckhout, Belgian historical and genre subjects painter (born 1793)
- date unknown – Andrew Hunt, English landscape painter (born 1790)
