= La Nymphe surprise =

1861 painting by Édouard Manet

La Nymphe surprise (Surprised Nymph)
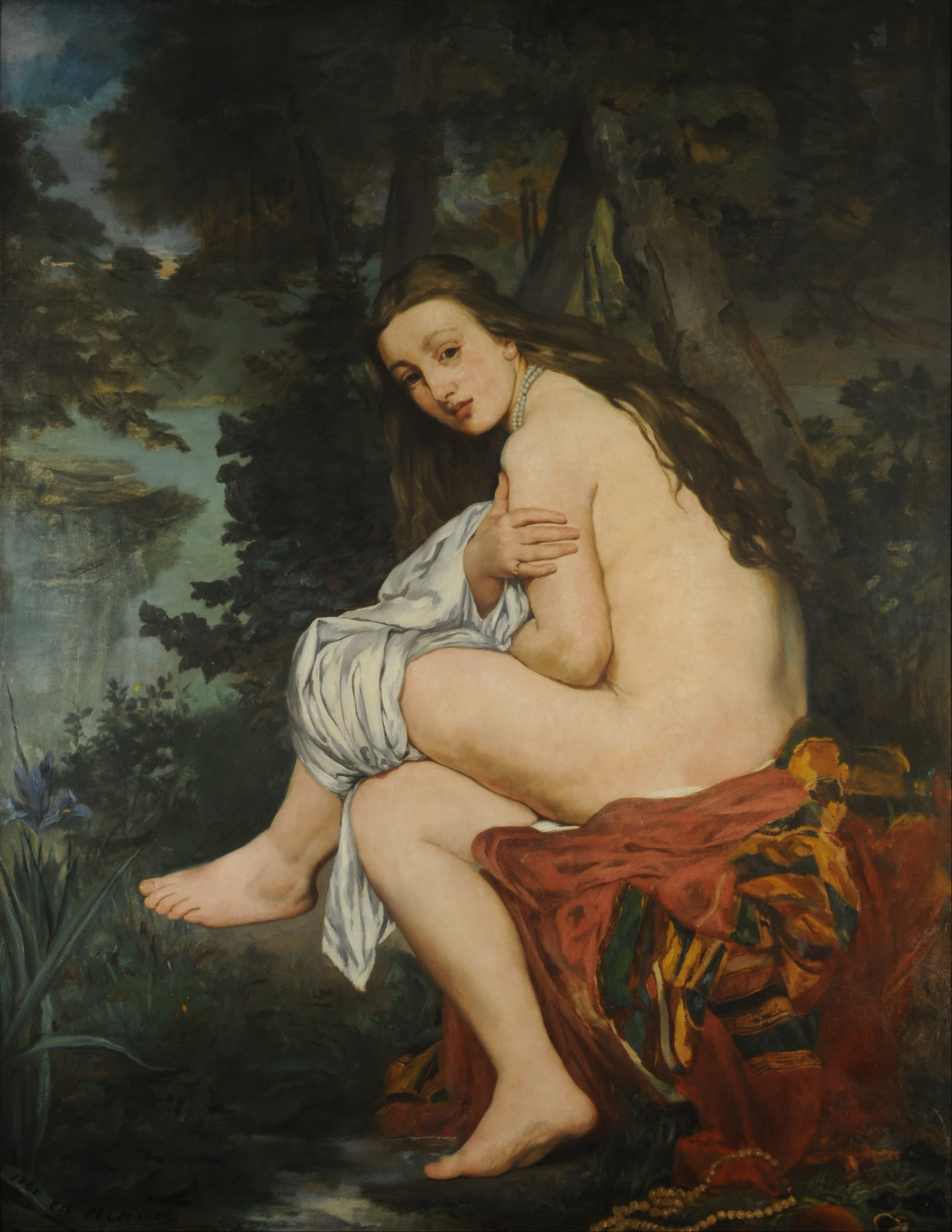
- Artist: Édouard Manet
- Year: 1861
- Medium: Oil on canvas
- Dimensions: 122 cm × 144 cm (48 in × 57 in)
- Location: National Museum of Fine Arts in Buenos Aires; Buenos Aires

La Nymphe surprise, or Surprised Nymph, is a painting by the French painter Édouard Manet, created in 1861. The model was Suzanne Leenhoff, a pianist whom he married two years later. The painting is a key work of Manet's, marking the beginning of a new period in his artistic career and generally in the history of modernism in French painting. It is in National Museum of Fine Arts in Buenos Aires and is considered one of the collection's highlights. La Nymphe surprise remained in the artist's possession his entire life, and there is evidence that, apart from the emotional significance it had for him, Manet considered this painting one of his most important.

== History ==
The model of the painting is Édouard Manet's lover, the Dutchwoman Suzanne Leenhoff, with whom he had a secret affair. This affair developed while the young Manet was still living in his parents' house, where Suzanne—who was three years Manet's senior—was engaged in 1849 as a piano teacher for Édouard and his brother Eugène. Their relationship was kept secret from his family. Manet and Suzanne married in 1863, the year after Manet's father died and two years after the completion of this painting. They remained married until Manet's death in 1883.

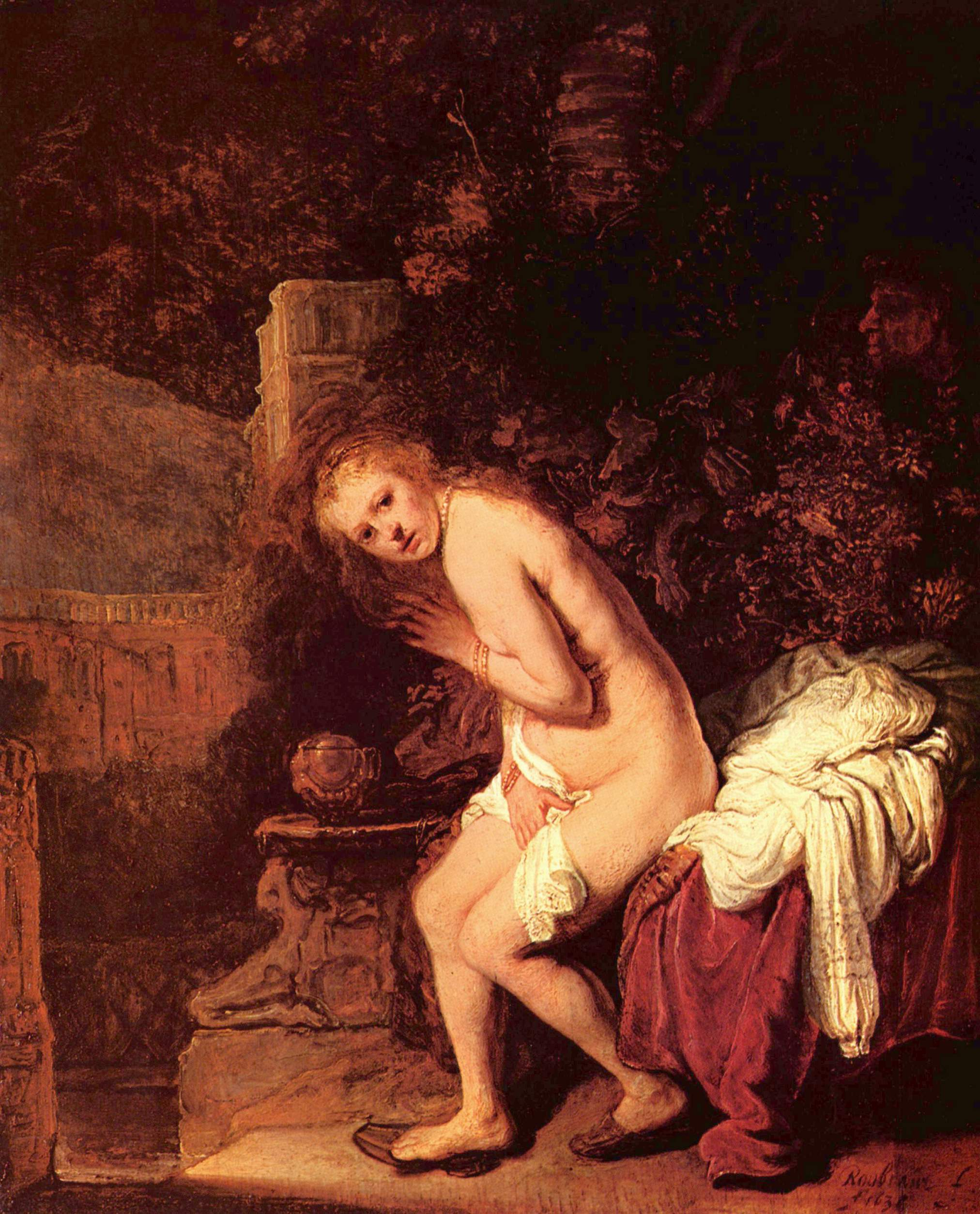
Rembrandt, Susanna and the Elders, 1647, Gemäldegalerie, Berlin

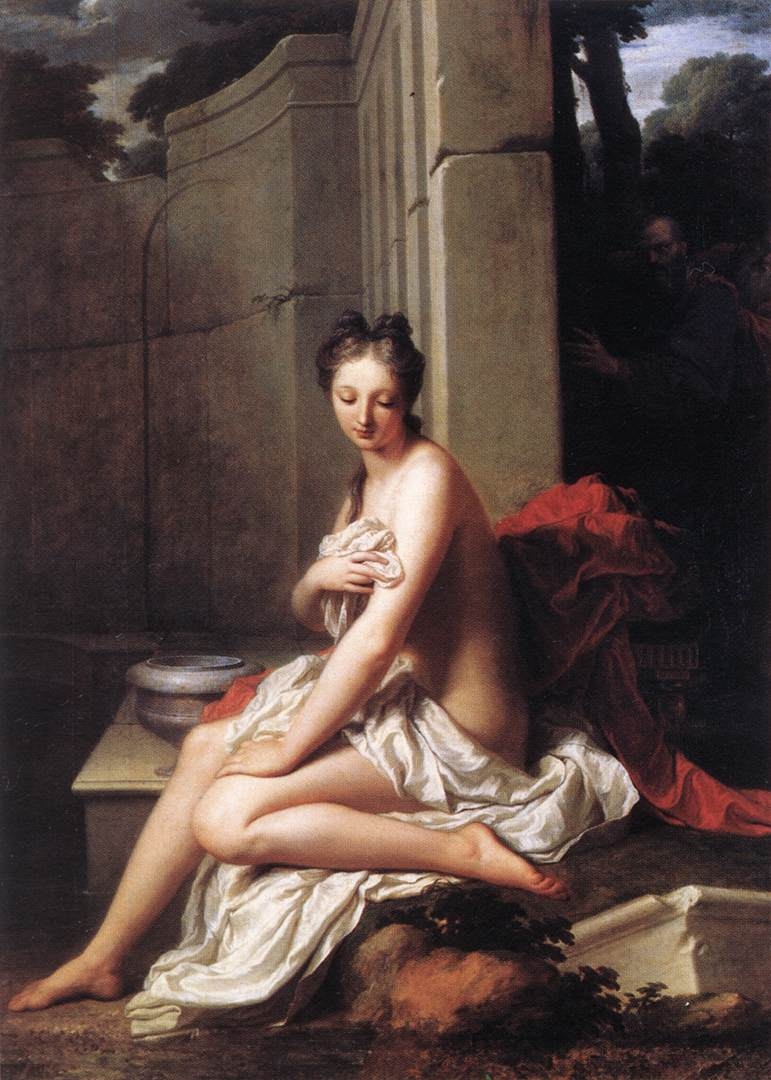
Jean-Baptiste Santerre, Susanna at the Bath, c. 1704, Louvre, Paris

In light of the model Suzanne Leenhoof's Dutch background, as well as her pose, the subject was notably compared to Rembrandt's Susanna and the Elders of 1647. In a different point, Jean-Baptiste Santerre's 1704 painting of the same subject was named as an influence

Nymphs were female spirits of nature, female deities from Greek mythology, often depicted as young women, who dwell in mountains and small woods, by springs and rivers. Several authors think that the motif is similar to Rembrandt's Susanna and the Elders, considering that the model's name is Suzanne, she was Dutch and the figure's pose is identical with the one in the painting. In a different point, Françoise Cachin argues that Manet was probably inspired by Jean-Baptiste Santerre's 1704 painting of the same subject, pointing out the position of the arm and the treatment of the material.

Manet kept this painting in his atelier. The painting was exhibited at the Salon des Artistes Français in 1865. This painting was painted two years before the Le Déjeuner sur l'herbe (The Luncheon on the Grass) and Olympia. The painting was purchased by the National Museum of Fine Arts in Buenos Aires and was placed on display at the Museum, as one of the institution's highlights.

== Painting ==
Manet's La Nymphe surprise depicts a young woman sitting in a wooded landscape beside a lake, looking surprised at the viewer. There is a blue iris growing near her left foot, and she wears nothing on her body except white pearls around her neck and a ring on her little finger. The nymph's glance, contrary to Olympia's provocative look, is surprised and shy, as if she has found the viewer watching her, invading her privacy, disturbing her.

== See also ==
- List of paintings by Édouard Manet
- 1861 in art
- Boy Carrying a Sword, depicting Suzanne's son Leon Leenhoff
- The Reading
- Luncheon in the Studio
- Impressionism
- Nana
