= Christiane Schreiber =

Norwegian artist (1822–1898)

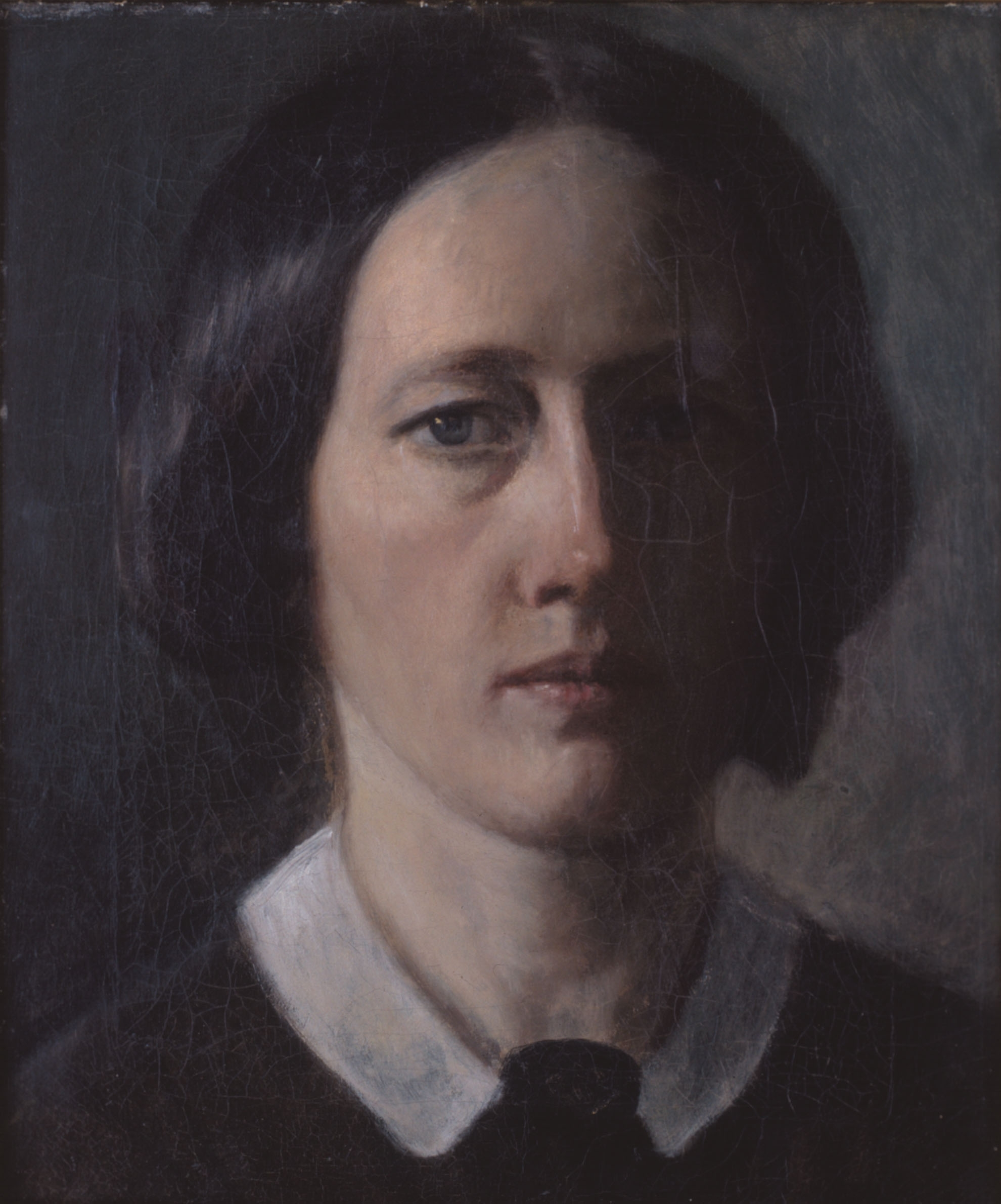
Self-portrait (circa 1870)

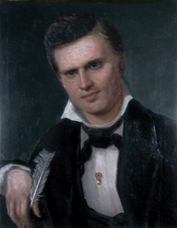
Portrait of Bjørnstjerne Bjørnson (1857)

Edele Christiane Margrethe Schreiber (4 October 1822, Voss - 23 November 1898, Oslo) was a Norwegian painter, known primarily for her portraits.

== Biography ==
Her father Peter August Schreiber (1788-1865) was originally from Roskilde, Denmark and came to Norway as a military officer. Her mother Christiane Margrethe Jersin, was the daughter of the Norwegian minister, Georg Burchard Jersin. She moved with her family to Bergen in 1832 and later to Stavanger where her father became a customs agent. In 1852, she went to Copenhagen and was apprenticed to Jørgen Roed.

Later, together with Aasta Hansteen, she was one of the first female students admitted to the Kunstakademie Düsseldorf, where she studied with Adolph Tidemand from 1854 to 1855. While there, she met the Swedish painter, Sofie Ribbing, who became her life partner.

In 1855, she had her first exhibit at the Oslo Kunstforening. Then, until 1857, she was in Paris, where she worked with Jean-Baptiste-Ange Tissier and briefly formed an artists' colony with Ribbing, Hansteen, Marie Aarestrup, Amalia Lindegren and others.

In 1858, she and Hansteen became the first female recipients of the Statens kunstnerstipend, a government study grant. She and Ribbing spent the years 1860-61 in Rome, where they stayed with their friend, Bjørnstjerne Bjørnson.

She had a major exhibit at the Exposition Universelle (1867). From 1876 to 1877, she was back in Rome with a grant from the "Schäffers Legat" for painters and sculptors. After that, she established herself permanently in Oslo. Among the portraits she completed at that time were those of King Oscar I and his wife, Queen Josephine of Leuchtenberg.
