= Bust of Abraham Lincoln (Indianapolis) =

Public artwork by Thomas Dow Jones

Abraham Lincoln
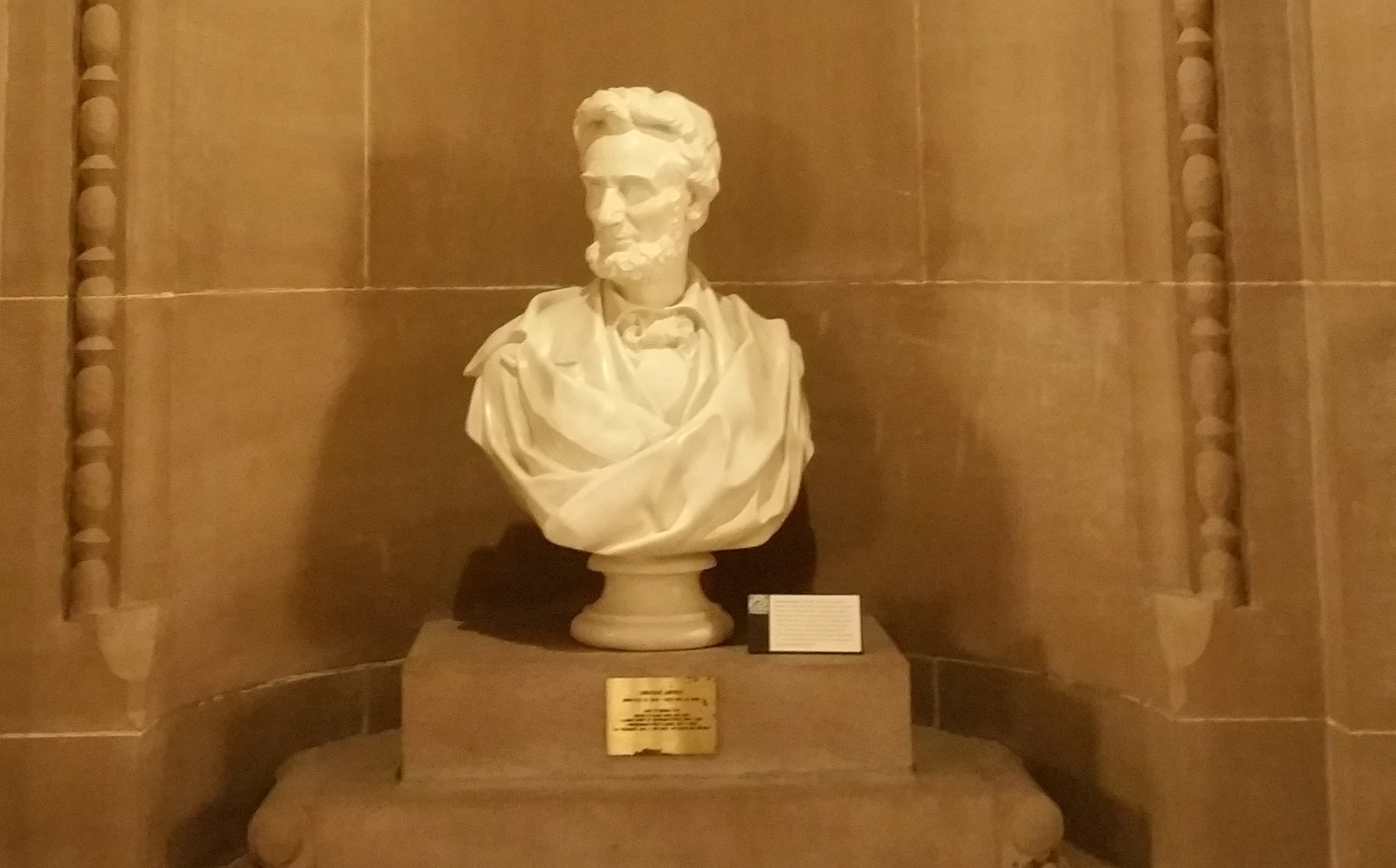
- Artist: Thomas Dow Jones
- Year: 1862
- Type: Plaster
- Dimensions: 83.82 cm × 63.5 cm × 45.72 cm (33 in × 25 in × 18 in)
- Location: Indiana Statehouse; Indianapolis

Abraham Lincoln is a public artwork by American sculptor and medallist Thomas Dow Jones, located in the Indiana Statehouse, Indianapolis, Indiana, United States. The painted plaster bust of Abraham Lincoln that resides in the Indiana Statehouse is a copy of an 1861 clay bust. Several versions of the bust exist in plaster, marble, and bronze mediums.

Thomas Dow Jones' original 1861 bust was re-sculpted (by the artist) into marble as part of the Lincoln Vicksburg Monument that was installed in the Ohio Statehouse in 1871. Another copy of the bust was cast into bronze and is part of the Southern Allghenies Museum of Art's permanent sculpture collection (74.011) in Altoona, Pennsylvania. Jones' bust of Lincoln is also in the permanent collection of the Smithsonian National Portrait Gallery (NPG.74.53) in Washington, D.C.

== Description ==
The white plaster bust depicts Abraham Lincoln in a left-facing quarter-profile; the figure is draped in a cape, wearing a suit and stock tie. The dimensions are as follows: height: 33 inches (84 cm), width: 25 inches (64 cm), length: 18 inches (46 cm). The bust is clearly inscribed Patented June 3, 1862 on the lower proper left. "TD Jones, sculptor" is inscribed on the bust's posterior center. As this is a copy of the original clay bust, the artist's signature on the posterior center is not clear. The bust is situated on a white, wooden base in the northeast exterior niche of the Indiana Statehouse rotunda. A gold plaque is located beneath the stone niche; although not attached to the sculpture, it describes the subject matter, reading:

Abraham Lincoln

Born Feb.12, 1809—Died Apr. 15, 1865
Came to Indiana 1816
Served in Black Hawk War, 1832
Illinois House of Representatives, 1834-1841
Congressman from Illinois, 1847-1849
U.S. President, Mar. 4, 1861 until his death Apr. 15, 1865

== Historical information ==
The Indiana Statehouse' plaster bust of Lincoln was patented June 3, 1862. Thomas Dow Jones' original bronze sculpture was cast in 1861 and is believed to be one of the earliest depictions of a bearded Abraham Lincoln.

Thomas Dow Jones was commissioned by the leading Republicans of Cincinnati to sculpt a portrait bust of president-elect Lincoln before his inauguration in March 1861. Jones arrived in Springfield on Christmas Day with letters of recommendation from two of his most recent clients, Ohio Governor Salmon P. Chase and Thomas Ewing (General William T. Sherman's father-in-law). Lincoln consented to sit for Thomas Dow Jones and gave him permission to sculpt the president-elect's likeness at the St. Nicholas Hotel in Springfield, Illinois until Lincoln's inauguration.

=== Location history ===
In its time at the Indiana Statehouse, Lincoln's bust has been moved to a number of niches around the rotunda. In 1943, it was located in the southeast corner pier facing east. In 1964, Lincoln's bust was moved again to the west side of the rotunda to allow Governor Henry F. Schricker's bust to be placed in a more prominent position facing the east door. The bust currently occupies the exterior northeast niche of the rotunda.

== Condition ==
According to the MIMSY XG Database employed by the Indiana State Museum, the condition of the bust is recorded as 'very good'; there are very few marks/scratches on the proper right and left sides of the bust.
