= The Reading (Manet) =

Painting by Édouard Manet

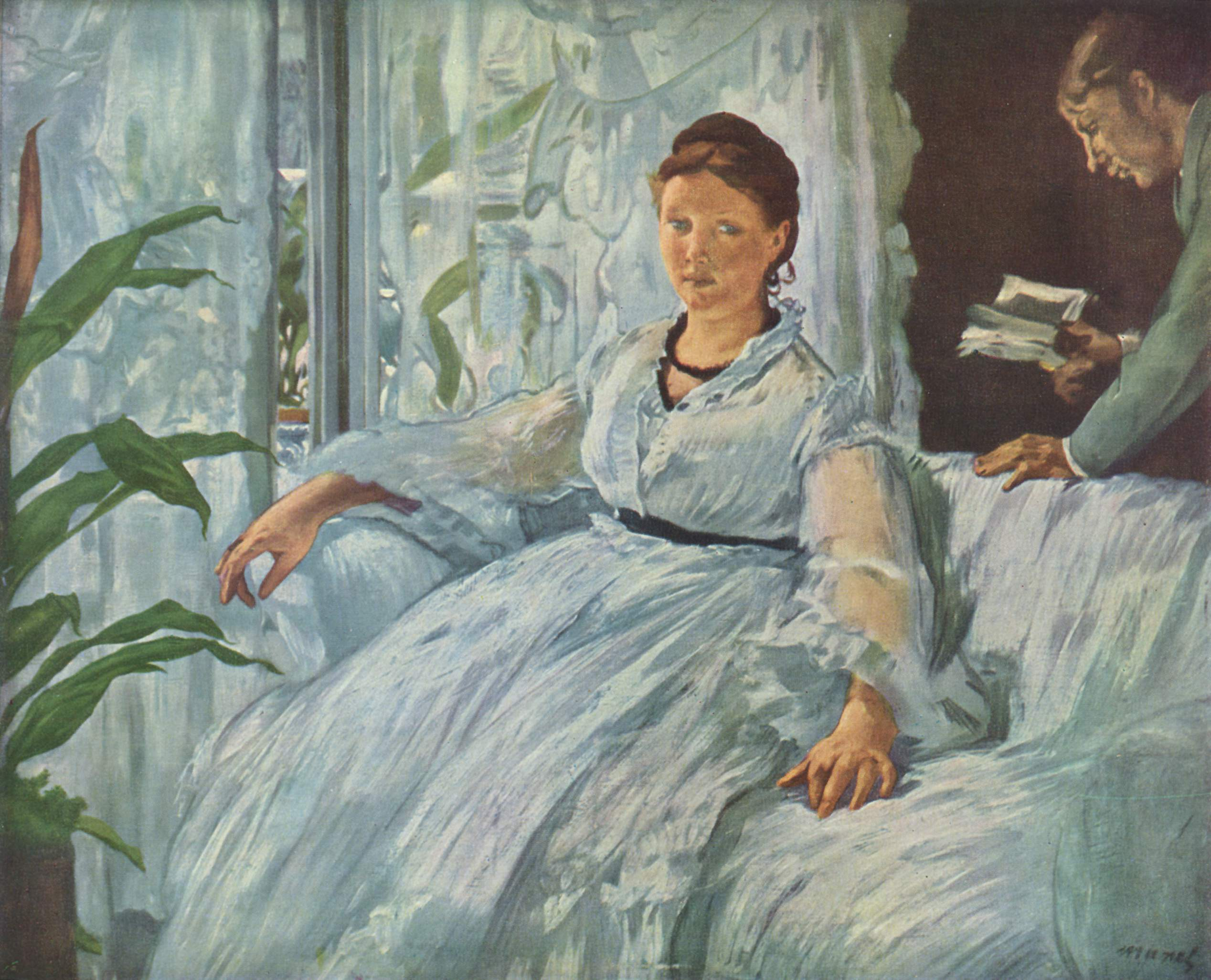
- Artist: Édouard Manet
- Year: 1865–1873
- Type: oil painting
- Dimensions: 61 cm × 74 cm (24 in × 29 in)
- Location: Musée d'Orsay; Paris

The Reading is an oil painting by French painter Édouard Manet depicting his wife Suzanne Leenhoff and son Léon, created c. 1865–1873.

== History ==
The painting was first exhibited in 1880 in one of the regular solo exhibitions mounted by Manet in his workshop. The picture was also part of the great posthumous exhibition of Manet's work in 1884, a year after his death.

The work first belonged to the private collection of Winnaretta Singer, Princess Edmond de Polignac, where it remained until 1944, after the death of the Princess. It was offered as a gift to the French State and deposited in the Musée du Louvre. In 1947, it was transferred to the Galerie nationale du Jeu de Paume, a showroom located in the Jardin des Tuileries and which belongs to the Louvre. It remained there until 1986, when, with the creation of the Musée d'Orsay, it was brought to this museum, like the rest of the collection of Impressionist paintings in the Louvre. It can currently be seen in the Musée d'Orsay, in room 31 of level 5.

== Analysis ==
The painting depicts the artist's wife, Suzanne Manet (née Leenhoff), seated, and their son, Léon, standing and reading a book. Léon was a recurrent model for Manet, who portrayed him in several pictures, such as The Lunch, Boy Carrying a Sword and Boy Blowing Bubbles.

In this work the white woman's dress dominates, and the sofa and curtains are treated with broad strokes of high brightness, in counterpoint to the dark tone of the belt and collar. According to Peter H. Feist, in this painting "Manet reacts more sensitive than usual, and looks especially to shades of white that are offered to his eyes".

Diana Seave Greenwald writes that The Reading "may have been inspired by Whistler's landmark Symphony in White, No. 1: The White Girl".

== See also ==
- List of paintings by Édouard Manet
