= Suzanne Manet =

Dutch pianist and art model (1829–1906)

- Édouard Manet – Mme Manet at the Piano (ca. 1868-69), Musée d'Orsay
- Born: Suzanne Leenhoff; 30 October 1829; Heerenveen, Netherlands
- Died: 8 March 1906 (aged 76)
- Occupation: Pianist
- Spouse: Édouard Manet (m. 1863; died 1883)
- Children: Léon-Edouard Koëlla

Suzanne Manet (UK: /ˈmæneɪ/, US: /mæˈneɪ, məˈ-/; née Leenhoff; 30 October 1829 – 8 March 1906) was a Dutch pianist and the wife of the painter Édouard Manet, for whom she frequently modelled.

== Life ==
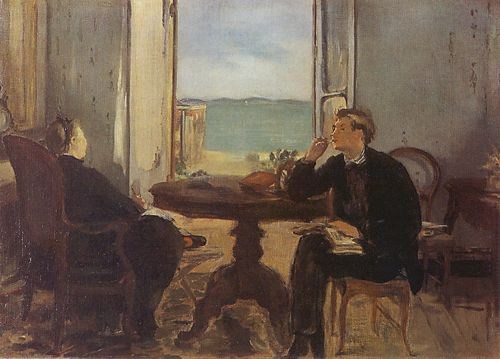
Édouard Manet – Interior at Arcachon (Mme Manet and Léon Leenhoff) (1871), Clark Art Institute

Suzanne Leenhoff was born in Heerenveen, the Netherlands. An excellent pianist, Leenhoff was initially hired in 1851 by Manet's father, Auguste, as a piano teacher for Édouard and his brothers. Auguste was a domineering figure in Édouard's life, insisting that his son study law and avoid the arts. In their early twenties, Suzanne and Édouard developed a personal relationship and were romantically involved for some ten years. After Édouard left his parents' home, he and Suzanne lived together, although they kept their relationship discreet and secret, especially from Édouard's father.

On 29 January 1852, Leenhoff gave birth out of wedlock to a son, Léon-Edouard Koëlla (also known as Léon Leenhoff). The birth certificate gave Leenhoff as the mother but "Koëlla" as the father, an individual never identified and likely invented. Léon was baptised in 1855, and became known as Suzanne's young brother. Suzanne and Édouard were finally married in October 1863, a year after the death of Édouard's father. Édouard never publicly confirmed Léon as his son. Some report that Léon's father could have been Édouard's own father, Auguste, and that Leenhoff may have been Auguste's mistress.

Léon posed often for Édouard Manet. Most famously, he is the subject of the Boy Carrying a Sword of 1861 (Metropolitan Museum of Art) and Boy Blowing Bubbles (Calouste Gulbenkian Museum). He also appears as the boy carrying a tray in the background of The Balcony.

== Portrait by Degas ==
Edgar Degas – M. and Mme Édouard Manet (1868–1869)

Édouard Manet and Edgar Degas met by chance at the Louvre in 1862, and after an intense conversation and Manet's demonstration on the art of etching, they became lifelong friends. Sometime in 1868 Degas painted a portrait of Manet and his wife. Manet is reclining on a couch and Suzanne appears to be seated at a piano. The mystery that surrounds the portrait by Degas is the fact that the painting has been slashed from top to bottom and right through the likeness of Suzanne. The supposition is that Manet, for an unknown reason, cut the painting. Manet might have slashed the painting because he did not like the way Suzanne was painted, or because he was feuding at the time with Degas, or he might have been angry with his wife. When Degas saw what had been done to his painting he demanded its return, and he took it back. Degas intended to re-paint the likeness of Suzanne at the piano and he reiterated his intention to Ambroise Vollard in conversation with him around the turn of the century. Degas never got around to fixing the painting and it remains in its slashed state in the Kitakyushu Municipal Museum of Art.

== Suzanne as a model ==
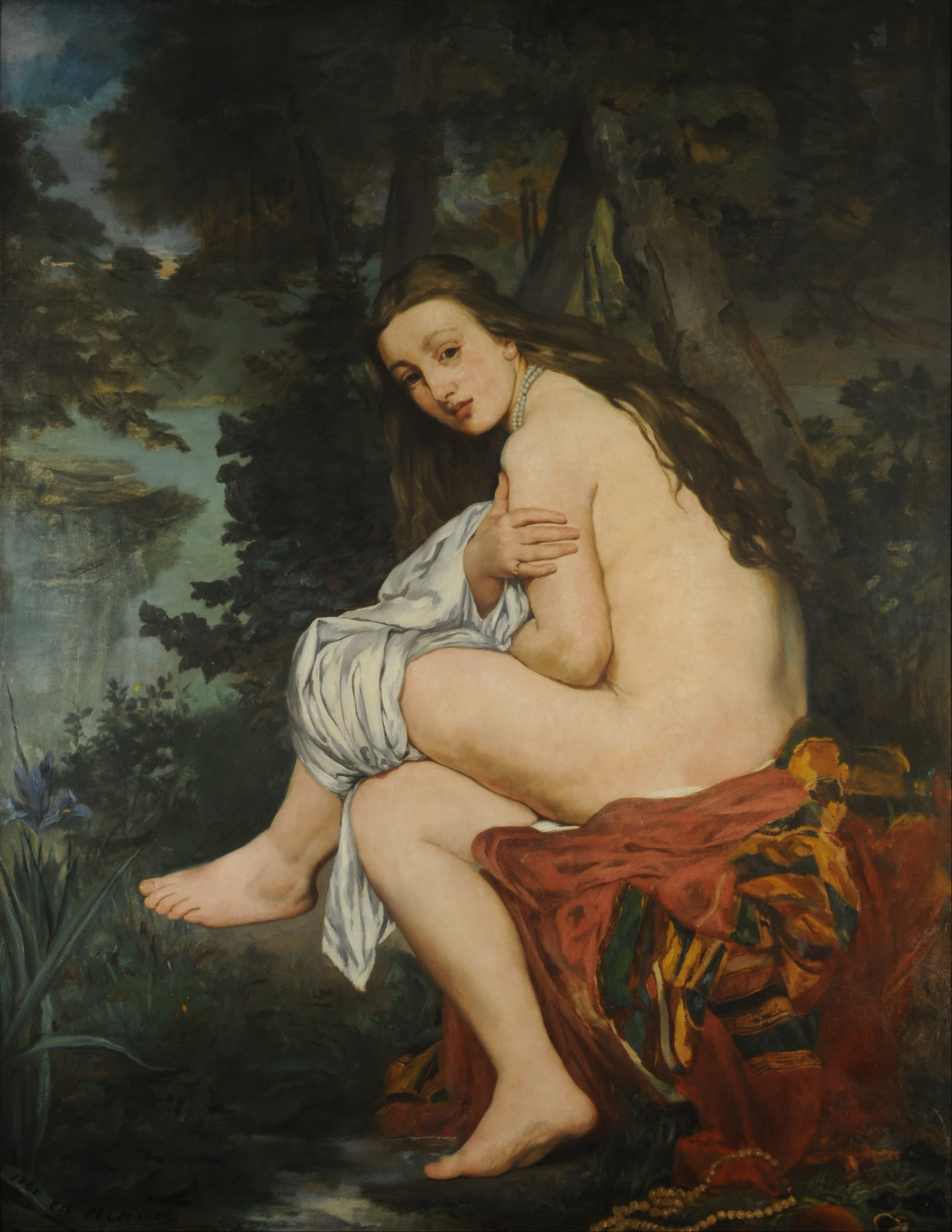
Édouard Manet – The Startled Nymph (1859-1861)

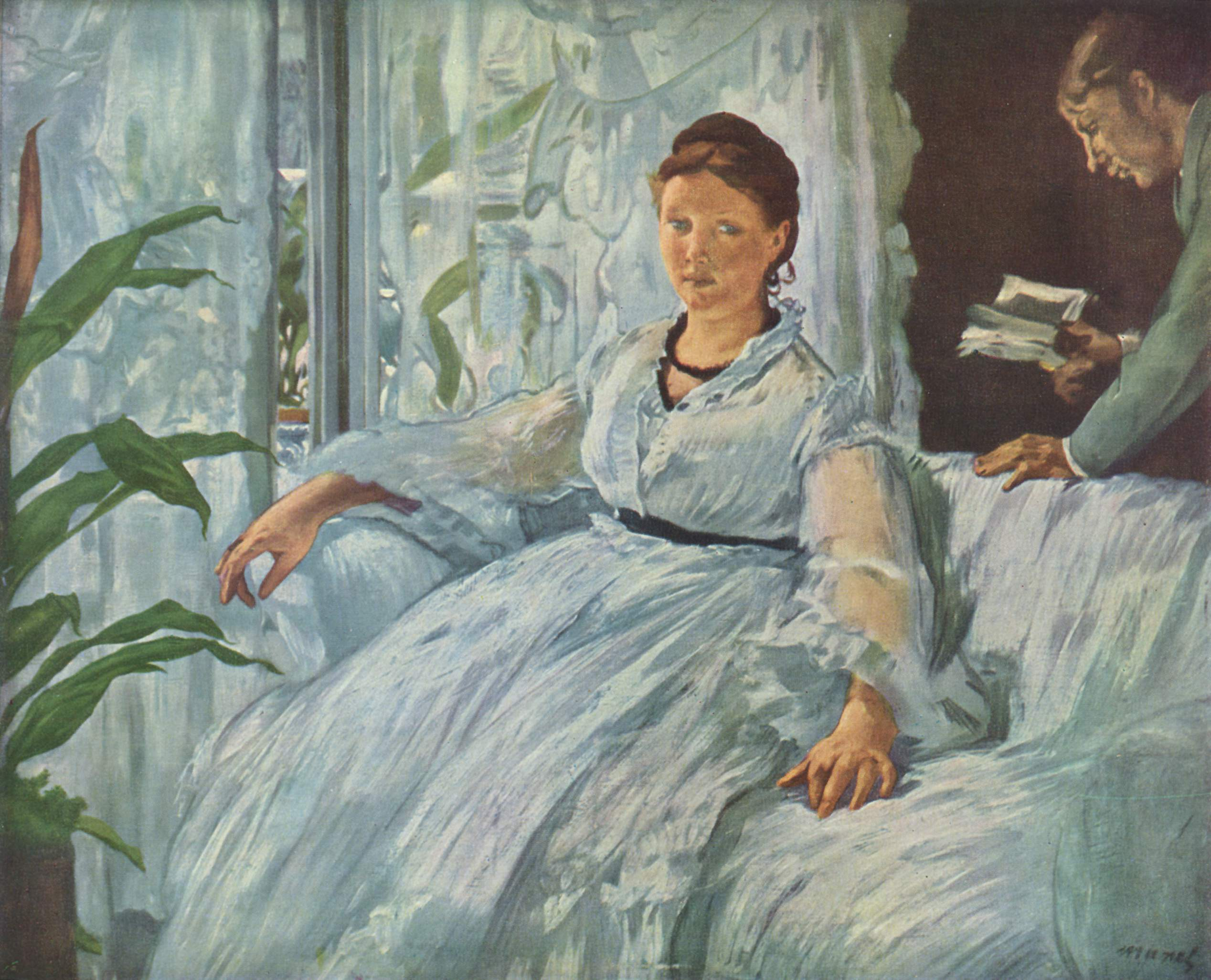
Édouard Manet – The Reading (1868)

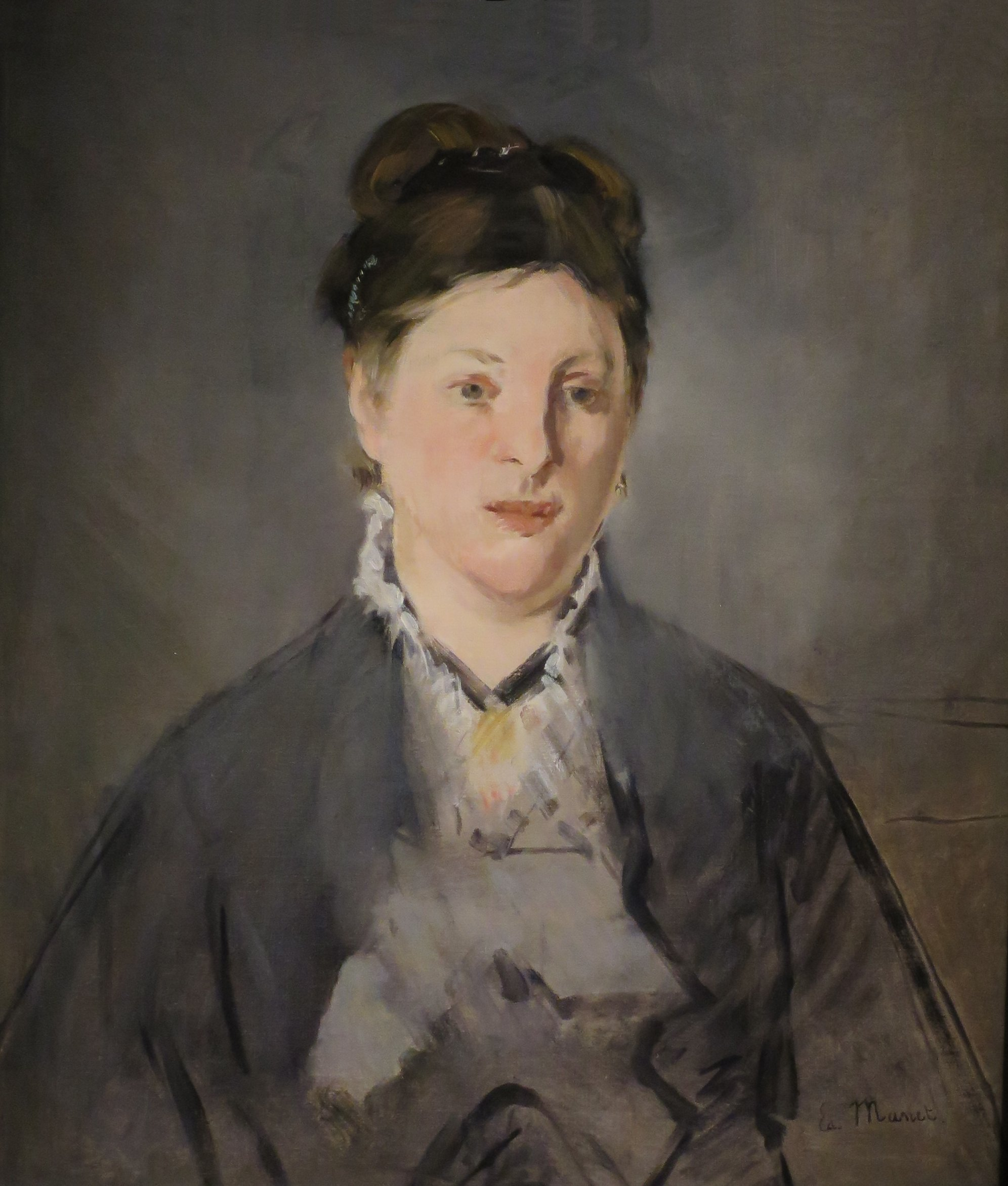
Édouard Manet – Madame Manet (1874-76), Norton Simon Museum

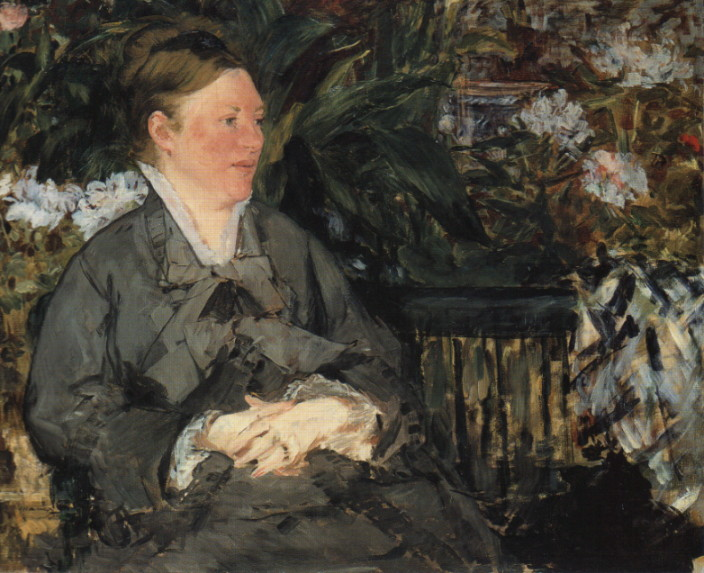
Édouard Manet – Mme. Manet in The Greenhouse (1879)

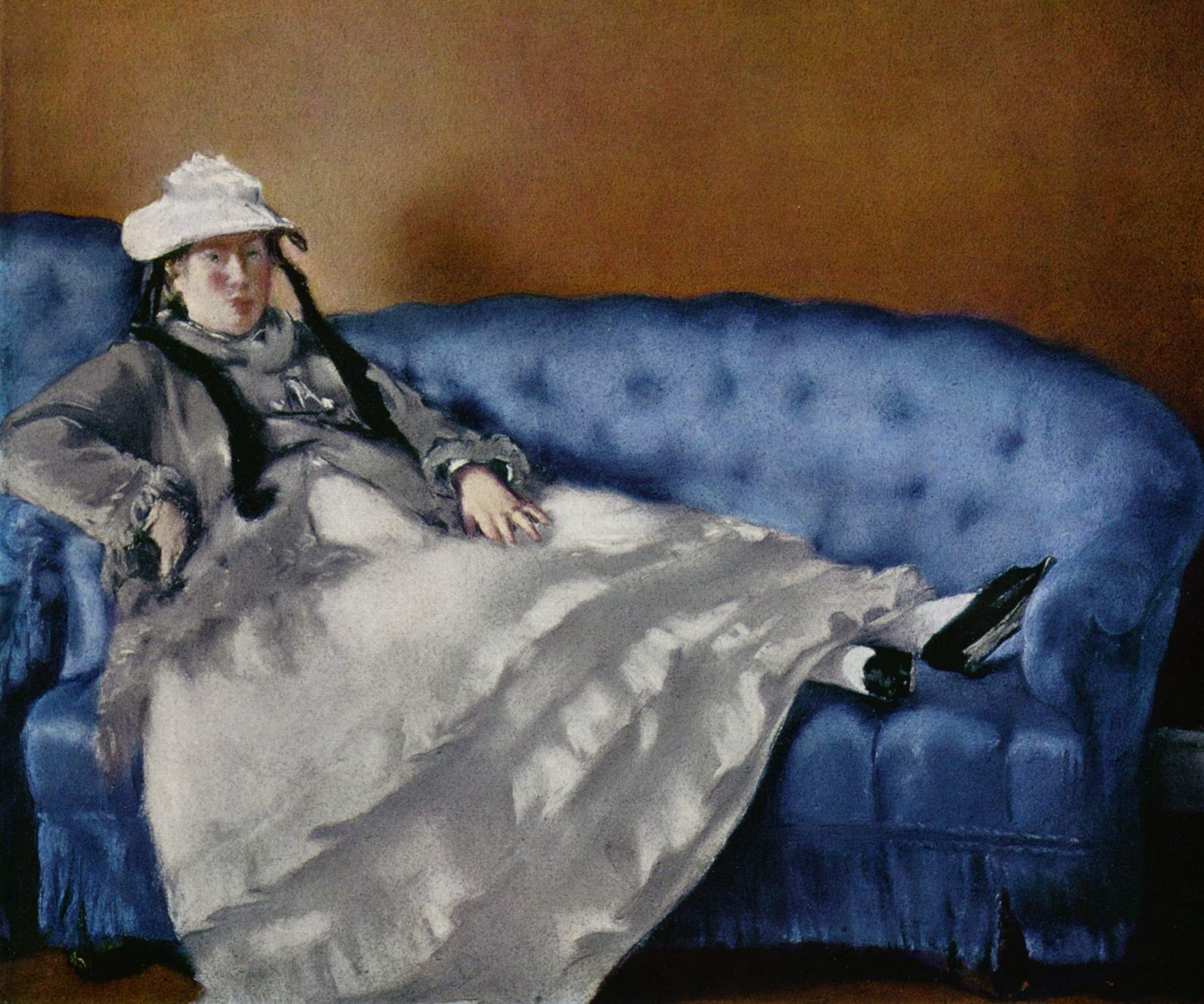
Édouard Manet – Mme. Manet, On A Blue Sofa (c. 1880)

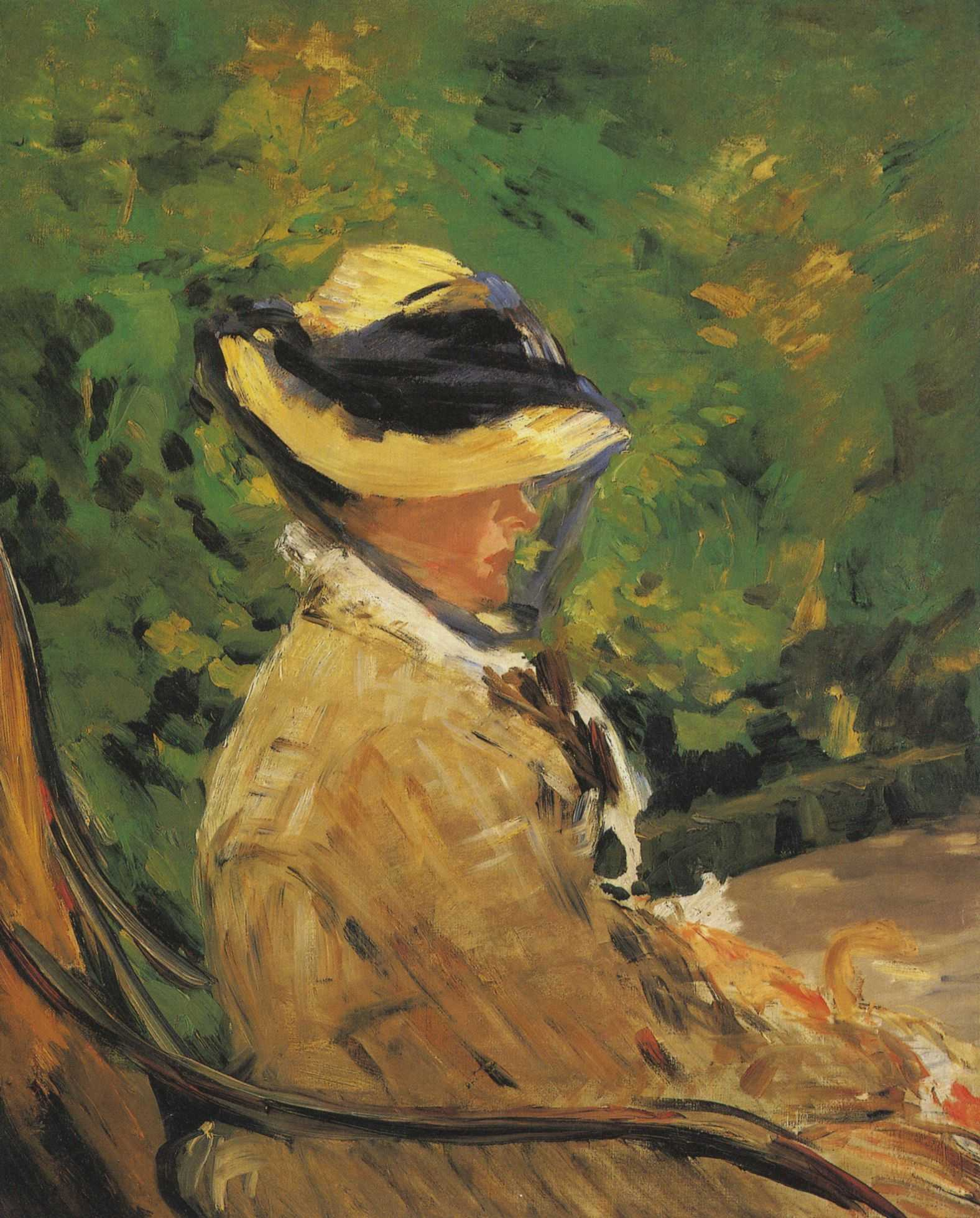
Édouard Manet – Mme Manet in the garden of Bellevue (1880), Metropolitan Museum of Art
