= Boys Drawing =

1864 painting by Sofie Ribbing

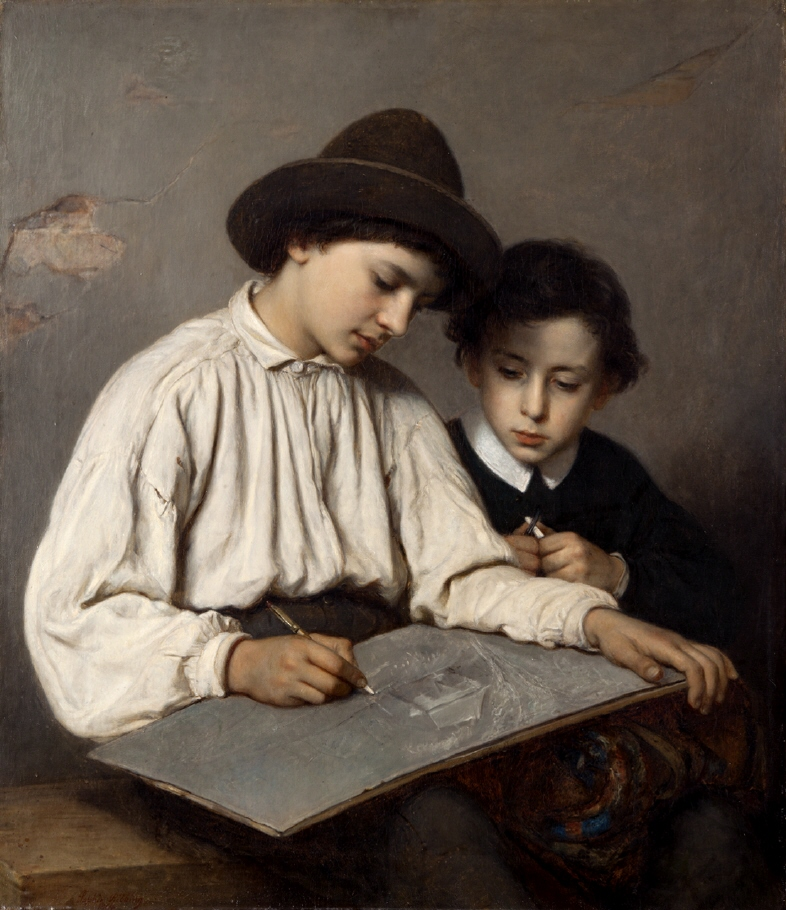
- Artist: Sofie Ribbing
- Year: 1864
- Medium: Oil on canvas
- Dimensions: 91.5 cm × 79 cm (36.0 in × 31 in)
- Location: Gothenburg Museum of Art, Gothenburg

Boys Drawing is an 1864 oil on canvas painting by the Swedish artist Sofie Ribbing in the collection of the Gothenburg Museum of Art.

This painting shows two boys drawing and is representative of an everyday realism with genre motifs. It is considered a highlight of the museum and was purchased soon after it was painted in 1866. It has been considered a central work in the history of Swedish art.
