= Sofie Ribbing =

Swedish artist (1859–1924)

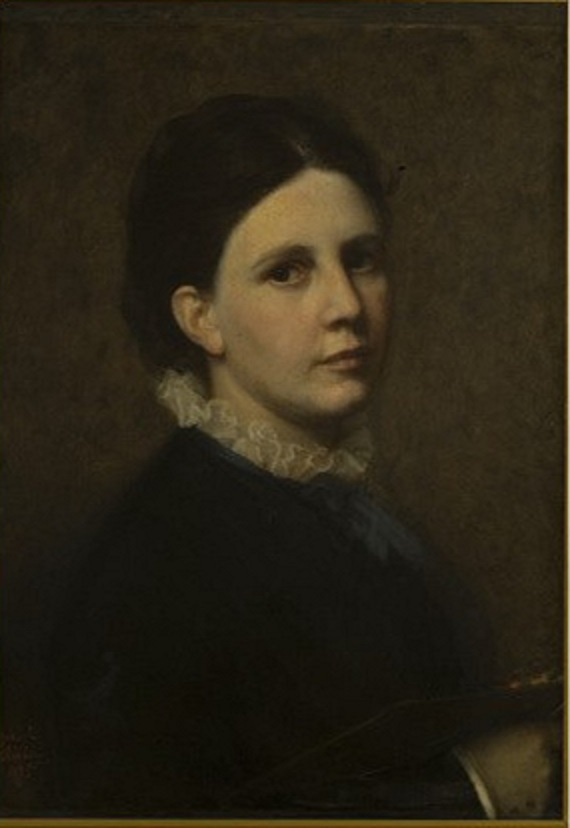
Sofie Amalia Ribbing self-portrait (1880) Uffizi Gallery

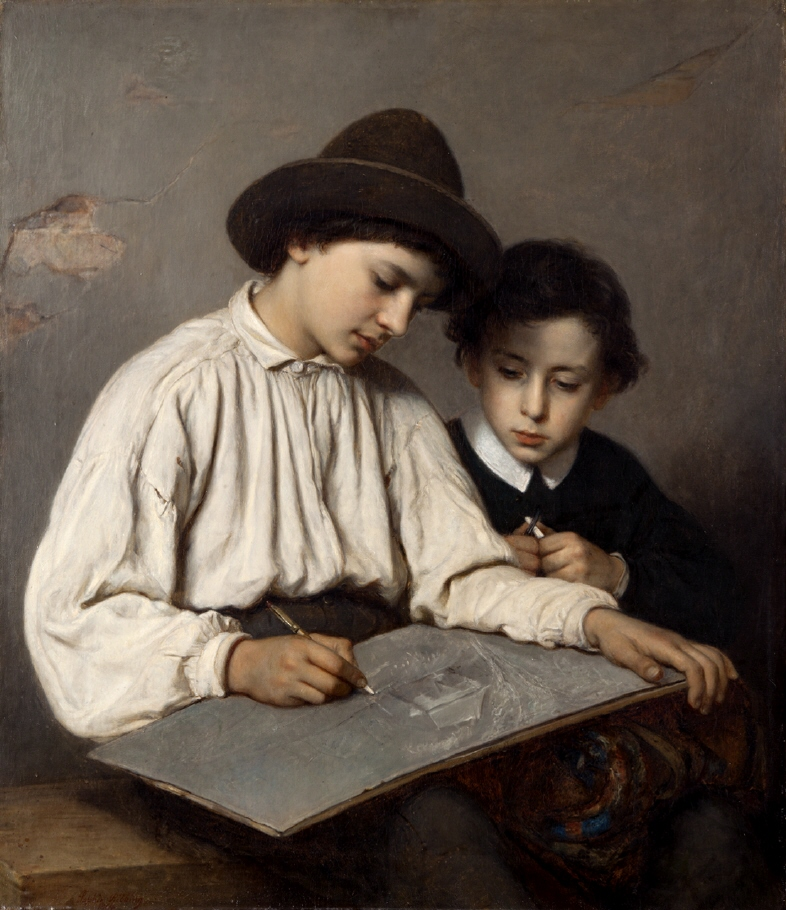
Boys Drawing (1864) Gothenburg Museum of Art

Sofie Amalia Ribbing (6 March 1835 – 7 December 1894) was a Swedish painter of the Düsseldorf School. She specialized in portraits and genre scenes, often placed in family settings.

== Biography ==
She was born at Adelöv in Jönköping County, Sweden. She was the daughter of Per Arvid Ribbing and Carolina Augusta Ehrencrona. Her father was the chairman of the local district court (Häradshövding). When she was only four, her family moved to Hakarp Parish, closer to Jönköping. Beginning in 1850, she studied at the Royal Swedish Academy of Fine Arts, then transferred to the Kunstakademie Düsseldorf, where she studied with Karl Ferdinand Sohn, who would later become the academy's president.

She later went to Paris and found a position in the studios of Jean-Baptiste-Ange Tissier, then continued her studies in Brussels with the painter and engraver Louis Gallait. During the 1860s, she had a studio in Copenhagen. In 1866, under Gallait's sponsorship, she held her first showing at the Brussels Salon. That same year, she had a successful showing at the Industrial Exposition of Stockholm. She later made lengthy visits to London, where she held exhibitions in 1872 and 1888, and The Hague. She also spent time in Rome with her friend, the painter Agnes Börjesson. She never married. She died during 1894 at Christiania (now Oslo) while visiting Norway.

Her works may be seen at the Nationalmuseum, Göteborgs konstmuseum and the National Gallery of Norway. In 2016, the Swedish National Heritage Board chose her painting Boys Drawing (1864) as one of the works that would represent Sweden for "Europeana 280"; a celebration of Europe's shared artistic heritage.
