= Boy Blowing Bubbles =

1867 painting by Édouard Manet

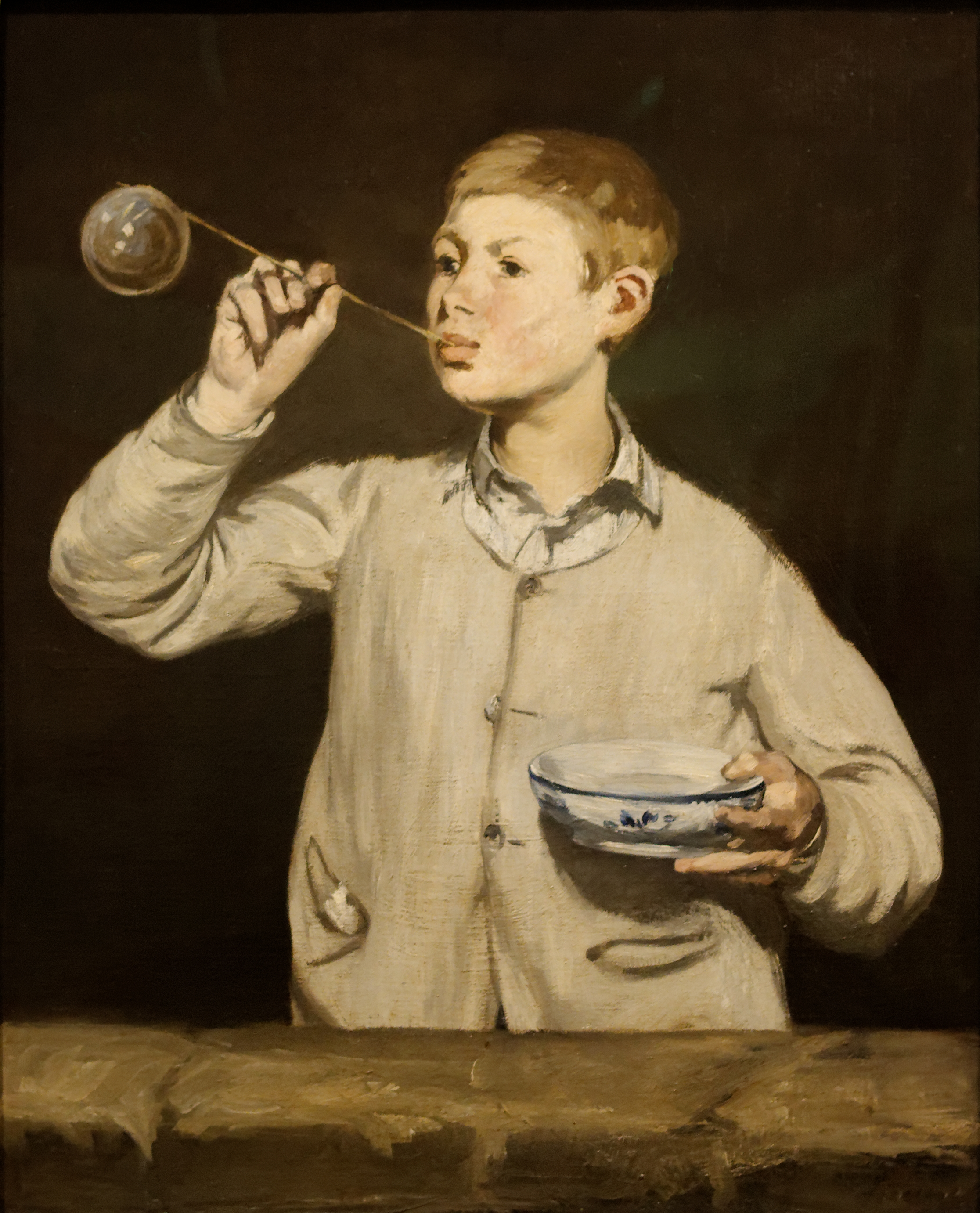
- Artist: Édouard Manet
- Year: 1867
- Medium: Oil on canvas
- Dimensions: 100.5 cm × 81.4 cm (39.6 in × 32.0 in)
- Location: Calouste Gulbenkian Museum, Lisbon

Boy Blowing Bubbles (also known as The Soap Bubbles; French: Les Bulles de savon) is an 1867 oil-on-canvas painting by Édouard Manet, who gave it its present title. It is now in the Calouste Gulbenkian Museum, in Lisbon, whose founder acquired it via André Weil in New York in November 1943.

== Description ==
The painting depicts Léon Koelin-Leenhoff, the out-of-wedlock son (possibly fathered by Manet or by Manet's father) of Manet's future wife, Suzanne Leenhoff. The painting shows him aged 15 blowing soap bubbles, a traditional symbol of the brevity of life.

Manet's teacher Thomas Couture had painted a work with the same subject in 1859 (New York, Metropolitan Museum of Art), but it differs from Manet's naturalistic treatment by the inclusion of numerous narrative and symbolic details, such as school books and a laurel wreath. Manet's painting has more in common with an 18th-century prototype, Soap Bubbles by Chardin (1737; Washington, National Gallery of Art). While Manet's use of a nearly monochrome palette and dark background show the influence of the old masters he admired, the contemporary clothing and roughly impasted surface of Boy Blowing Bubbles are consistent with Manet's Realist determination to paint modern life.

Boy Blowing Bubbles is one of 17 works painted by Manet in the 1860s and 1870s depicting young Léon; among the others are Boy Carrying a Sword and Luncheon in the Studio.

== See also ==
- List of paintings by Édouard Manet
- 1867 in art
