= Susanna and the Elders (Rembrandt) =

Painting by Rembrandt

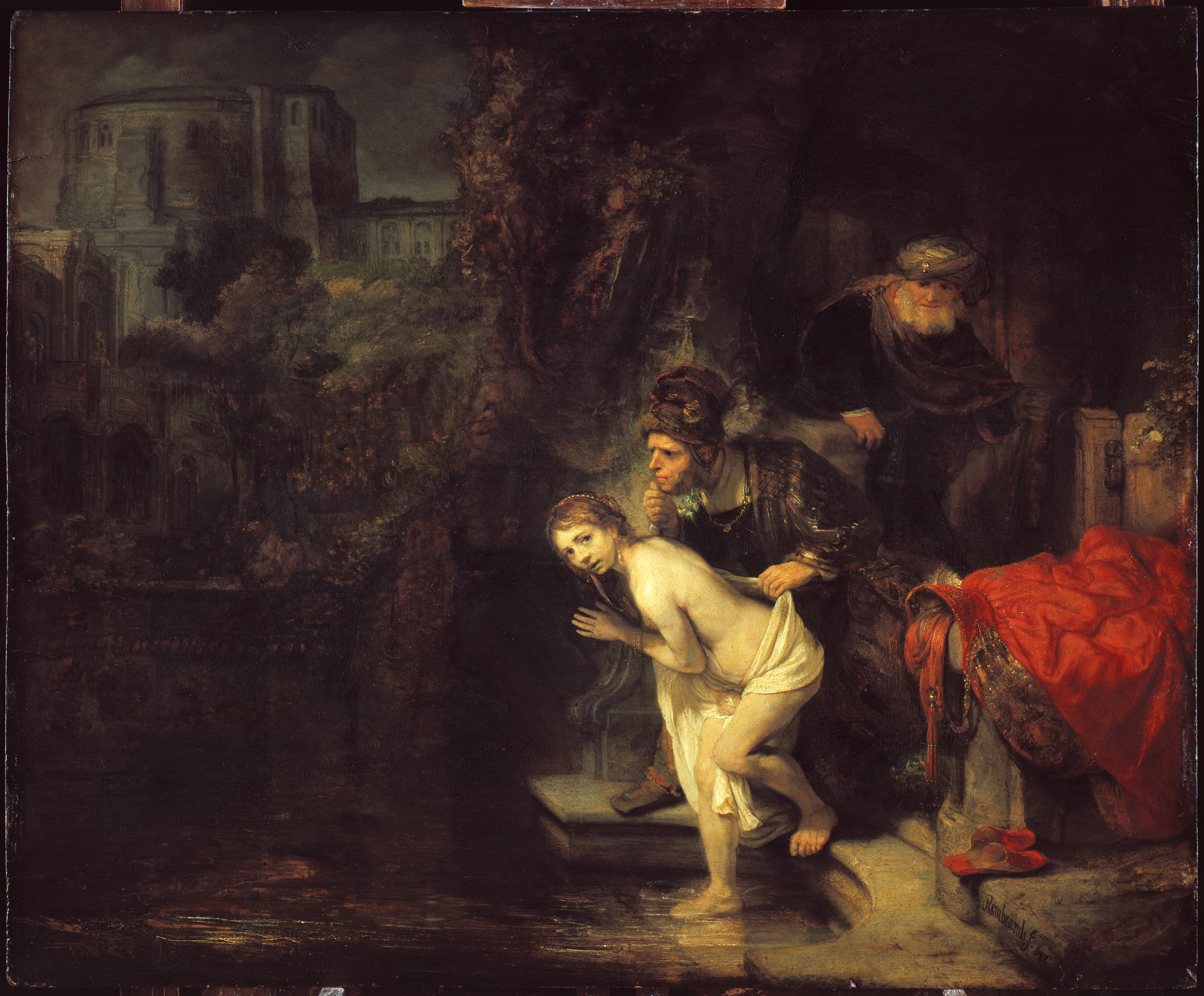
- Artist: Rembrandt
- Year: 1647
- Dimensions: 76.6 cm × 92.8 cm (30.2 in × 36.5 in)
- Location: Gemäldegalerie, Berlin

Susanna and the Elders is a painting by the Dutch artist Rembrandt from the Baroque period. It is an oil painting on a Peltogyne panel completed in the year 1647. It depicts the story of Susanna, a Deuterocanonical text from the book of Daniel in the Bible. The painting is currently housed at the Gemäldegalerie in Berlin.

== History ==
=== Creation ===
When Rembrandt painted Susanna and the Elders, religious themes in art were not as common as in other parts of Europe, most such paintings coming from Rembrandt himself. This was due to the rise of Protestantism in Holland and a loss of favor for the Catholic traditions at the time. However, while Rembrandt studied many modern subjects for his work, he still continued to explore Biblical themes, despite their waning popularity. He initially based Susanna and the Elders on one of the same name by his teacher, Pieter Lastman. Rembrandt copied Lastman's painting in a drawing c. 1636 as a study for his own work. The painting Rembrandt completed in 1647 however is notably different in composition than Lastman's except for some similarities in the background. While in Lastman's Susanna the figures all take more passive roles, Rembrandt's is an active scene, with an elder taking hold of Susanna while she twists her body to get away. Only the palace in the background echoes his mentor's work. Shortly after Rembrandt completed the piece in 1647, it appears he sold it to a collector named Adriaen Banck for the price of 500 Florins.

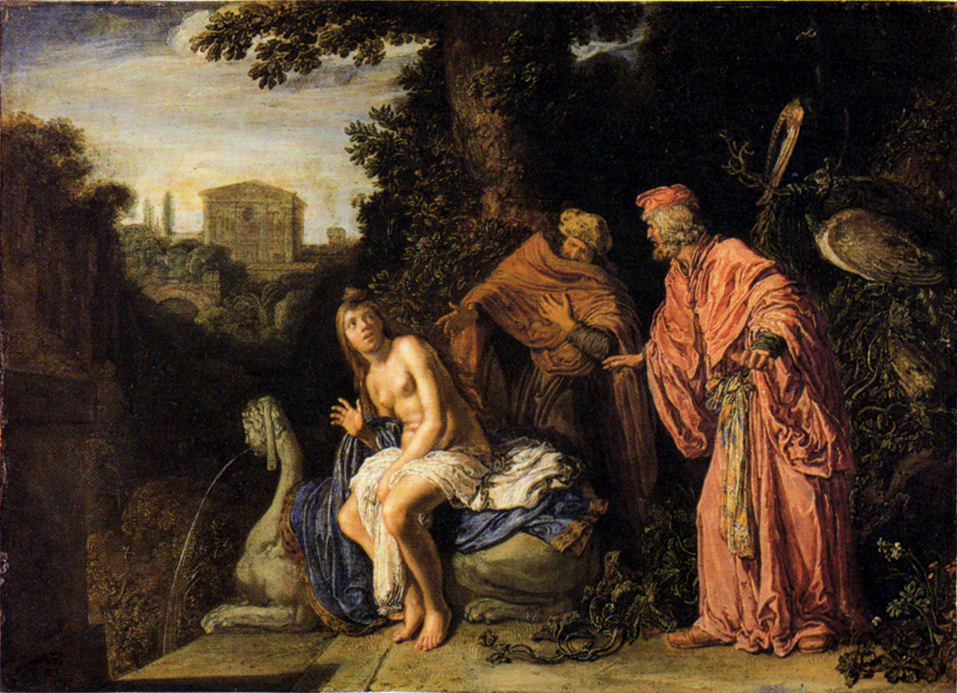
Susanna and the Elders by Pieter Lastman, the inspiration for Rembrandt's version

=== Later modifications ===
In 2015 it was discovered that the painter and collector Sir Joshua Reynolds altered Susanna and the Elders after obtaining it for his collection in the late 18th century. X-ray scans have revealed that large portions of the original work had been painted over, and other parts were removed with solvents. Reynolds made modifications to a good majority of the background, leaving only Rembrandt's figures, the Babylonian palace in the distance, and a few foreground elements untouched. It is unclear exactly why Reynolds made such extensive alterations to the painting, but he was known to modify works in his collection.

=== Ownership ===
- Collection of Adriaen Banck, 1647
- Collection of Adriaen Maen, 1660
- Collection of Baron Schonborn, 1738
- Collection of J. A. J. Aved, 1766
- Collection of Edmund Burke, 1769
- Collection of Sir Joshua Reynolds, 1795
- Purchased by Wilhelm von Bode for the Kaiser-Friedrich Museum in Berlin, 1883

== Content ==
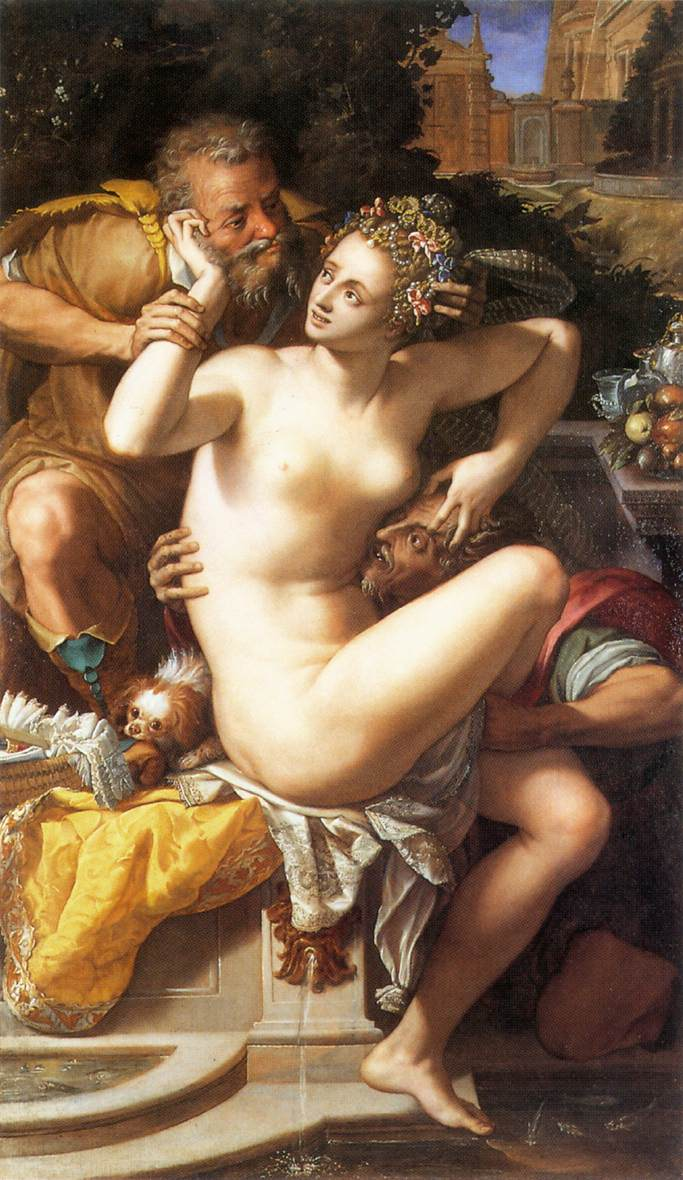
Alessandro Allori, Susanna and The Elders, 1561

The painting depicts the story of Susanna from the Catholic tradition. Susanna and the Elders was a relatively common Biblical scene for artists to depict, and there are examples from many past artists, Pieter Lastman being a notable example. Traditionally this story was interpreted as being about God's faithfulness and justice; when Susanna is wrongfully accused and facing execution, she prays and is saved by the wise plan that Daniel comes up with to test the elders' testimony. Artists painting this scene usually infused it with eroticism, presenting Susanna in a tantalizing manner. Most depictions of this story portray Susanna as a temptress or a Venus like figure. This is particularly visible in Alessandro Allori's version of Susanna, for example, where she almost seems to be cavorting with the men rather than trying to get away. In others, such as Lastman's, the elders' intrusion is seen as more of a minor annoyance, rather than an assault. Rembrandt's piece, however, favors a more grounded telling of the story, without the added allure, focusing on the moral aspect and Susanna as a victim.

== Visual description ==
Rembrandt's Susanna has a major difference from previous versions. Whereas earlier Susanna paintings had a sensual, erotic quality to them, Rembrandt showed it more as an attempted assault as described in the story. Susanna attempts to pull away from the elder that has taken hold of her garment. She makes eye contact with the viewer, perhaps appealing for help. It has also been suggested that the viewer becomes a participant in a way, instead of a hidden voyeur as with other versions. Her expression appears distressed, unlike earlier versions of the painting where she would look bemused or even lustful. With this, it becomes less of an erotic piece for the patron and more about the story itself. The painting has rich colors and the intense shadow and light that Rembrandt is known for. Susanna is in the process of disrobing and stepping into the pool for a bath when she is interrupted by the two elders. She looks distressed as the younger of the two grabs hold of her robe and leers down at her. Many features of the painting have an Orientalist feel to them. Examples can be seen in the surroundings, which are lush, with very dense tropical foliage surrounding the pool and lining the far bank of the river. The garb worn by the elders is another example, particularly the turbans they wear. Additionally, a Babylonian palace is visible in the background. These "Eastern" features were known to Dutch artists by way of books of illustrations from traders that had been to Asia and recorded what they saw. These features are a type of fantasy, based on written information, sketches, and other secondhand accounts.

Various studies by Rembrandt for Susanna and the Elders

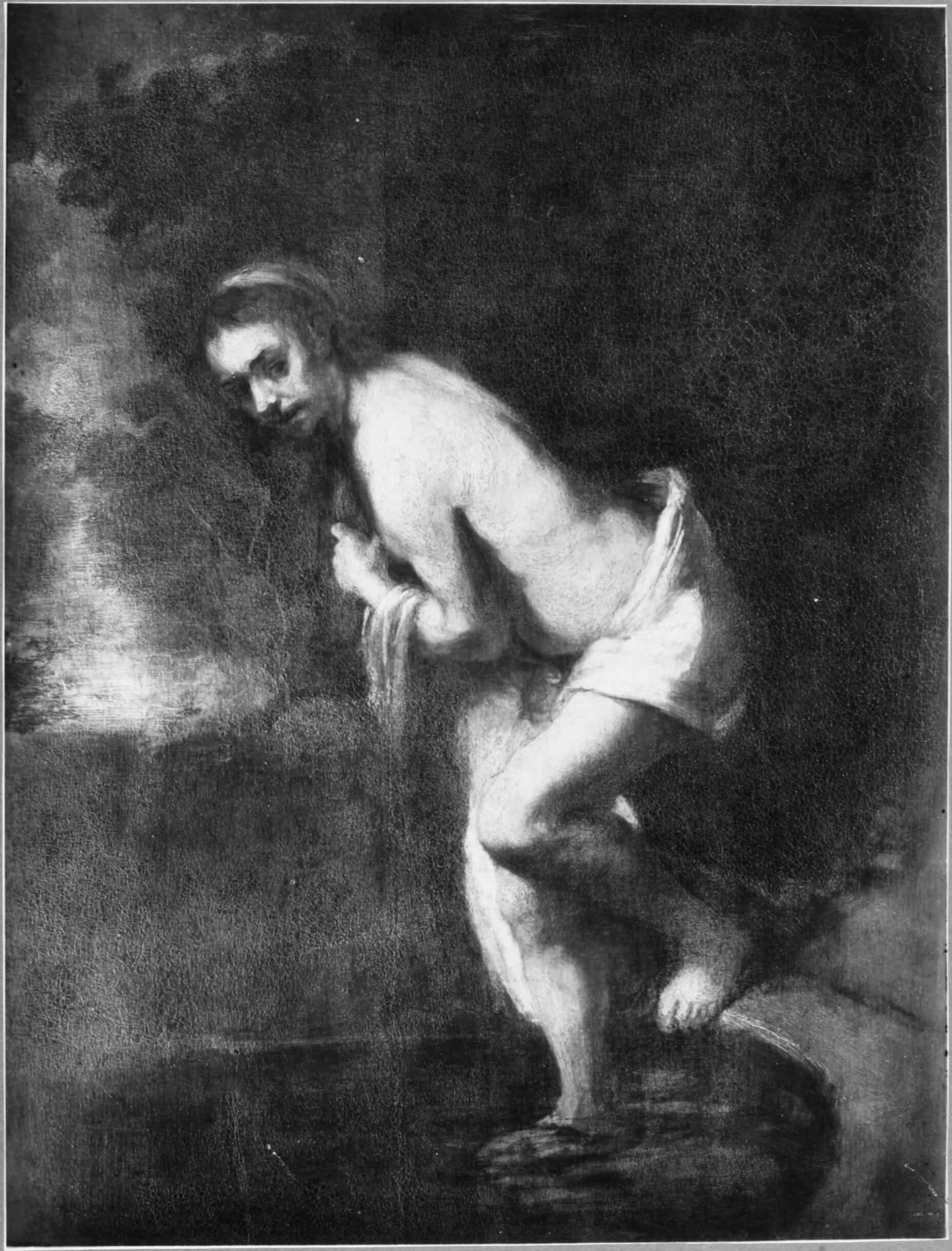
Louvre (HdG 58)

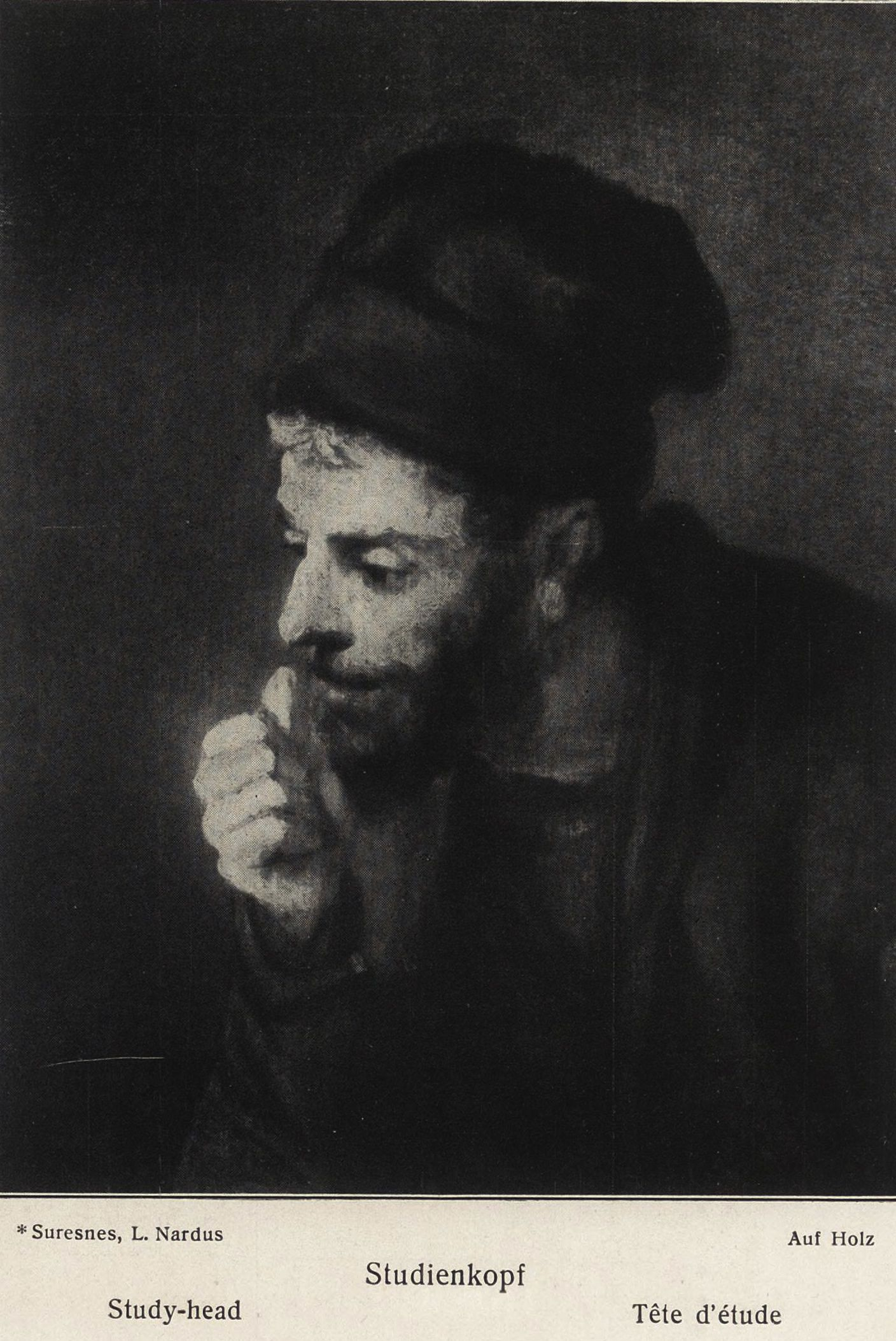
Private collection (HdG 59)

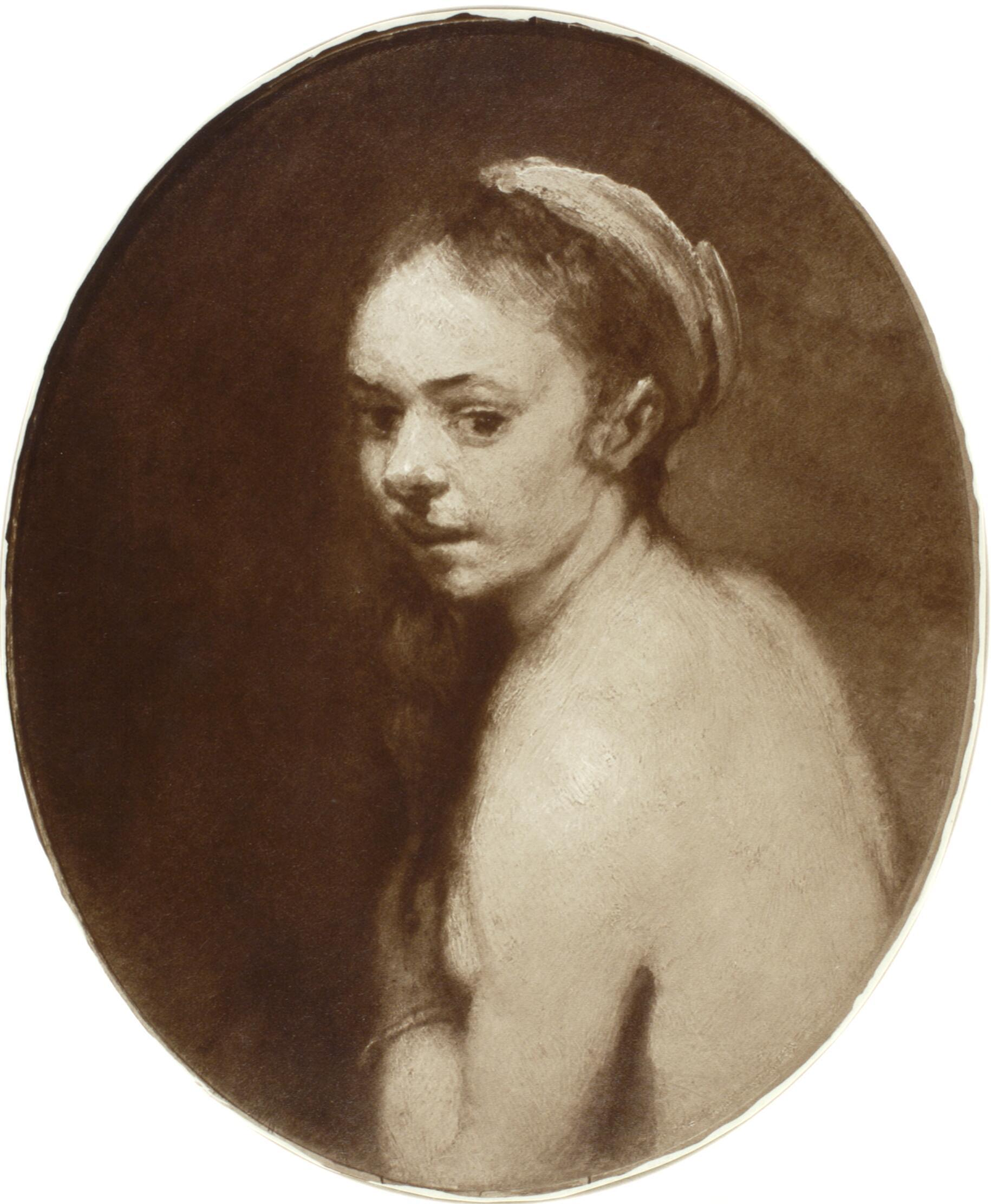
musée Bonnat (HdG 60)

== See also ==
- List of paintings by Rembrandt
