= Stack Rock, County Antrim =

Painting by Clarkson Stanfield

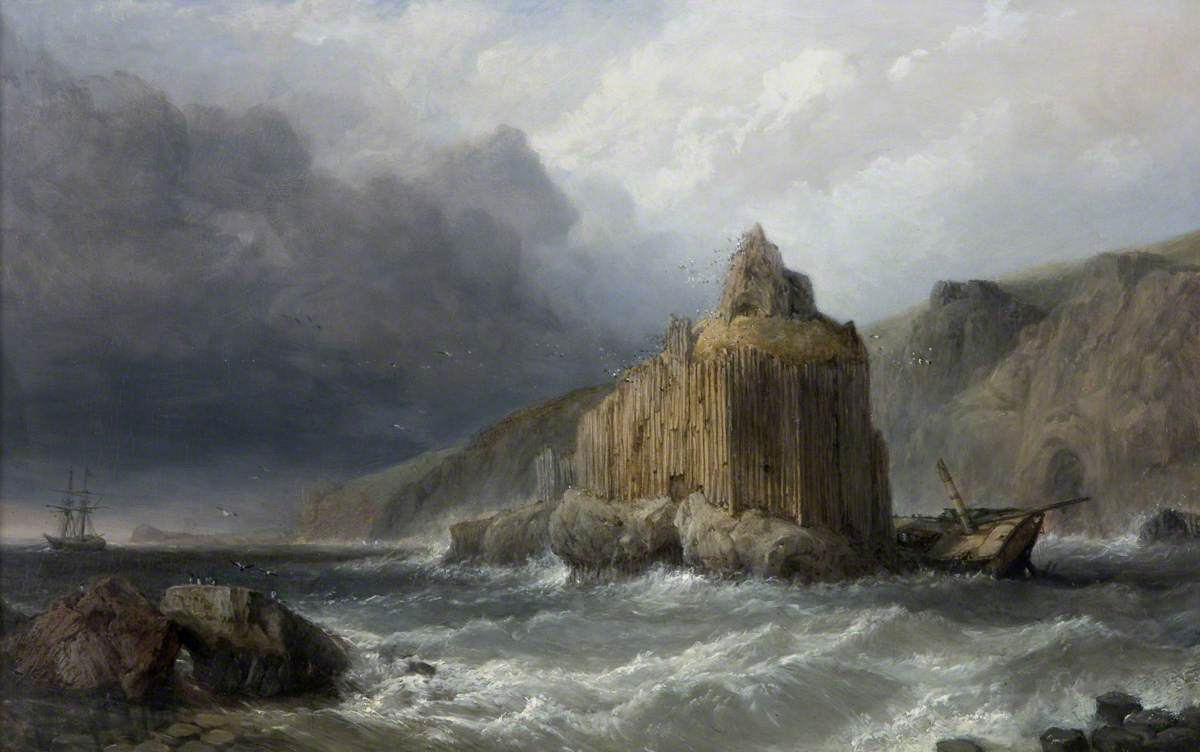
- Artist: Clarkson Stanfield
- Year: 1861
- Type: Oil on canvas, landscape painting
- Dimensions: 38 cm × 61.2 cm (15 in × 24.1 in)
- Location: Ulster Museum, Belfast

Stack Rock, County Antrim is an 1861 oil painting by the British artist Clarkson Stanfield. It depicts a sea stack on the coast of County Antrim in Ulster.

Stanfield was a former sailor who had spent time as a set designer in the London theatres before becoming a celebrated marine painter and rival of J.M.W. Turner. Stanfield, a Catholic and son of an Irishman, visited Ireland in 1855. Like much of his work it is romantic in style.

The painting was displayed at the Royal Academy Exhibition of 1862 held at the National Gallery In London. It is now in the collection of the Ulster Museum in Belfast, having been acquired in 1964.

== Bibliography ==
- Van der Merwe, Pieter & Took, Roger. The Spectacular career of Clarkson Stanfield. Tyne and Wear County Council Museums, 1979.
- Wright, Christopher, Gordon, Catherine May & Smith, Mary Peskett. British and Irish Paintings in Public Collections: An Index of British and Irish Oil Paintings by Artists Born Before 1870 in Public and Institutional Collections in the United Kingdom and Ireland. Yale University Press, 2006.
