= Lincoln Vicksburg Monument =

Memorial in Columbus, Ohio, U.S.

- United States
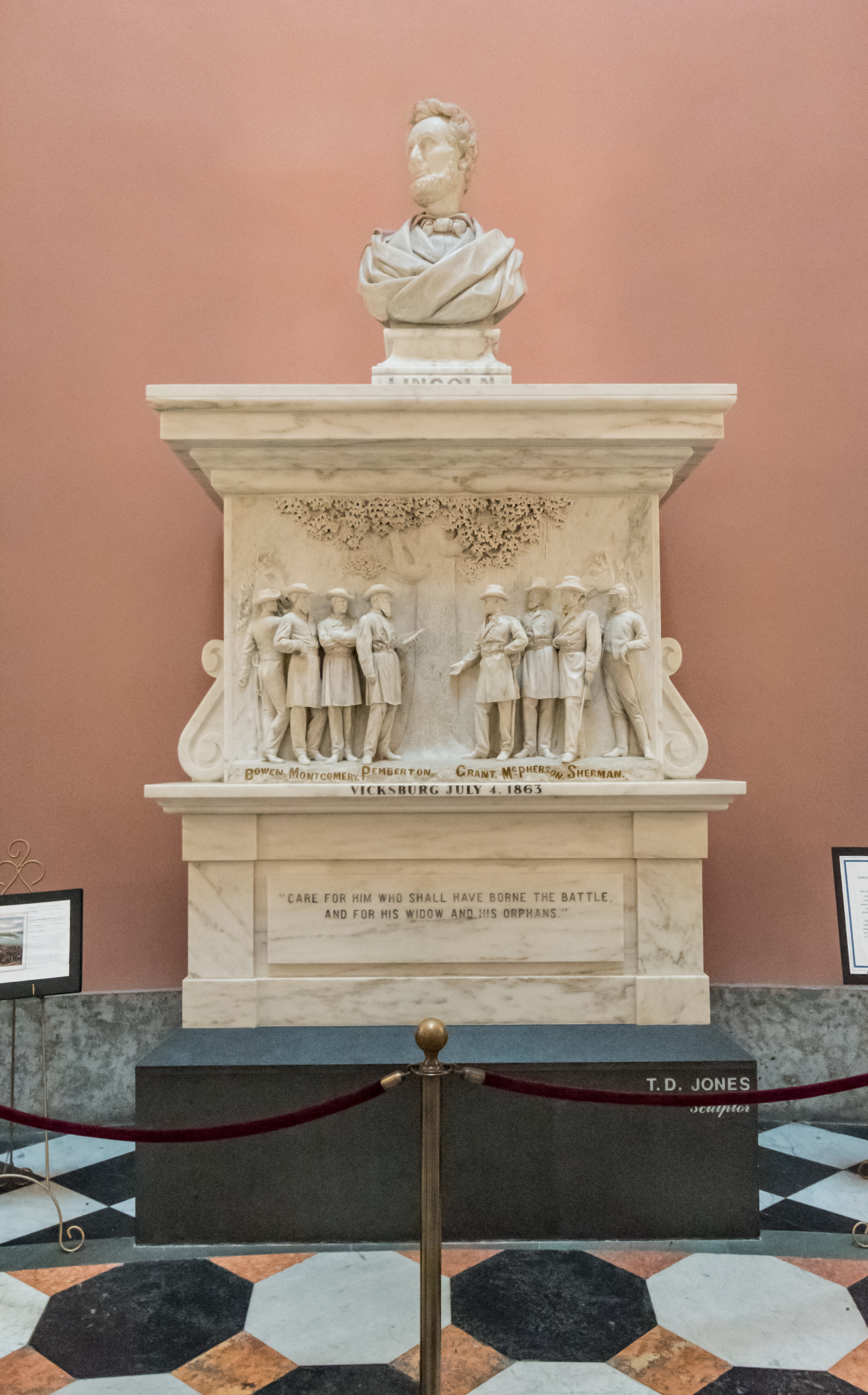
- For Abraham Lincoln and victims of the American Civil War
- Location: Ohio Statehouse, Columbus, Ohio, U.S.
- Designed by: Thomas Dow Jones

The Lincoln Vicksburg Monument, also known as the Lincoln and Soldiers' Monument, is a marble memorial commemorating Abraham Lincoln and victims of the American Civil War by Thomas Dow Jones, installed in the Ohio Statehouse's rotunda, in Columbus, Ohio, United States.

Created from 1865 to 1871, the monument is the oldest known work of public art in Columbus.

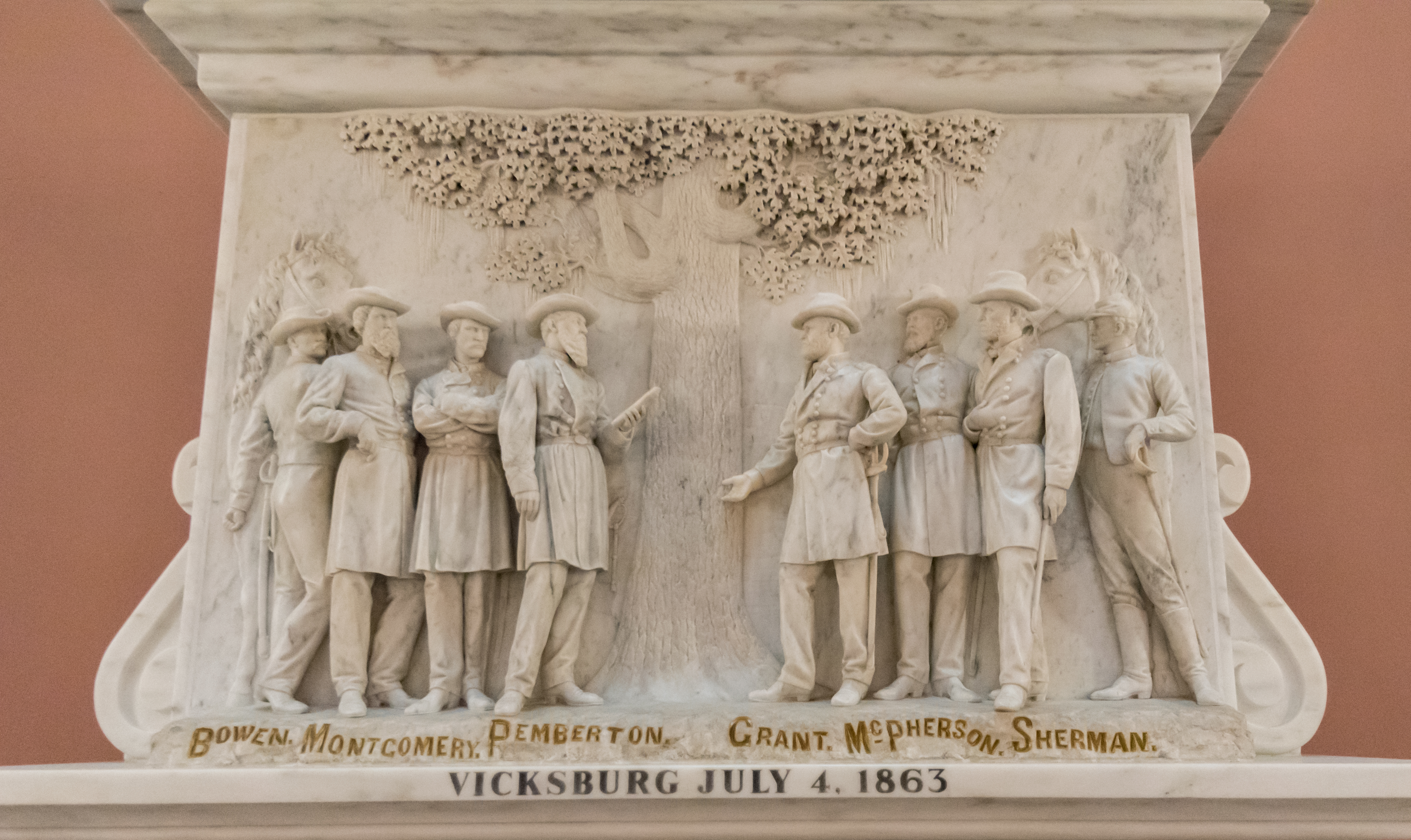
Sculptural detail
