= Marie Aarestrup =

Norwegian artist (1826–1919)

Marie Helene Aarestrup (1826–1919) was a Norwegian artist who specialized in genre and portrait painting. A fine example of her work is a portrait of the Swedish singer Kristina Nilsson which she exhibited in 1865 at the Paris Salon. In later life she painted animals, especially horses.

== Biography ==
Born in Flekkefjord in south-western Norway on 27 May 1826, Marie Aarestrup was the daughter of the jurist Peter Nicolai Aarestrup and Sara Haasted. After studying drawing at Hans Reusch's school in Bergen, she continued her training in Copenhagen (1843–44). From 1859 to 1863, she studied under Jean-Baptiste-Ange Tissier in Paris, after which she spent six months in Düsseldorf as a student of Benjamin Vautier. In later life, she was mainly in England and Poland before finally settling in Paris in the 1890s.

After a rough period in Bergen in the mid-1860s when she had trouble making ends meet, she spent the rest of her life abroad, working both as a teacher and a painter. From the 1870s, when she was in Poland, she became interested in painting animals, especially horses.

Marie Aarestrup died in Paris on 9 June 1919.
