= Napoleon III Freeing Abd el Kader =

Painting by Jean-Baptiste-Ange Tissier

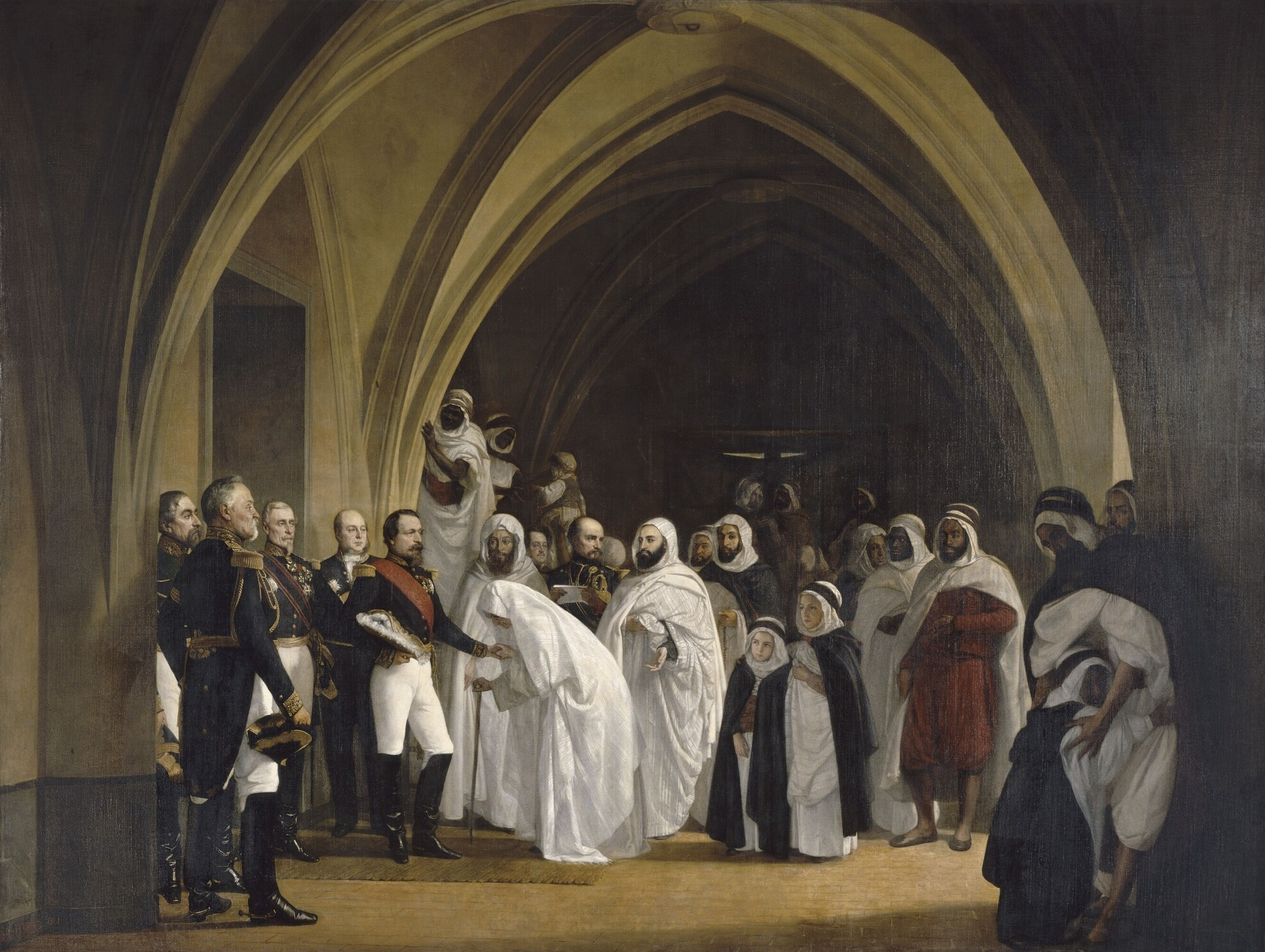
- Artist: Jean-Baptiste-Ange Tissier
- Year: 1861
- Type: Oil on canvas, history painting
- Dimensions: 350 cm × 465 cm (140 in × 183 in)
- Location: Palace of Versailles, Versailles

Napoleon III Freeing Abd el Kader, also referred to as The Submission of Abd el Kader, is an 1861 history painting by the French artist Jean-Baptiste-Ange Tissier. It depicts the scene on 16 October 1852 at the Château d'Amboise when Napoleon III visited the Algerian leader Emir Abdelkader to inform him he had been granted his freedom. He had led a lengthy resistance to the French Conquest of Algeria before surrendering in 1847. He later became celebrated for his intervention to avert a Massacre of Christians in Damascus in 1860. In the picture the Emir's elderly mother is leaning over to kiss the hand of her son's benefactor, who is accompanied by senior figures including Marshal Saint-Arnaud.

At the time Napoleon was President of the Second Republic, but the following month he became Emperor. He continued the policy of the earlier July Monarchy of commissioning large scenes depicting moments from his reign to serve as popular propaganda. The painting was displayed at the Salon of 1861 held in Paris. Today it forms part of the collection of the Museum of French History at the Palace of Versailles.

== Bibliography ==
- Boime, Albert. Art in an Age of Civil Struggle, 1848-1871. University of Chicago Press, 2008.
- Vidal-Bué, Marion. L'Algérie des peintres: 1830-1960. Paris-Méditerranée, 2002.
