= Thomas Dow Jones =

American sculptor (1811-1881)

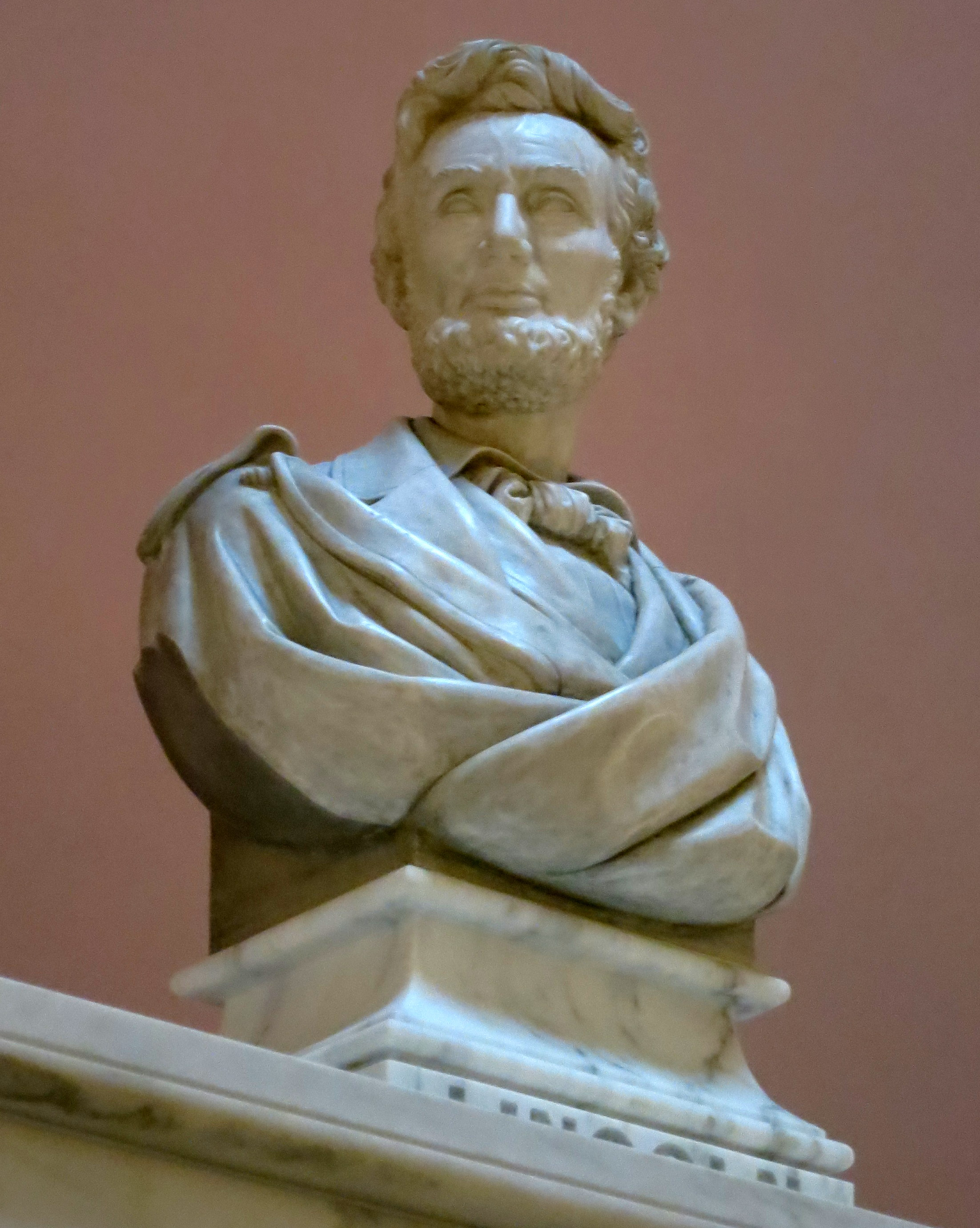
This bust of Abraham Lincoln by Thomas D. Jones is part of the Lincoln Vicksburg Monument in the rotunda of the Ohio Statehouse.

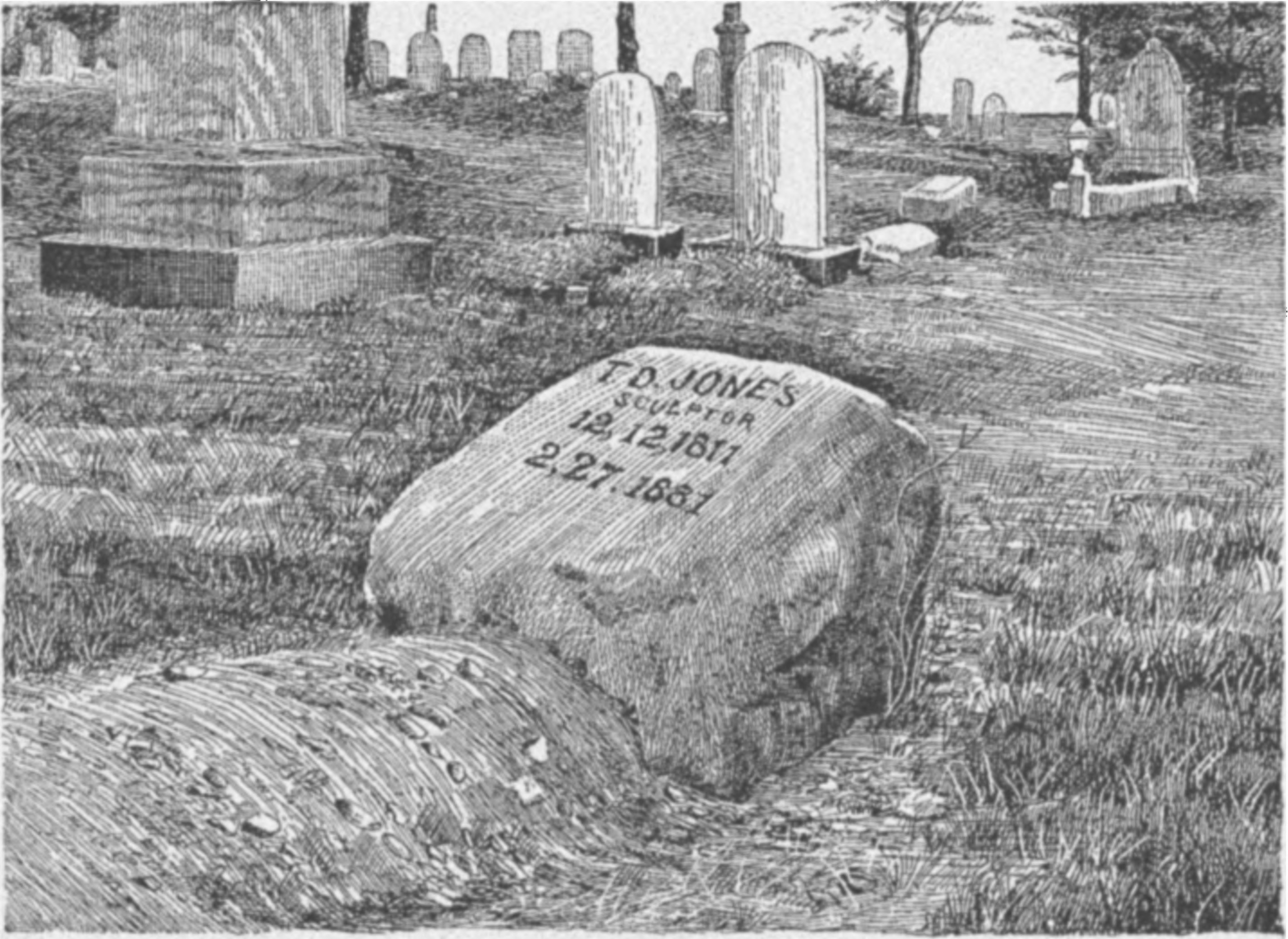
Welsh Hills

Thomas D. Jones (December 11, 1811 – February 27, 1881) was an American sculptor and medallist. Moses Jacob Ezekiel was his student.

Thomas D. Jones was born in the United States of America on December 11, 1811, in Oneida County, New York.

He moved to Ohio in the 1830s, where he worked in Cincinnati as a stonemason, and by 1842 was sculpting portrait busts. In 1851 he moved to New York City, and in 1853 was elected an Associate Member of the National Academy of Design.

Jones's best-known works include a bust of Abraham Lincoln commissioned by the leading Republicans of Cincinnati (1861), medallions of Henry Clay and Daniel Webster, and a marble bust of Chief Justice Salmon P. Chase now in the Supreme Court Building. He also produced bas‑relief medallion portraits which were usually cast in plaster. Jones is buried in Welsh Hills Cemetery, Granville, Ohio.

Jones died on 27 February 1881.
