= Boy Carrying a Sword =

Painting by Édouard Manet

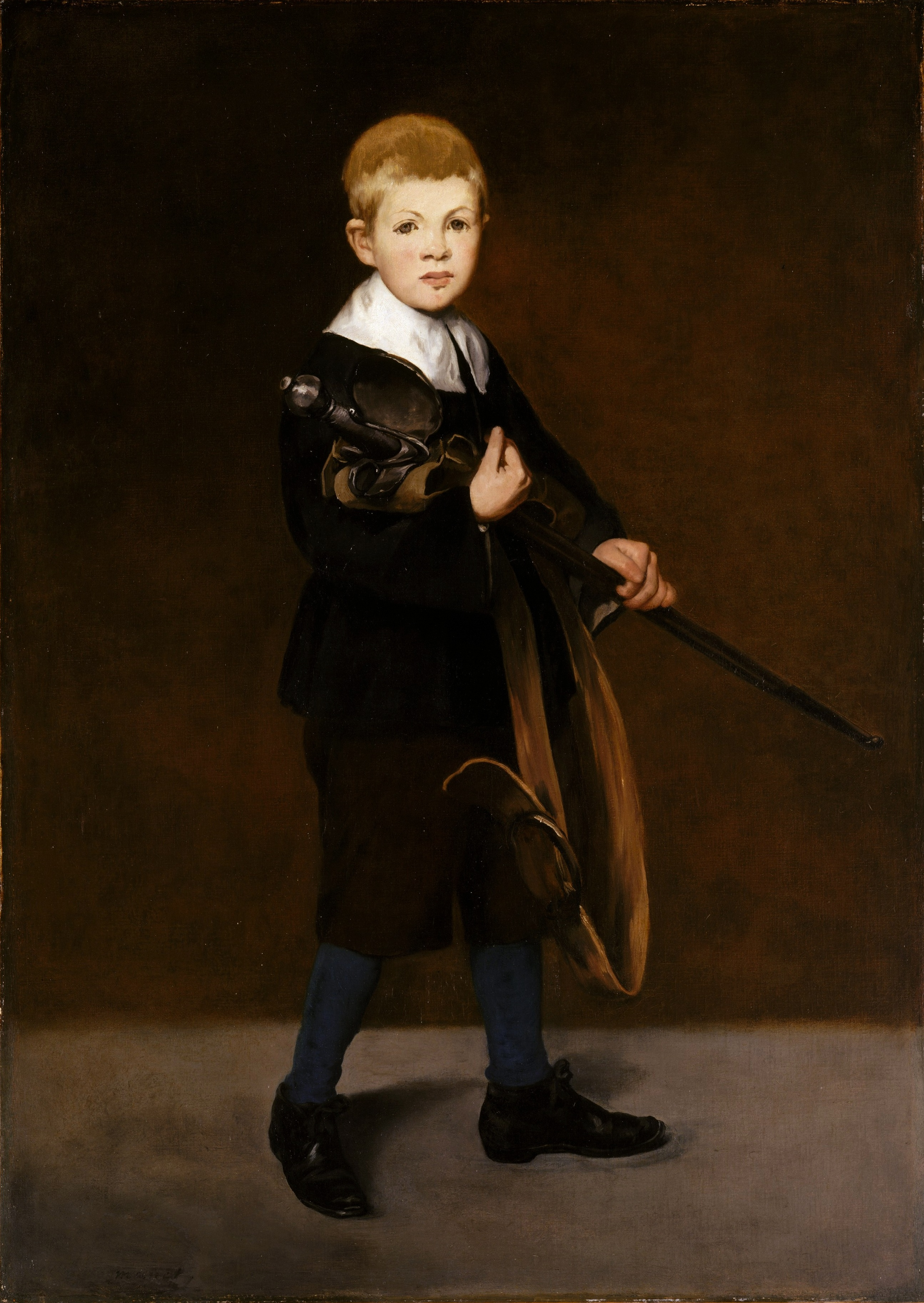
- Artist: Édouard Manet
- Year: 1861
- Medium: Oil on canvas
- Dimensions: 131.1 cm × 93.3 cm (51.6 in × 36.7 in)
- Location: Metropolitan Museum of Art; New York

Boy Carrying a Sword is an 1861 oil painting by the French artist Édouard Manet and is now displayed at the Metropolitan Museum of Art in New York. The work depicts a small boy costumed as a page of the Spanish court of the seventeenth century; he is holding a full-sized sword and sword belt. The work was later reproduced as an etching under the direction of Dijon painter and etcher Alphonse Legros who collaborated in the work.

According to Émile Zola, the work is typical of the influence of Spanish painters and shows the strong influence Diego Velázquez and Frans Hals had on Manet at the time.

The artist's model was Leon Leenhoff, the stepson of the artist after his marriage to Suzanne in 1862. Some report that Leon might have been Manet's actual son with Suzanne. Some other report that the father could have been Manet's own father, Auguste.

== See also ==
- List of paintings by Édouard Manet
- 1861 in art
