= Jean-Baptiste-Ange Tissier =

French painter

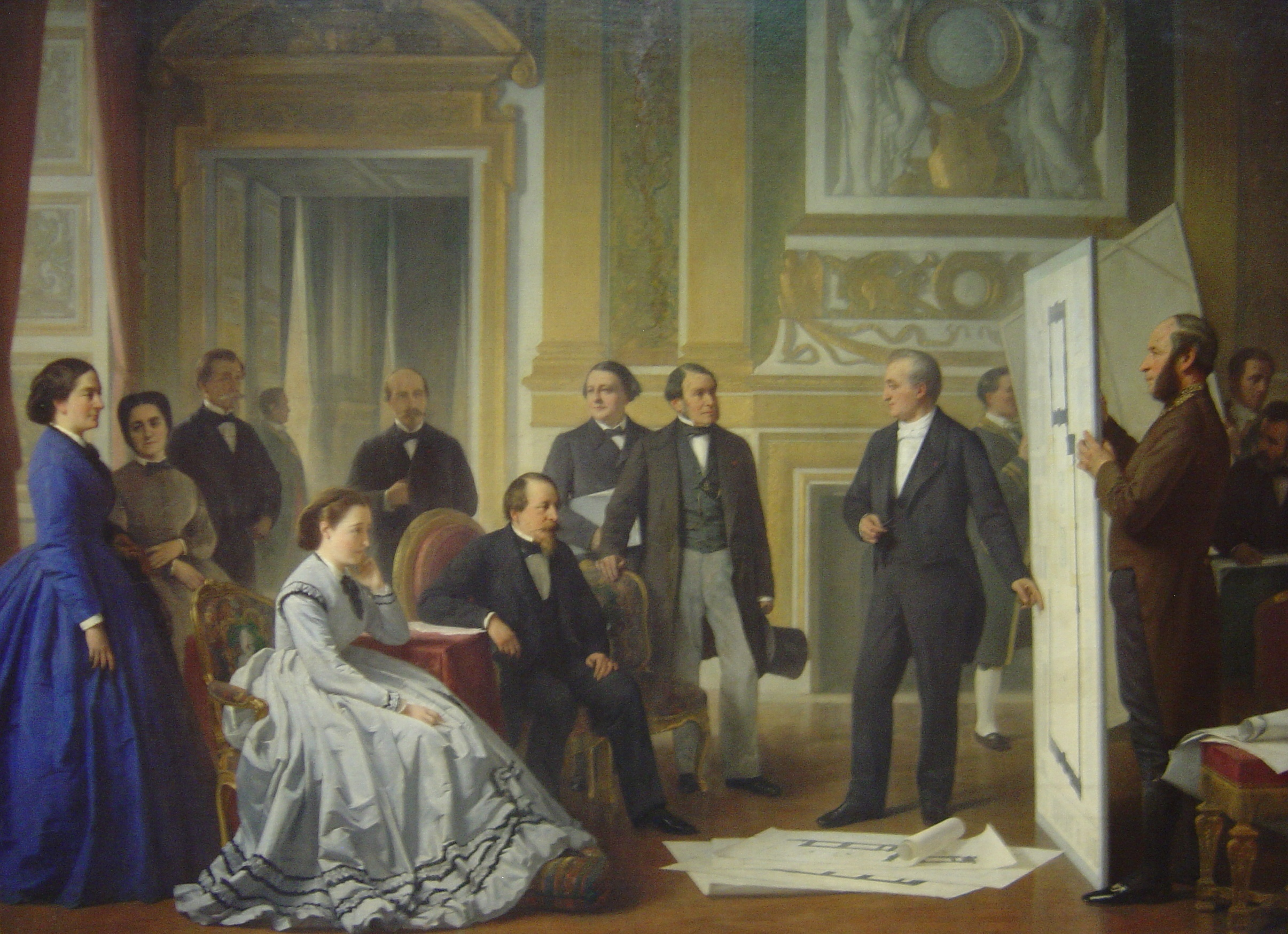
Napoleon III and Louis Visconti

Jean-Baptiste-Ange Tissier (6 March 1814 – 4 April 1876) was a French painter in the Romantic style. He was primarily a portraitist and was an official artist of the Second Empire.

== Biography ==
He was born in Paris. His parents were originally from Soissons, and he began his education there, then continued at the Minor Seminary in Laon. In 1835, he worked in the studios of Ary Scheffer and Paul Delaroche while taking classes at the École des Beaux-arts.

He exhibited several portraits at the Salon of 1838 and continued to have showings there on a regular basis throughout his life. Many of his works were purchased by the government. They received awards in 1845 (Third Class Medal), 1847 and 1848 (Second Class Medal), 1855 (Third Class) and 1861 (Second Class). In 1852, along with Charles Landelle and Jean Gigoux, he decorated the waiting rooms for the "Court of Auditors" and the "Council of State" at Orsay Palace (now the Musée d'Orsay).

In 1861, in addition to the portraits, he presented one of his best known works; a depiction of Napoleon III greeting Emir Abdelkader at the Château d'Amboise (now displayed at Versailles). In 1866, he once again presented a scene with Napoleon III, this time approving plans for the Louvre submitted by Louis Visconti (also now at Versailles). In 1867, he was decorated with the Legion of Honor.

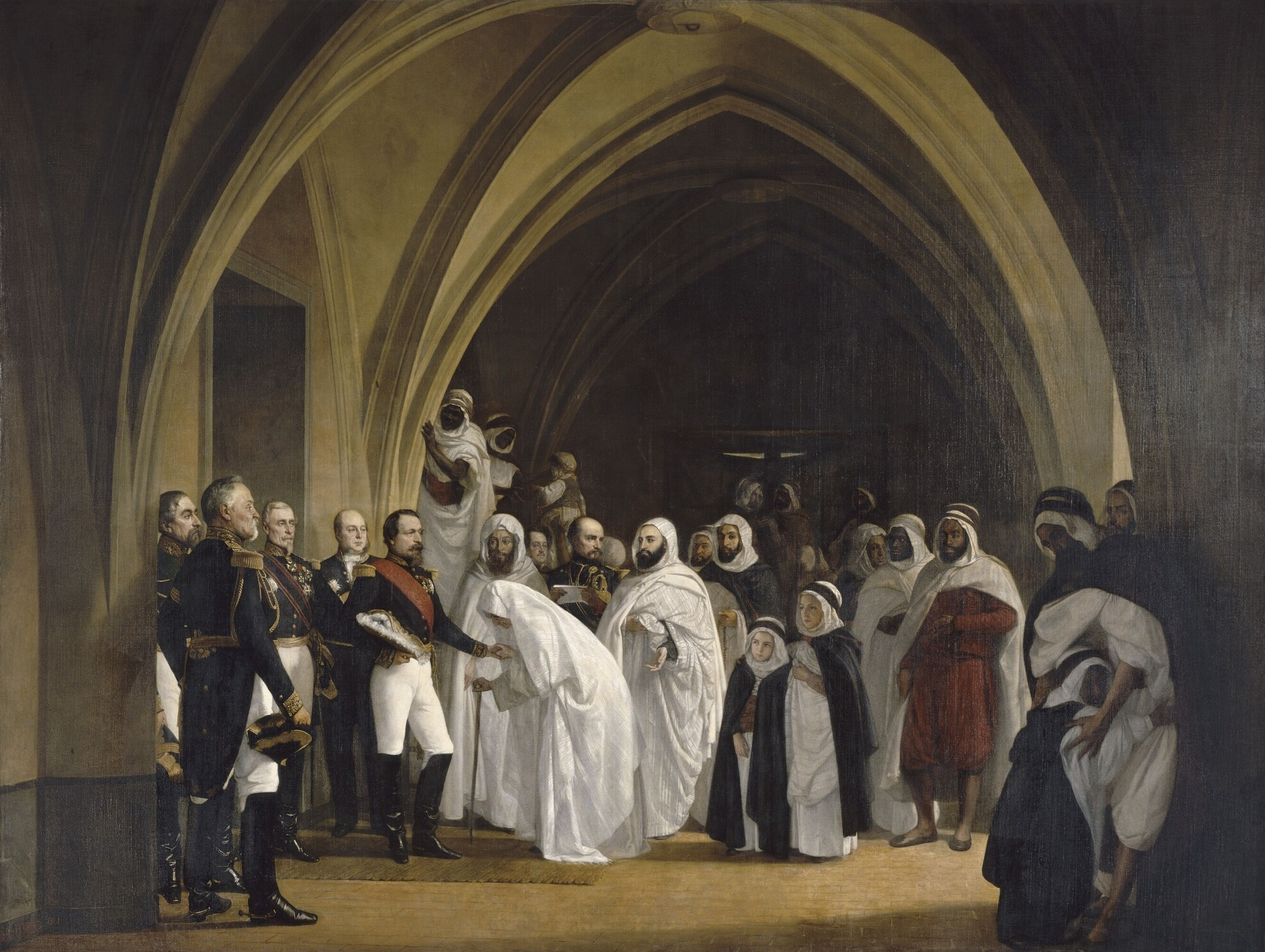
Napoleon III Freeing Abd el Kader, 1861

He also served as an art teacher. Under the Second Empire, most of his students were women, notably the Scandinavians Amalia Lindegren, Kerstin von Post and Marie Aarestrup; the American Elizabeth Jane Gardner and the Peruvian Rebeca Oquendo. Inexplicably, none of his French students, male or female, are now remembered.

Tissier died in 1876 in Nice.
