= 1862 in art =

Events from the year 1862 in art.

== Events ==
- May 1–November 1 – 1862 International Exhibition held at South Kensington in London. Notable artistic displays include a large picture gallery; work shown by William Morris's decorative arts firm of Morris, Marshall, Faulkner & Company; and an exhibit from Japan influential in the development of Anglo-Japanese style. Morris designs his first wallpaper, Trellis.
- May 5 – The Royal Academy Exhibition of 1862 opens at the National Gallery in London
- November 3 – First appearance in print of the term Macchiaioli for the group of revolutionary young Italian painters, in a hostile review published in the journal Gazzetta del Popolo.
- Claude Monet becomes a student of Charles Gleyre in Paris, where he meets Pierre-Auguste Renoir, Frédéric Bazille and Alfred Sisley, sharing new approaches to painting en plein air.

== Works ==
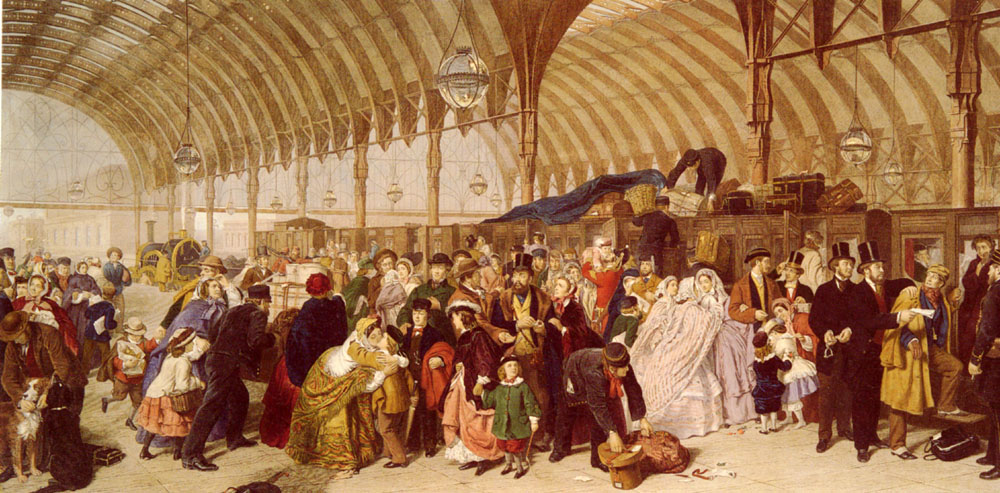
Frith's depiction of Paddington railway station, London

- Paul-Jacques-Aimé Baudry – The Pearl and the Wave
- Albert Bierstadt
  - The Fishing Fleet
  - Guerrilla Warfare, Civil War
- Herman Wilhelm Bissen – Isted Lion (bronze)
- George Price Boyce – At Binsey, near Oxford
- William Burges - Great Bookcase
- Edward William Cooke – The Bay of Tangier
- Gustave Courbet – Femme nue couchée
- Thomas Crawford (posthumous) – Statue of Freedom (bronze for dome of United States Capitol)
- Eyre Crowe – Daniel Defoe in the Pillory
- Edgar Degas - Young Woman with Ibis (completed)
- Eugène Delacroix
  - Ovid among the Scythians (second version)
  - Shipwreck on the Coast
- Augustus Egg – The Travelling Companions
- Anselm Feuerbach – Iphigenia (first version)
- William Powell Frith – The Railway Station
- Walter Greaves – Hammersmith Bridge on Boat-Race Day
- George Elgar Hicks – Changing Homes
- Arthur Hughes – Home from Sea (reworking of The Mother's Grave)
- Jean Auguste Dominique Ingres – The Turkish Bath (original form)
- Eastman Johnson – A Ride for Liberty – The Fugitive Slaves
- Edward Lear – Philæ and Beachy Head (pair of paintings)
- Édouard Manet
  - Music in the Tuileries (National Gallery, London)
  - Little Lange
  - Lola de Valence (Musée d'Orsay, Paris)
  - The Old Musician
  - Mlle.Victorine Meurent in the Costume of an Espada (Metropolitan Museum of Art, New York)
  - Oysters
  - The Street Singer (Museum of Fine Arts, Boston)
- Robert Braithwaite Martineau – The Last Day in the Old Home
- Jan Matejko – Stańczyk
- Jean-Louis-Ernest Meissonier – Napoleon I in 1814
- Jean-François Millet – L'homme à la houe ("The Man With the Hoe")
- William Morris – Tristram and Isoude stained glass panels
- Moritz Daniel Oppenheim – The Kidnapping of Edgardo Mortara
- Moritz von Schwind – The Honeymoon
- Clarkson Stanfield – Shakespeare Cliff, Dover, 1849
- James Tissot – The Return of the Prodigal Son
- G. F. Watts – approximate date
  - Lady Margaret Beaumont and her Daughter
  - Sisters
  - Edith Villiers
- Thomas Webster – Roast Pig
- James McNeill Whistler
  - The Last of Old Westminster
  - Symphony in White, No. 1: The White Girl

== Births ==
- March 17 – Charles Laval, French painter (died 1894)
- March 24 – Frank Weston Benson, American Impressionist painter (died 1951)
- April 26 – Edmund C. Tarbell, American Impressionist painter (died 1938)
- June 14 – Herbert Dicksee, English painter (died 1942)
- July 10 – Helene Schjerfbeck, Finnish painter (died 1946)
- July 14 – Gustav Klimt, Austrian Symbolist painter (died 1918)
- July 29 – Robert Reid, American Impressionist painter (died 1928)
- August 15 – Adam Emory Albright, American painter of figures in landscapes (died 1957)
- September 12 – Carl Eytel, German American artist (died 1925)
- October 26 – Hilma af Klint, Swedish abstract painter and mystic (died 1944)
- November 25 – Katharine Adams, English bookbinder (died 1952)
- December 3 – Charles Grafly, American sculptor (died 1929)

== Deaths ==
- January 3 – Matthew Cotes Wyatt, English painter and sculptor (born 1777)
- February 11 – Elizabeth Siddal, English Pre-Raphaelite artists' model, painter and poet, wife of Dante Gabriel Rossetti, overdose of laudanum (born 1829)
- February 15 – Heinrich Adam, German painter (born 1787)
- March 18 – Charles Bird King, American portrait artist who notably painted Native American delegates visiting Washington, D.C. (born 1785)
- March 19 – Friedrich Wilhelm Schadow, German Romantic painter (born 1789)
- May – Alexandre-François Caminade, French religious and portrait painter (born 1783)
- May 14 – Karl Joseph Brodtmann, Swiss artist, lithographer, printmaker, publisher and bookseller (born 1787)
- July 7 – Friedrich Gauermann, Austrian painter (born 1807)
- July 17 – Étienne Bouhot, French painter and art teacher (born 1780)
- August 7 – William Turner of Oxford, English topographical watercolourist (born 1789)
- August 10 – Erin Corr, Irish engraver (born 1793)
- August 28 – Albrecht Adam, German painter of battles and horses (born 1786)
- September 20 – Peter Andreas Brandt, Norwegian painter and illustrator (born 1792)
- October 29 – John Cox Dillman Engleheart, English miniaturist (born 1784)
- Undated – Jean-Pierre Montagny, French medallist and coiner (born 1789)
