= Petruchio =

Character in The Taming of the Shrew

- The Taming of the Shrew character
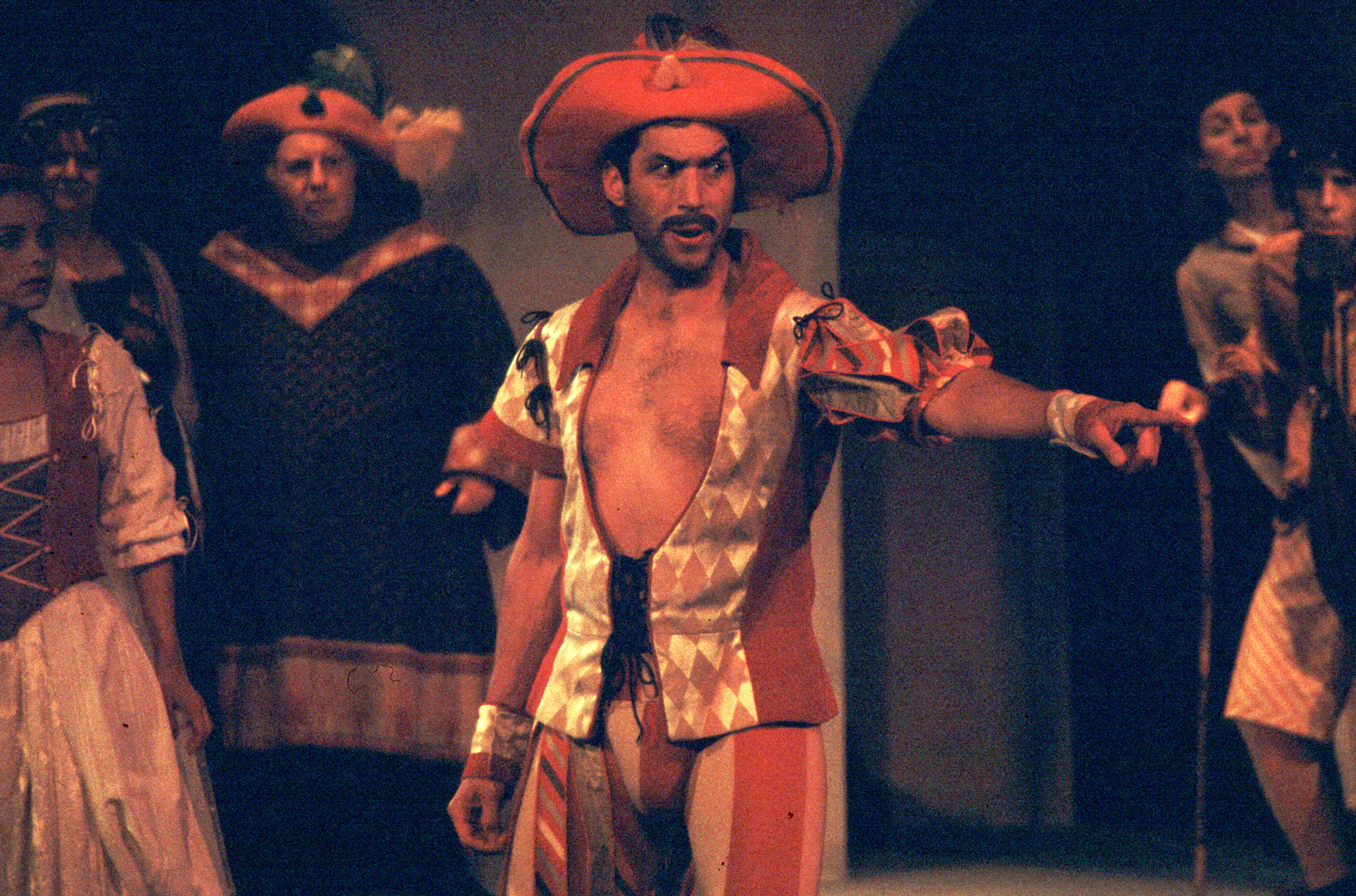
- Petruchio (Kevin Black) in his wedding outfit, in a Carmel Shakespeare Festival production at the outdoor Forest Theater in Carmel, CA, Oct. 2003
- Created by: William Shakespeare
- Portrayed by: Arthur V. Johnson (silent, 1908); Douglas Fairbanks ("talkie", 1929); Alfred Lunt (stage, 1935); Stanley Baker (TV, 1952); Peter O'Toole (stage, 1960); Richard Burton (film, 1967); Raul Julia (stage, 1978); John Cleese (stage, (tv, 1980); Timothy Dalton (stage, 1986); Morgan Freeman (stage, 1990); Neri Marcorè (Italian film, 2004); Rufus Sewell (TV, 2005); David Caves (stage, 2012) Danny Smith (stage, 2018)

Petruchio (/pɪˈtruːkioʊ, -tʃioʊ/ pih-TROO-kee-oh, -chee-oh; an anglicisation of the Italian name Petruccio, pronounced [peˈtruttʃo]) is the male protagonist in Shakespeare's The Taming of the Shrew (c. 1590–1594).

== Plot ==
In the play, Petruchio comes to the town of Padua in the hopes of marrying a wealthy woman. Hortensio suggests that he marry Kate Minola, the daughter of one of the wealthiest men in the city, particularly because Hortensio cannot court her sister Bianca until Kate is married. Petruchio takes an interest in Kate, owing to the dowry he could potentially receive, and agrees. During his first encounter with Kate, he matches her fierce temper and manages to convince her father that she passionately loves him but only pretends to hate him in public. The two are married, with Petruchio arriving at the wedding late and forcing Kate to leave the ceremony feast early.

Petruchio then starts to try to "tame" his wife in a variety of ways. He frightens Kate by yelling at the servants, and he prevents her from eating by insisting that the dishes are not good enough for her. He then offers Kate dresses and jewellery, only to return them saying that they too weren't good enough. When Bianca and Lucentio are married, Petruchio refuses to let Kate go to the wedding unless she agrees with everything he says, regardless of the validity of his claims. He puts her to the test by telling her that a man is a woman and that the sun is the moon – she agrees with both statements.

At the wedding, Petruchio is taunted by Hortensio and Lucentio for having married a "shrew". Petruchio proposes a contest to see which man has the most obedient wife: The three men are to call for their wives to see which ones respond. Of the three women, only Kate comes, and a triumphant Petruchio is the winner. Petruchio then orders Kate to bring the other wives and give a speech telling them to honour their husbands always.

== Character analysis ==
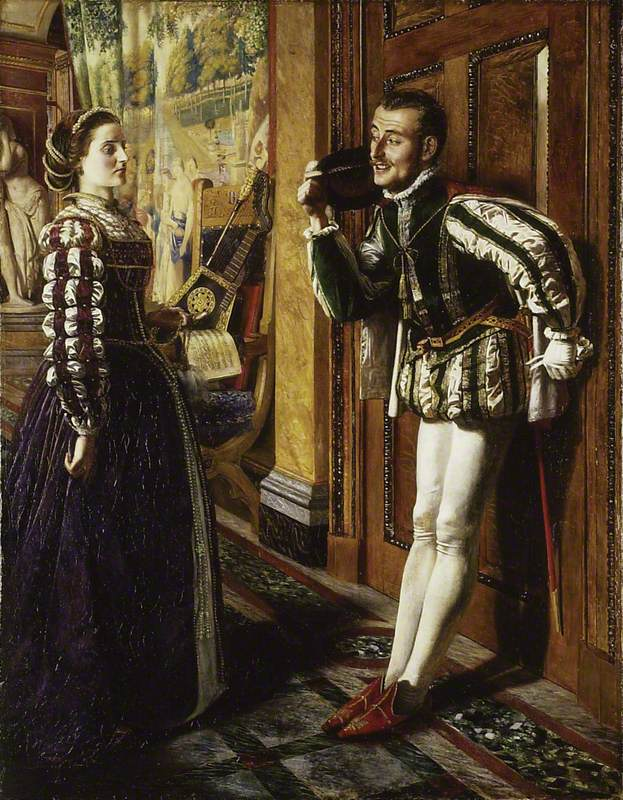
Katherine and Petruchio by Robert Braithwaite Martineau, 1855

Petruchio is debatably the most complex character in The Taming of the Shrew. His actions can be interpreted in several different lights, with each interpretation entirely changing the tone of the play. One popular opinion is that Petruchio is, for the most part, a selfish misogynist determined to tame Katharine for his own convenience and pride. He simply wanted to tame her to be able to say he tamed the most shrewish woman. In this interpretation, Petruchio marries Katharine solely for her dowry. The counterargument is that Petruchio develops love for Katharine and tames her because he sees her shrewishness as a condition that she cannot cure on her own. Another interpretation is that Petruchio likes Katharine for her strong, challenging personality and takes on taming her as a fun challenge.

Petruchio's calculated choice of Katherine in order to assume her monies and status for himself, then calculated and systematic psychological abuse of her is also consistent with narcissism. Narcissistic abuse that is common in abusive marriages includes gaslighting and controlling behaviors that results in complex post traumatic stress disorder (C-PTSD) in the target who will do anything to appease her abuser.

Regardless, Petruchio seems to believe, like most members of Christian society did at the time, that society is most stable if women are submissive to their husbands. There is also some debate about how seriously Petruchio should be taken, and hence how we should interpret the meaning of the play. His ridiculous actions, including his unconventional attire at his wedding and his treatment of Katharine once they are married, are sometimes viewed as a reflection of his descent into madness. On the other hand, some see Petruchio as the fool of the play and attribute his actions to intended comic relief. Petruchio's character is very powerful in that the light in which we view him can change the play from a story of male chauvinism or domestic violence to an absurdist comedy.

== Petruchio acts as the shrew ==
Petruchio marries Katharine to gain wealth. However, he is not content with her shrewish behaviour and he goes through great measures to assert his dominance over her and tame her. He believes that the only way to get through to Katharine is by giving her a taste of her own medicine. Petruchio takes on the role of a shrew to prove to his wife that this kind of behaviour is unpleasant. He makes a scene as he shows up late to his own wedding, and dressed inappropriately for the occasion. He decides that he will be the one to determine when Katharine will eat or sleep, believing that depriving her of her needs makes her more submissive to him. Toward this end, he also toys with her mind. On their journey back to Padua, Petruchio refuses to continue until Katharine agrees with him that the midday sun is the moon.

== Performances ==
In the 1953 musical film remake, Kiss Me Kate, the Petruchio character is portrayed by Howard Keel.

In the 1967 film rendition, he was portrayed by Richard Burton (opposite Elizabeth Taylor as "Kate").

In the 1999 modern-day rom-com teen film adaptation, 10 Things I Hate About You, the character (retitled as Patrick Verona) is portrayed by Heath Ledger.
