= Katherine and Petruchio (painting) =

Painting by Robert Braithwaite Martineau

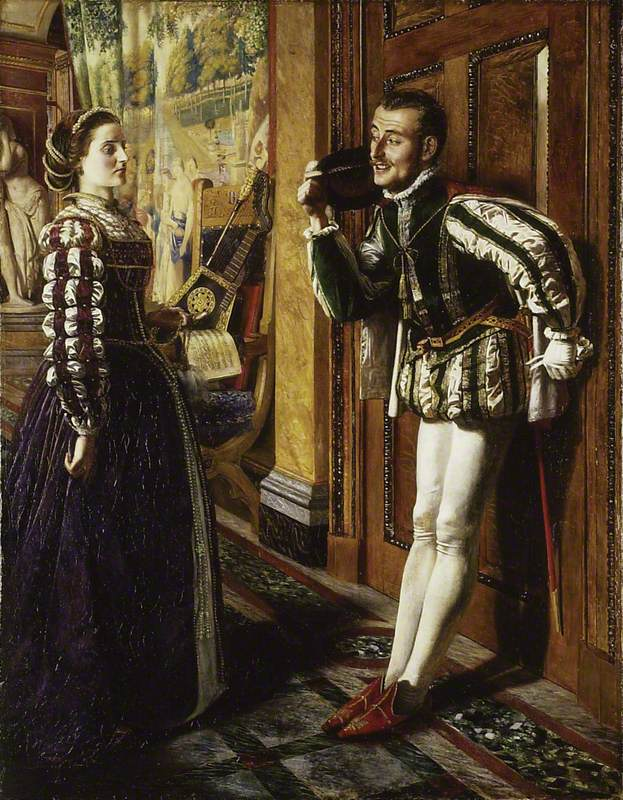
- Artist: Robert Braithwaite Martineau
- Year: 1855
- Type: Oil on canvas, genre painting
- Dimensions: 92 cm × 71 cm (36 in × 28 in)
- Location: Ashmolean Museum, Oxford

Katherine and Petruchio is an 1855 oil painting by the British artist Robert Braithwaite Martineau. It depicts a scene from William Shakespeare's play The Taming of the Shrew in which the ambitious Petruchio attempts to charm and court the heiress Katherina Minola in Padua.

Martineau was associated with the Pre-Raphaelite Brotherhood of the early Victorian era. The painting was displayed at the Royal Academy Exhibition of 1855 at the National Gallery in London. Today it is in the collection of the Ashmolean Museum in Oxford, having been acquired in 1950.

== Bibliography ==
- Ashton, Geoffrey. Shakespeare's Heroines in the Nineteenth Century. Derbyshire Museum Service, 1980.
- Harrison, Colin, Casley, Catherine & Whiteley, Jon. The Ashmolean Museum: Complete Illustrated Catalogue of Paintings. Ashmolean Museum, 2004.
