= Kit's Writing Lesson =

Painting by Robert Braithwaite Martineau

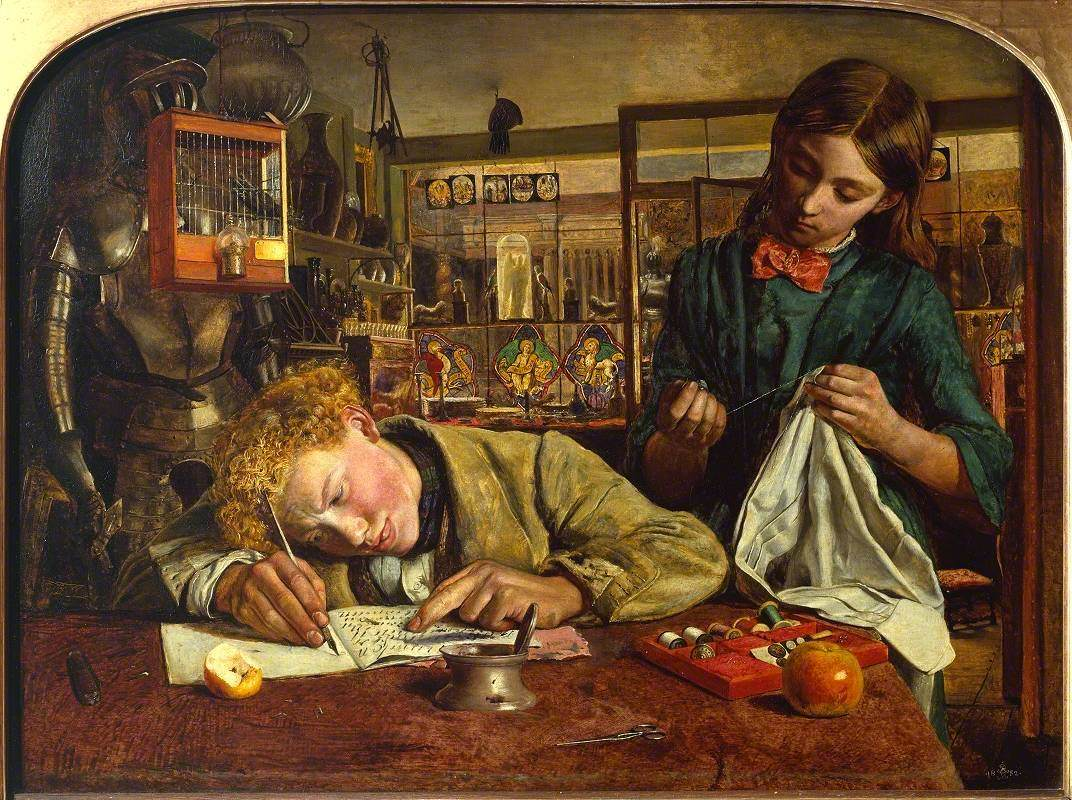
- Artist: Robert Braithwaite Martineau
- Year: 1852
- Type: Oil on canvas, genre painting
- Dimensions: 70.5 cm × 52.1 cm (27.8 in × 20.5 in)
- Location: Tate Britain, London

Kit's Writing Lesson is an oil painting on canvas by the British artist Robert Braithwaite Martineau, from 1852. It depicts a scene from the 1841 novel The Old Curiosity Shop by Charles Dickens. Little Nell is teaching the shop's errand boy Kit how to write. She watches his attempt while she sews a shirt for her grandfather.

Martineau was a member of the Pre-Raphaelite Brotherhood and this painting reflects their technique. The picture was displayed at the Royal Academy Exhibition of 1852 held at the National Gallery, in London. A review in the Liverpool Mercury praised it's attention to detail, but thought it failed to show enough atmosphere. It is now in the collection of the Tate Britain, having been presented to the gallery in 1955.

== Bibliography ==
- Bills, Mark. Dickens and the Artists. Yale University Press, 2012.
- Newall, Christopher. Pre-Raphaelites: Beauty and Rebellion. Liverpool University Press, 2016.
