= The Absinthe Drinker (Manet) =

Painting by Édouard Manet

- Le Buveur d'absinthe (French)
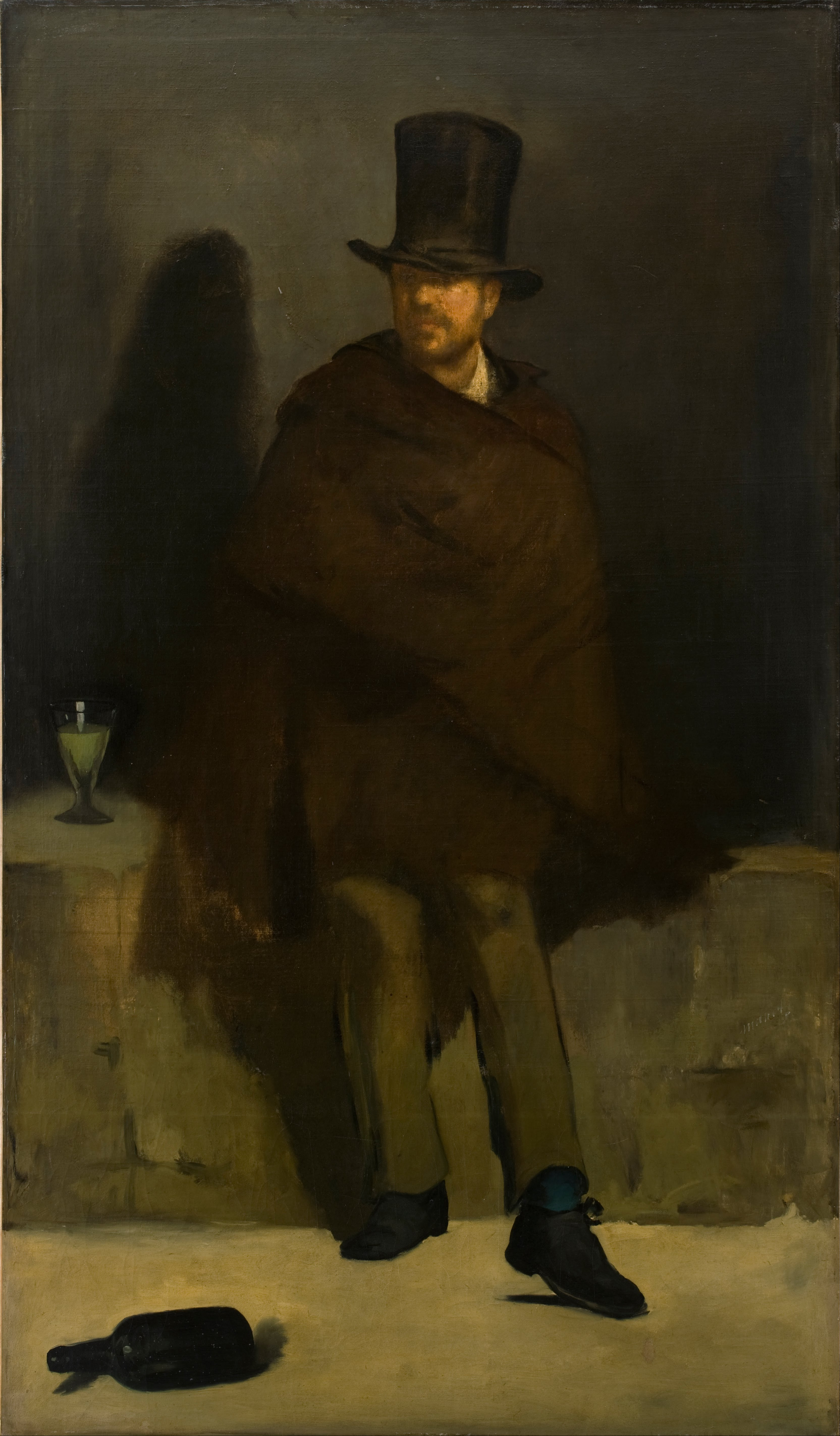
- Artist: Édouard Manet
- Year: c. 1859
- Medium: Oil on canvas
- Dimensions: 180.5 cm × 105.6 cm (71.1 in × 41.6 in)
- Location: Ny Carlsberg Glyptotek; Copenhagen

The Absinthe Drinker (French: Le Buveur d'absinthe) is an early painting by Édouard Manet, executed c. 1859, considered to be his first major painting and first original work. It is now in the collection of the Ny Carlsberg Glyptotek, in Copenhagen.

== Background and history ==
Manet became a student in the studio of Thomas Couture from 1850. However, he grew to dislike his master's Salon style and in 1856 set up his own studio. Little of Manet's earliest work survives and much may have been destroyed by Manet himself.

The Absinthe Drinker is a full-length portrait of an alcoholic chiffonnier (rag-picker) named Collardet who frequented that area around the Louvre in Paris. Collardet is painted in mostly brown, grey and black tones. He is standing, wears a black top hat and is wrapped in a brown cloak, like an aristocrat; he leans on a ledge with the empty bottle discarded on the ground by his feet. Manet later added a half-full glass of absinthe on the ledge. Influenced by the realism of Gustave Courbet, the work shows a mundane subject on a large scale, measuring 180.5 centimetres (71.1 in) high by 105.6 centimetres (41.6 in) wide. Manet may have been inspired by the poem Le Vin des chiffonniers ("The rag-pickers' wine") in Charles Baudelaire's 1857 collection Les Fleurs du mal, from the paintings of ordinary people by Diego Velázquez (particularly his paintings of Aesop and Menippus), and from Watteau's L'Indifférent.

Nearing the completion of the painting, Manet showed it to his former master. Asked for his opinion, Couture is said to have retorted: "An absinthe drinker! And they paint abominations like that! My poor friend, you are the absinthe drinker. It is you who have lost your moral sense". (Note: The poet Paul Verlaine was an absinthe drinker in his last (alcoholic) days)

The Absinthe Drinker was the first work that Manet submitted to the Paris Salon of 1859. It was rejected with only Eugène Delacroix voting in its favour. Part of the reason for its rejection may be its subject; absinthe was thought to be addictive and considered morally degenerate, and this was one of the earliest depictions of absinthe in art. The painting, however, also has technical faults; it is unevenly finished, with brushstrokes visible in places, and the legs join awkwardly with the subject's body. According to art historian Charles F. Stuckey, the painting presented in 1859 may have been significantly different and inferior to the current version, with the subject's legs and the absinthe glass not depicted. Refusal of other works by young painters led eventually to the creation of the Salon des Refusés in 1863.

Manet continued to revise the work after 1859 and inserted the same cloaked figure into his 1862 painting The Old Musician. The original full-length portrait was cut down to three-quarter length by 1867 when it was exhibited by Manet with 56 other works in a self-funded retrospective at the Exposition Universelle held in Paris. In 1872, Manet sold The Absinthe Drinker and 22 other paintings to the art dealer Paul Durand-Ruel "for 35,000 francs, at the prices he [Manet] was asking". The glass of absinthe was a late addition, between 1867 and 1872.

The painting was sold to opera singer Jean-Baptiste Faure in 1906 and exhibited at the Statens Museum for Kunst in Copenhagen in 1914 when it was acquired for the Ny Carlsberg Foundation. It was one of the first modern works added to the collection at the Ny Carlsberg Glyptotek, where it is still held.

== Inspirations ==
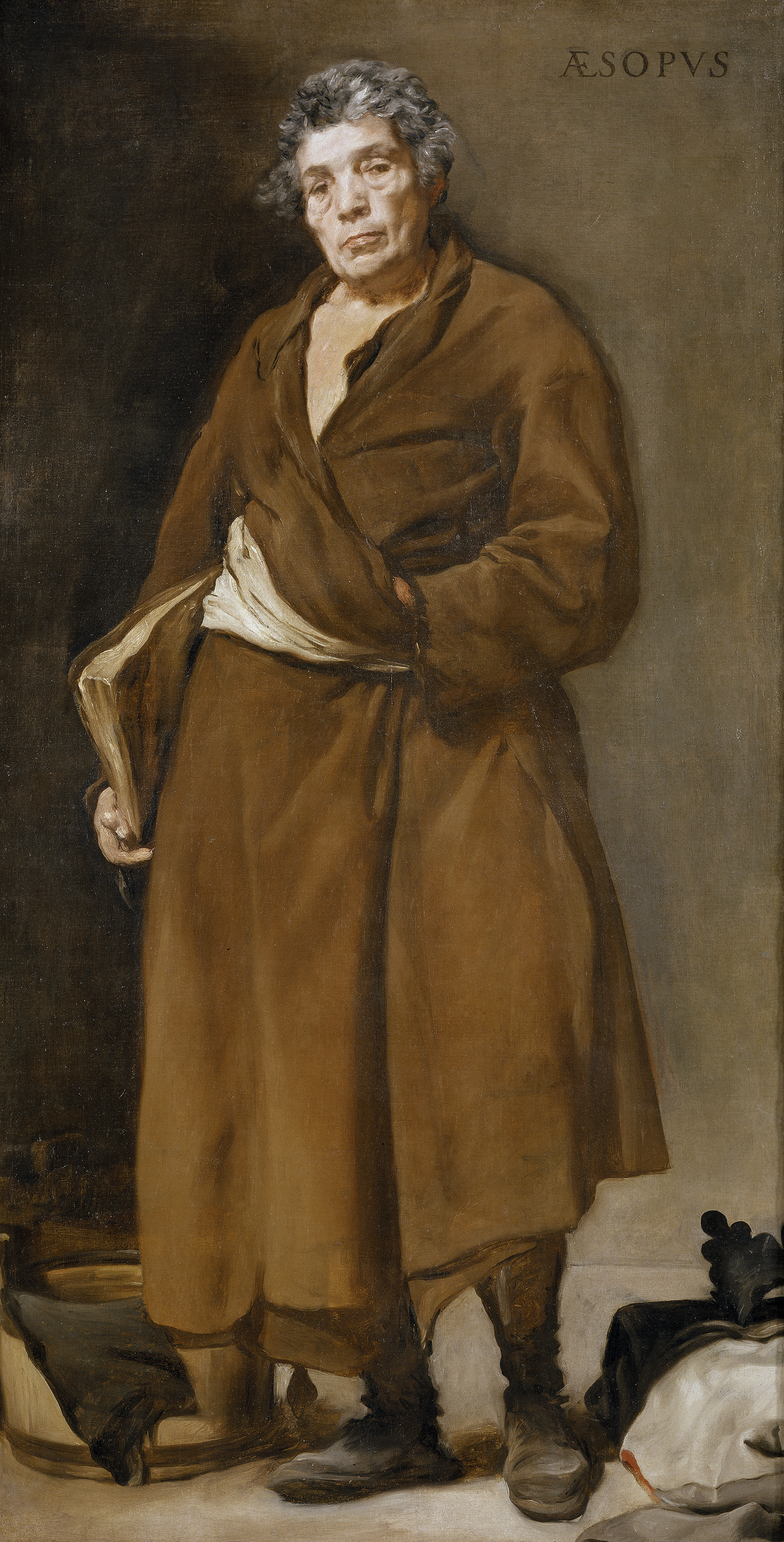
Aesop by Velázquez

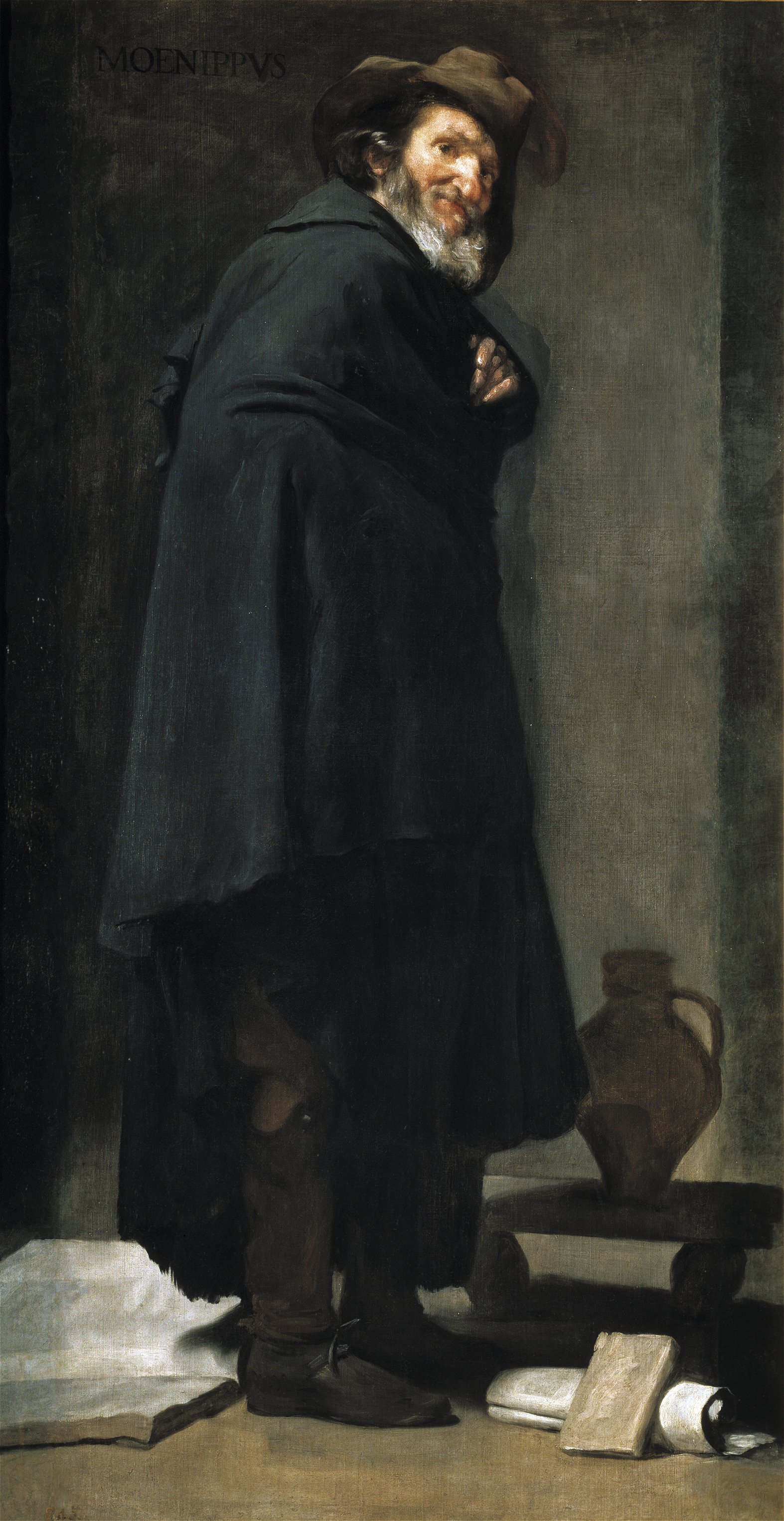
Menippus by Velázquez

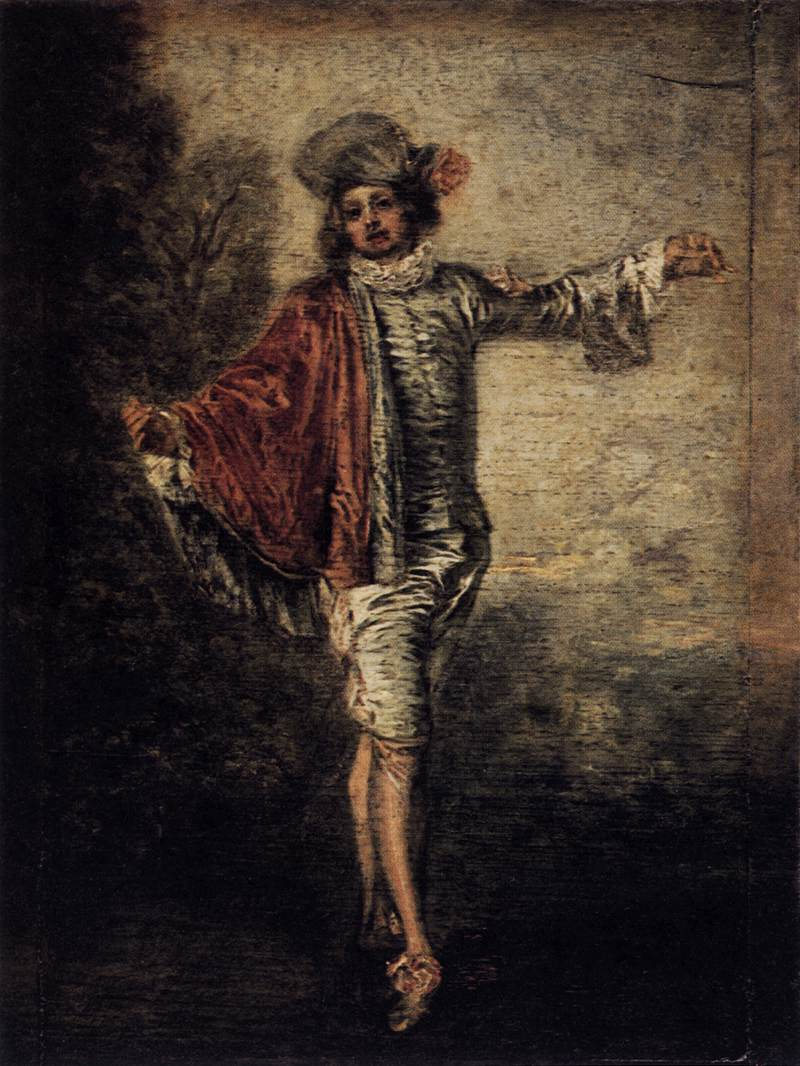
L'Indifférent by Watteau

== See also ==
- L'Absinthe by Edgar Degas
- List of paintings by Édouard Manet
- 1859 in art
