= Little Lange =

C. 1861 painting by Édouard Manet

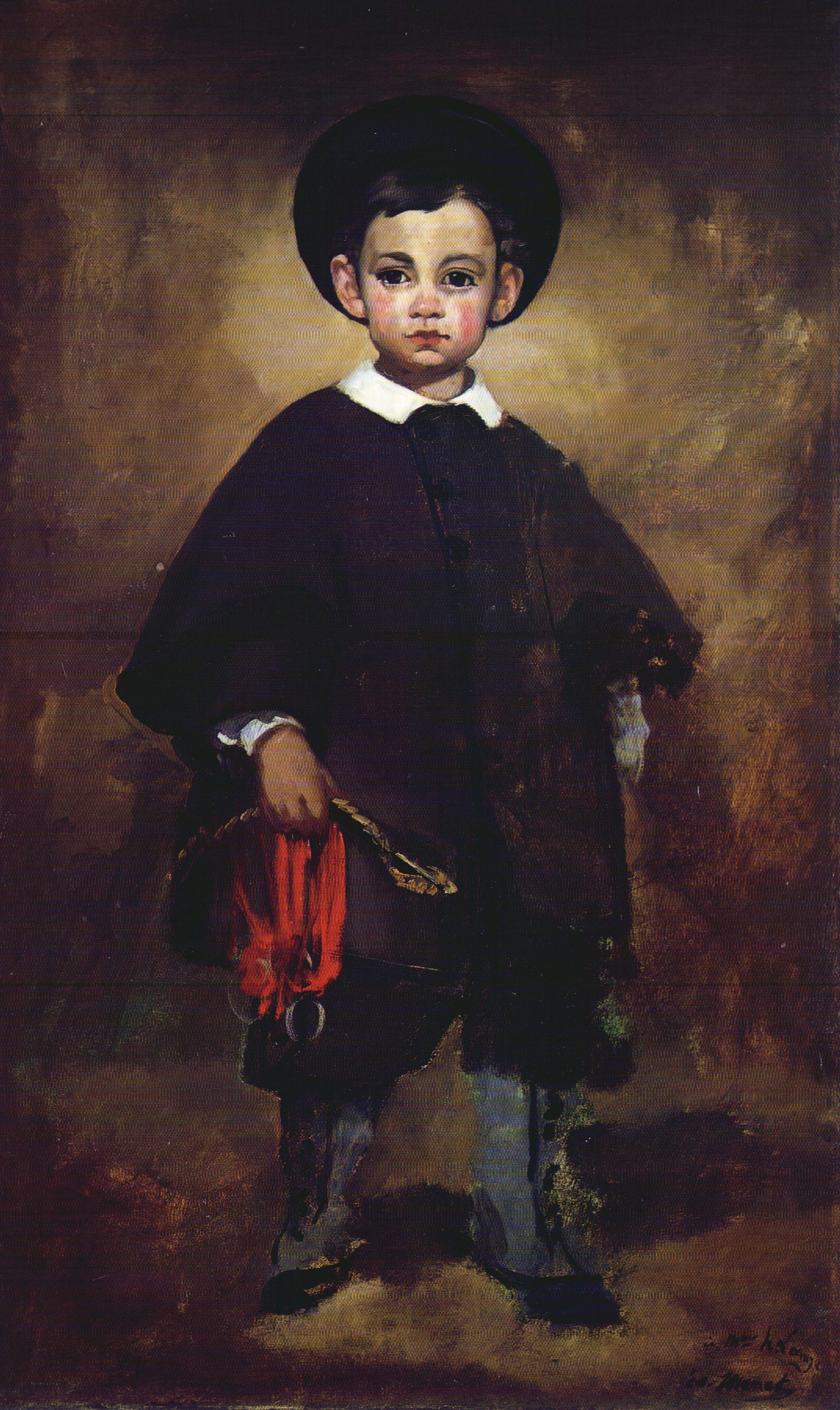
- Artist: Édouard Manet
- Year: 1861
- Medium: oil on canvas
- Dimensions: 117 cm × 71 cm (46 in × 28 in)
- Location: Staatliche Kunsthalle Karlsruhe; Karlsruhe, Germany
- Website: museum's catalogue

Little Lange (Le Petit Lange) is a c.1861 oil-on-canvas painting by Édouard Manet, now on the Staatliche Kunsthalle Karlsruhe. It shows a boy around five years old from the Lange family, who were friends of the artist. Its dark palette is reminiscent of Spanish Golden Age works as well as Antoine Watteau's Gilles (Louvre). Produced early in the painter's career, the work's execution is sketchy in places and prefigures his later Impressionist work.

== Subject and dating ==
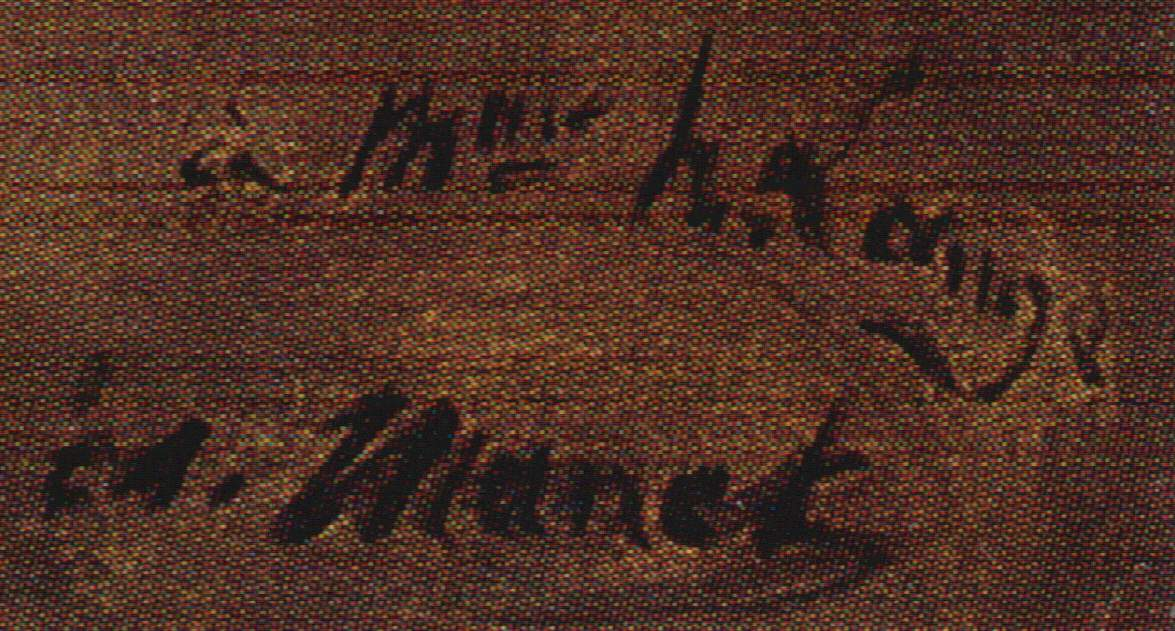
Dedication and signature

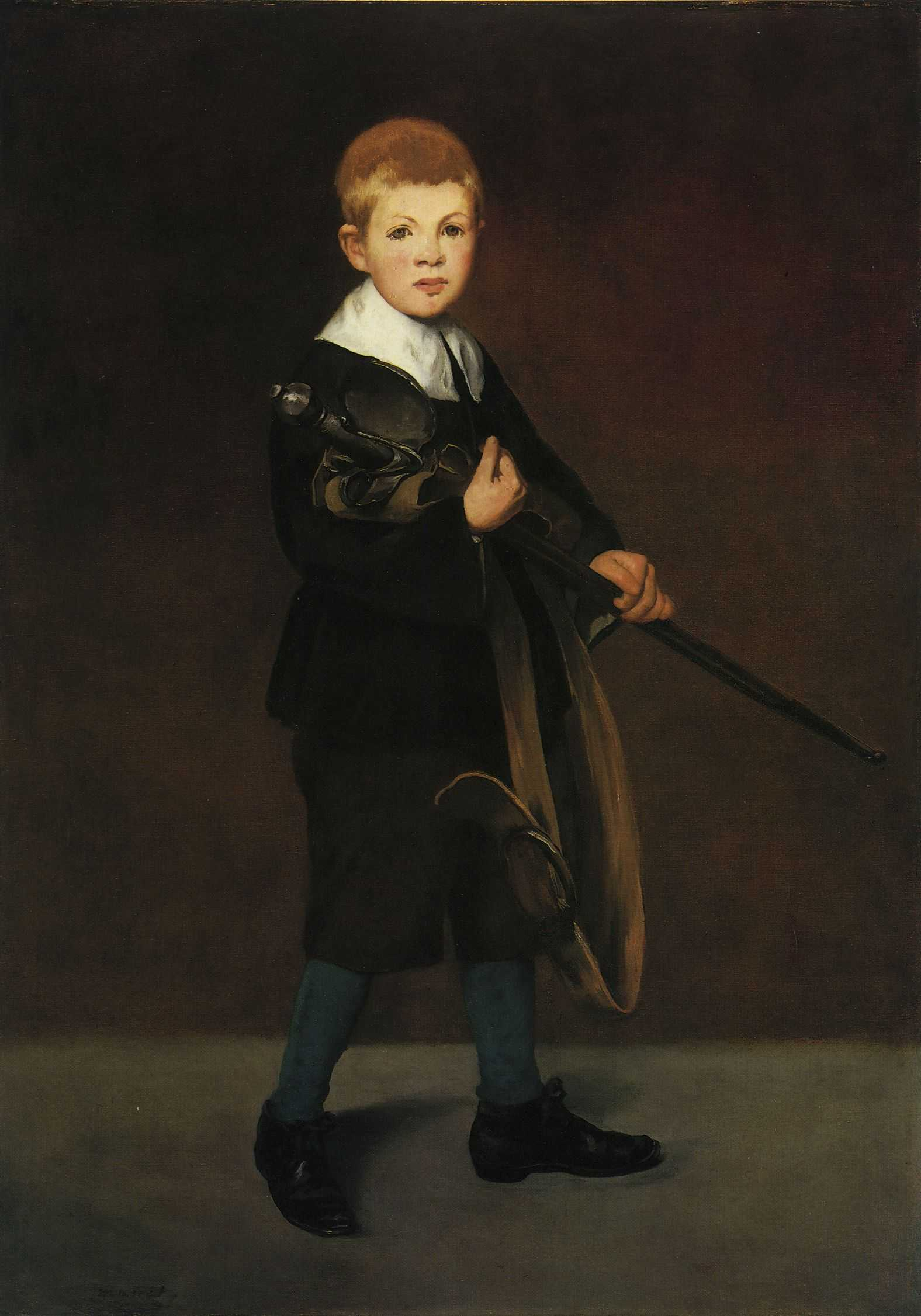
Édouard Manet : Boy with a Sword, 1860–61

Art historians have long had problems identifying the boy portrayed in the painting. The issue is complicated by the work's dating and where it falls in the chronology of Manet's oeuvre. Manet himself placed the dedication "à Mme h. Lange" in the lower left-hand corner of the work, below his signature "éd. Manet" (the art historian Juliet Wilson-Bareau observes that the letter "h" could instead be an "n"). The dedication suggests that the boy is a son of a Mrs Lange, though this does not explain the presence of the initial before the surname. On the other hand, the surname Lange is also handwritten in a Manet family photograph album under a carte de visite of a seated man – it was taken in the Dagron studio at 66 rue Neuve des Petits-Champs. Manet's biographer Adolphe Tabarant questioned Léon Leenhoff about the artist's personal environment – Leenhoff was an illegitimate son of Manet, though the painter did not know his paternity. According to Leenhoff, Madame Lange was one of those who attended the weekly Tuesday literary salon held by Manet's wife and mother.

This photograph album may also offer evidence on the work's precise date, which is unknown. Next to it is a photograph of an unknown girl, on whose back is inscribed the year 1861. This leads Juliet Wilson-Bareau to conclude that Monsieur de Lange's carte de visite dates to the same year. It is therefore plausible to conclude the Manet and Lange families were then directly related. Art historians have also compared Little Lange and its themes to Manet's Child with a Sword (1860–61) and The Old Musician (1862).

More evidence on the Lange family is to be found in letters between the Danish art collector Vilhelm Hansen and Manet's friend and biographer Théodore Duret. In 1916 Hansen became interested in the work and Duret wrote to him that the child in the portrait was one of the sons of a Monsieur Lange. Duret also mentioned that Lange was one of Ferdinand de Lesseps's collaborators on building the Suez Canal, the construction of which began in 1858. The Wildenstein Institute published a catalogue raisonné of Manet's work in 1975 – Sophie Pietri of the institute has also supplied information that the boy's father was Daniel Adolphus Lange. No further evidence on the boy's precise identity arose from research for Manet exhibitions in Paris and New York in 2002 and 2003 and so it cannot definitely be identified with Daniel Adolphus Lange's son.

== Influences ==
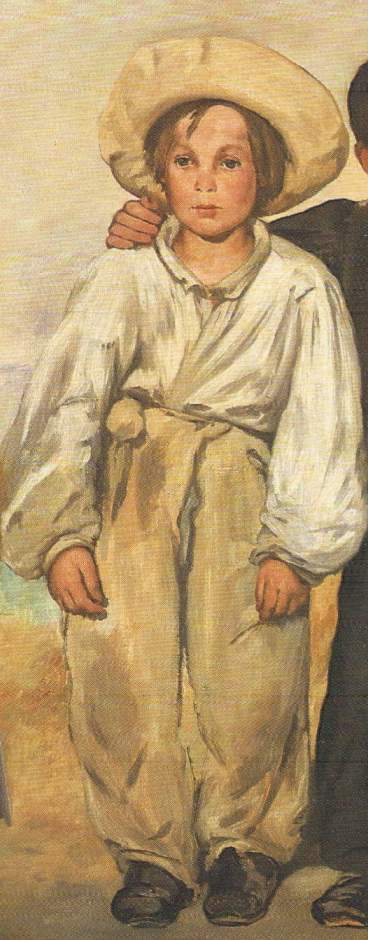
Detail of The Old Musician, to compare to Watteau's Gilles

Spanish art and culture were in fashion in the Paris of the 1860s, partly because of Eugénie de Montijo's Spanish origins and partly owing to a Spanish theatre company putting on folklore shows. Early in that decade Manet copied a number of Diego Velázquez's works in the Louvre – he was his favourite Spanish painter. He also knew other works of his such as Infante Don Carlos from reproductions in Charles Blanc's Histoire des peintres de toutes les écoles. The artist's influence on Manet is particularly visible in his Boy with a Sword (1861), who is dressed in 17th-century Spanish costume and shown in matching shades which directly refer back to the Spanish painter, although art historians argue that those shades are not solely down to Velázquez's influence. Others such as Jan Lauts speak of "Spanish black" in Manet's palette. The boy's gaze and the clothes' style and colours are all directly comparable to Little Lange. Both works show a young boy standing in front of a brown background, although Boy is painted in a more classical manner than Lange.

Goya was also a major influence on the work, particularly his Portrait of Victor Guye (1810), which also shows a boy dressed in black directly engaging the viewer's gaze in front of a dark background. His Portrait of Pepito Costa y Bonelis also has a boy against a dark background, in a similar pose to that in Lange and with a wooden horse and other toys, which may be echoed in Manet's Lange by the whip and bridle held by the boy. Pepito also shows its subject holding a hat with a red plume, possibly echoed by the red in the bridle of Lange.

Art historians also consider the work may have been influenced by Antoine Watteau's Gilles, which Manet could have studied in the Louvre, with its life-size face and near-identical pose. Art historians also argue that the hat in Lange refers back to Gilles and that Lange (and even more so The Old Musician) both draw on the melancholy atmosphere of Gilles.

Spanish Painters and Watteau

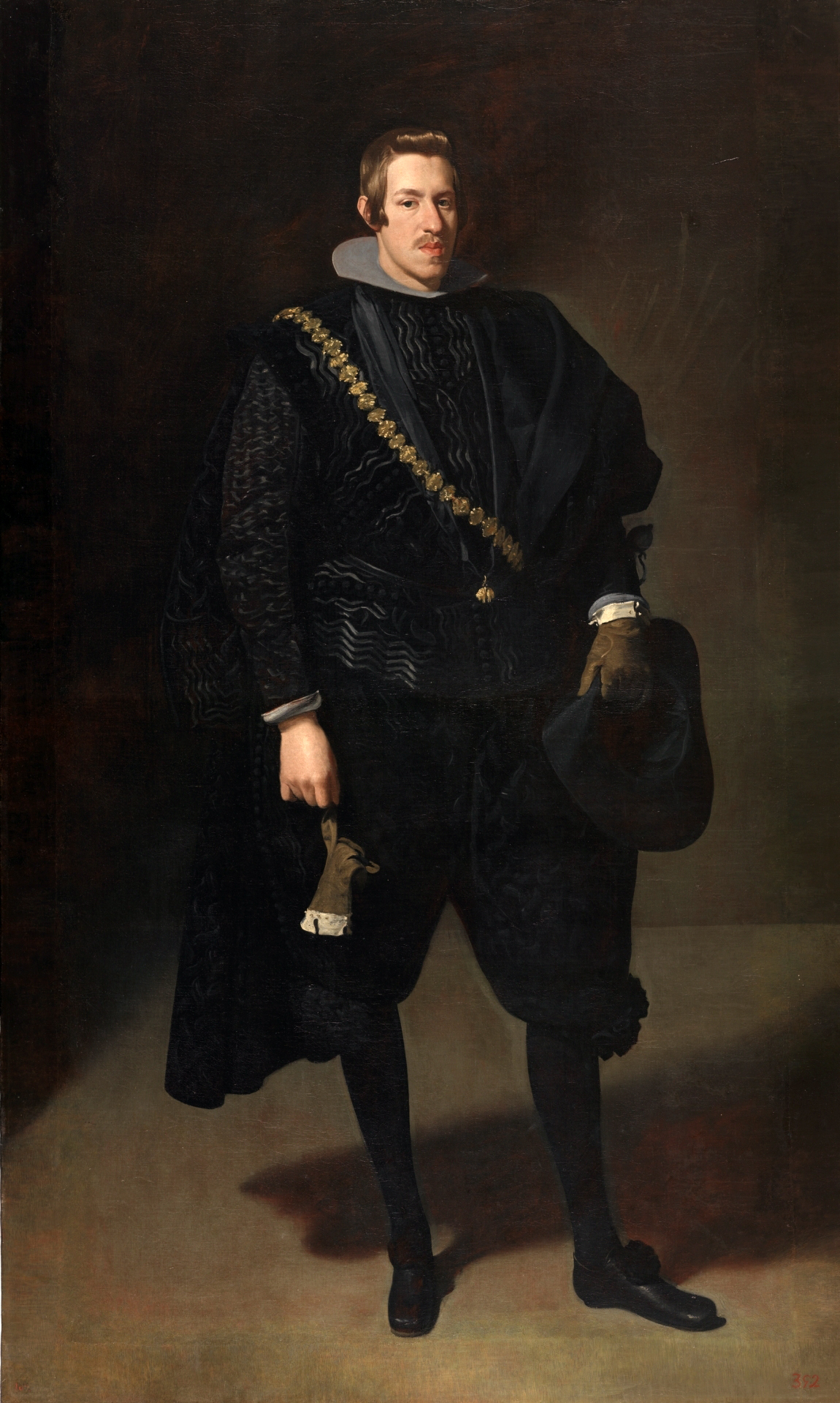
Diego Velazquez:
Infante Don Carlos
1626–27

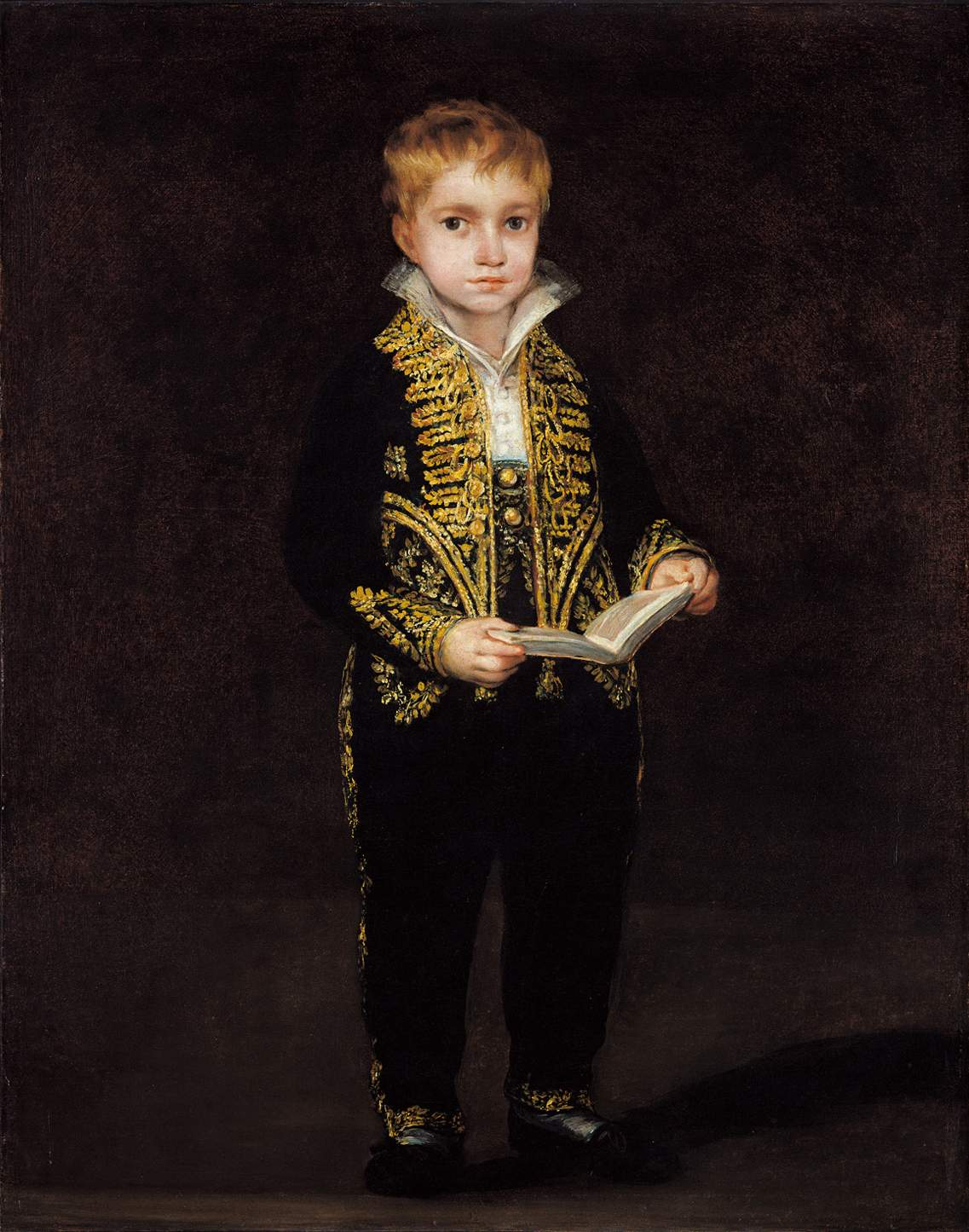
Francisco de Goya:
Victor Guye
1810

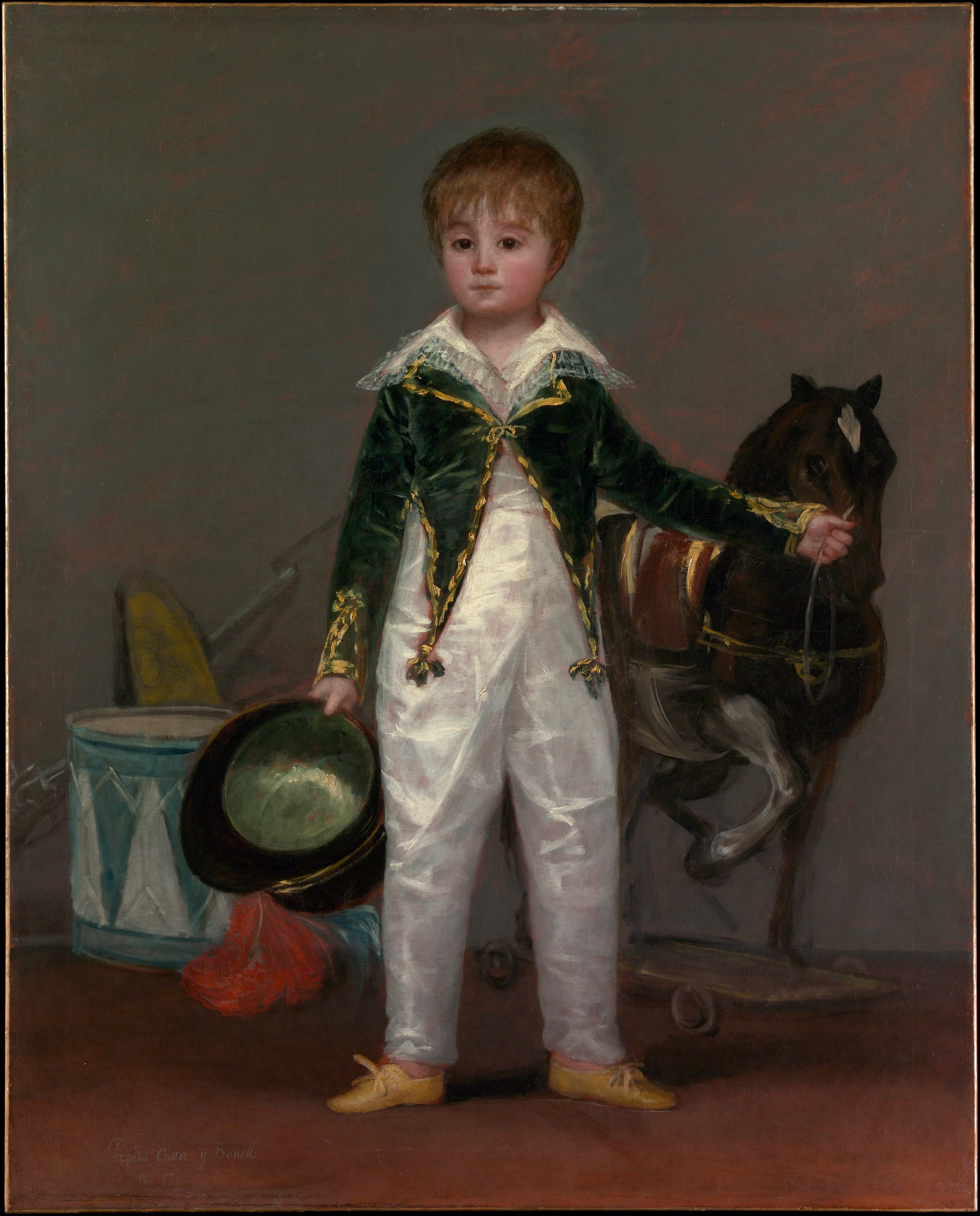
Francisco de Goya:
Pepito Costa y Bonelis
c. 1813

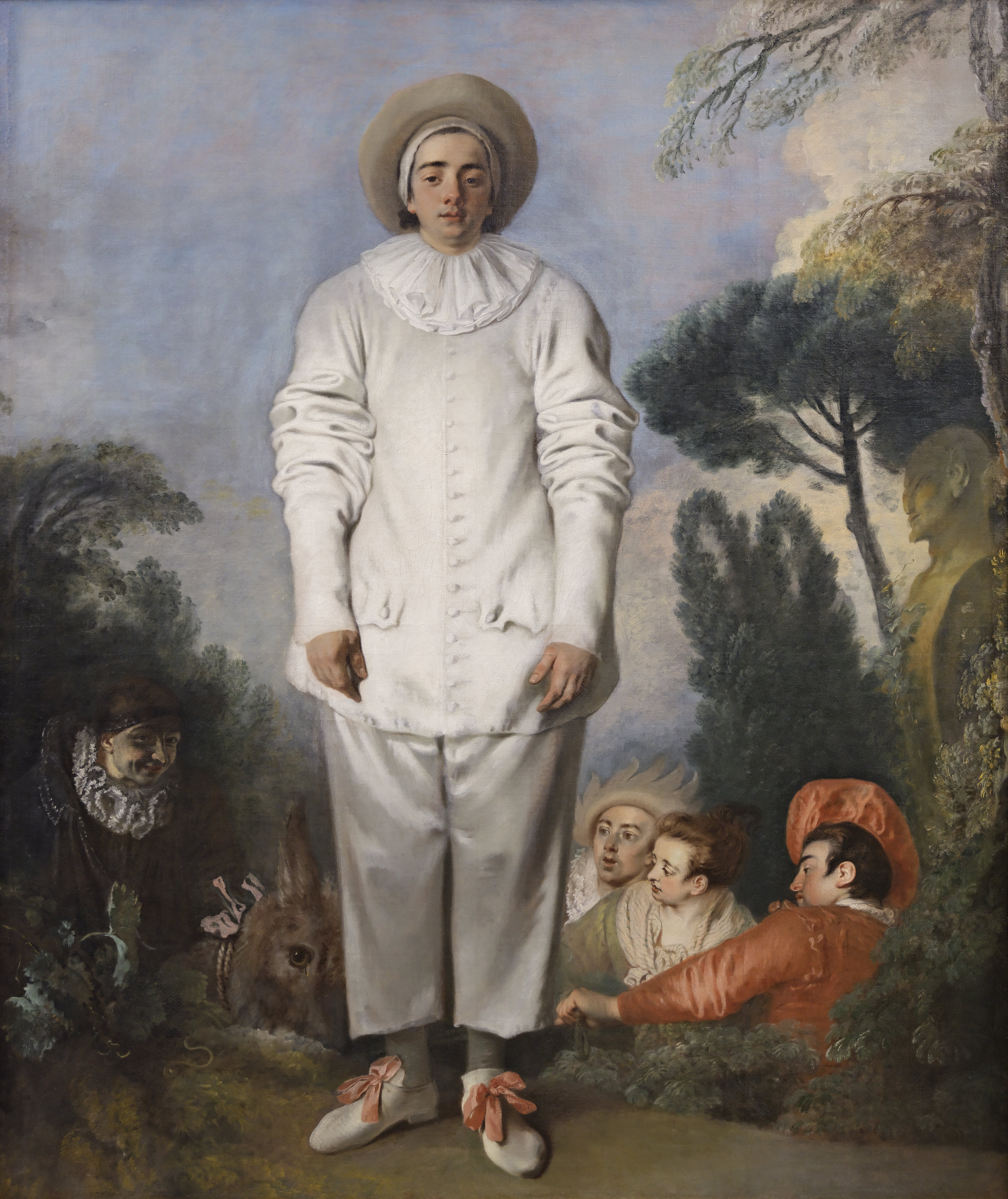
Antoine Watteau:
Gilles
1717-1719

== Child portraiture - Manet and others ==
This and other 1860s child portraits by Manet are youthful works by the artist, even if their sometimes sketchy style prefigures his impressionist works from the 1870s and 1880s. After Lange, children mainly appeared as part of a larger work or in profile in Manet's work – for example, his 1862 Music in the Tuileries includes two children playing as just one part of a representation of Parisian society and his 1866 The Fifer (still strongly Spanish-influenced) draws closer to his impressionist style.

Little Jacques Hoschedé in the Garden shows a point in this evolution. As with Lange, it shows the young son of a family friend, but in lighter brushwork and a brighter palette. Painted only two years before Manet's death, Henry Bernstein as a Child shows more thematic similarities to Lange from twenty years before, with a boy in a white costume, lifesize, in a near-identical pose, holding another black hat, with a similarly direct gaze and again against a sketchy brown background.

Children in Manet's art

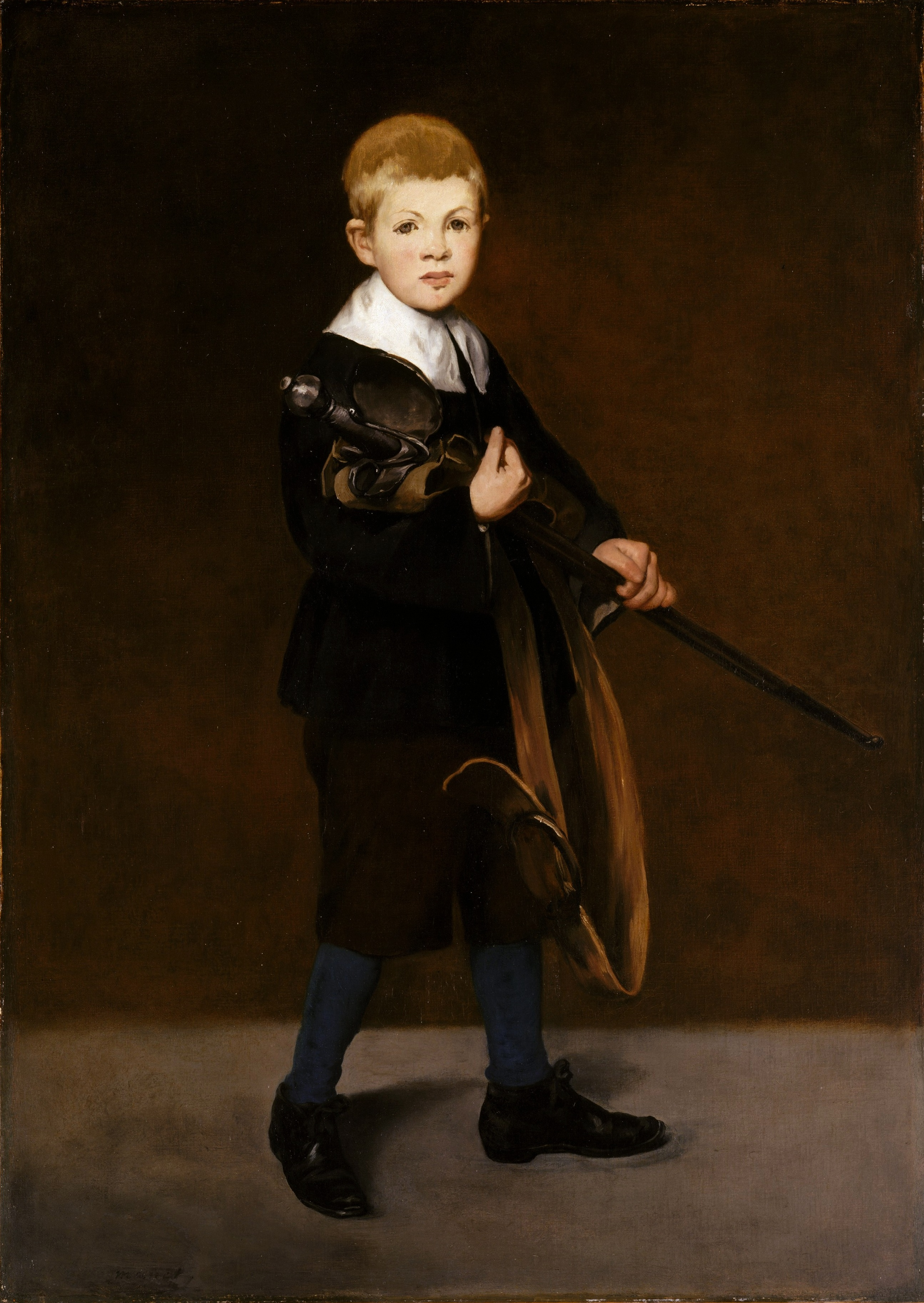
Boy with a Sword
1861

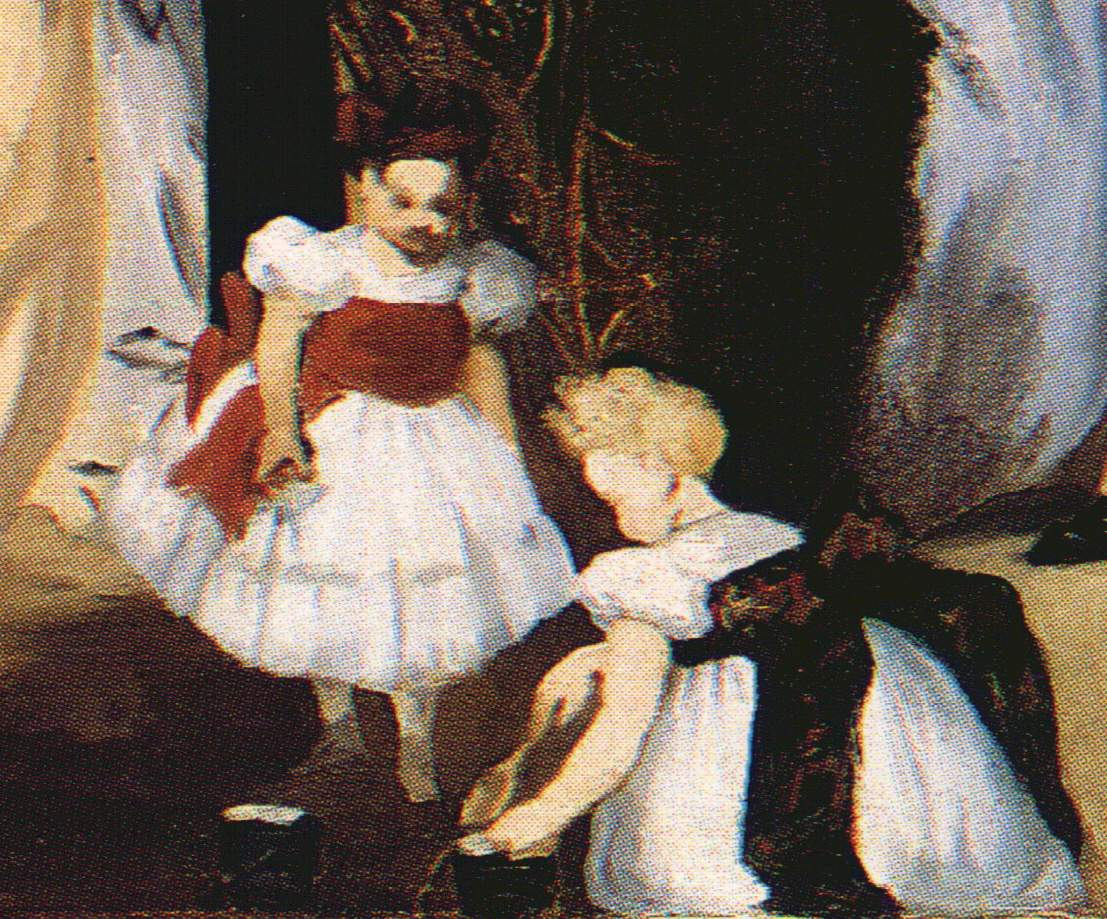
Children playing in Music in the Tuileries
1862

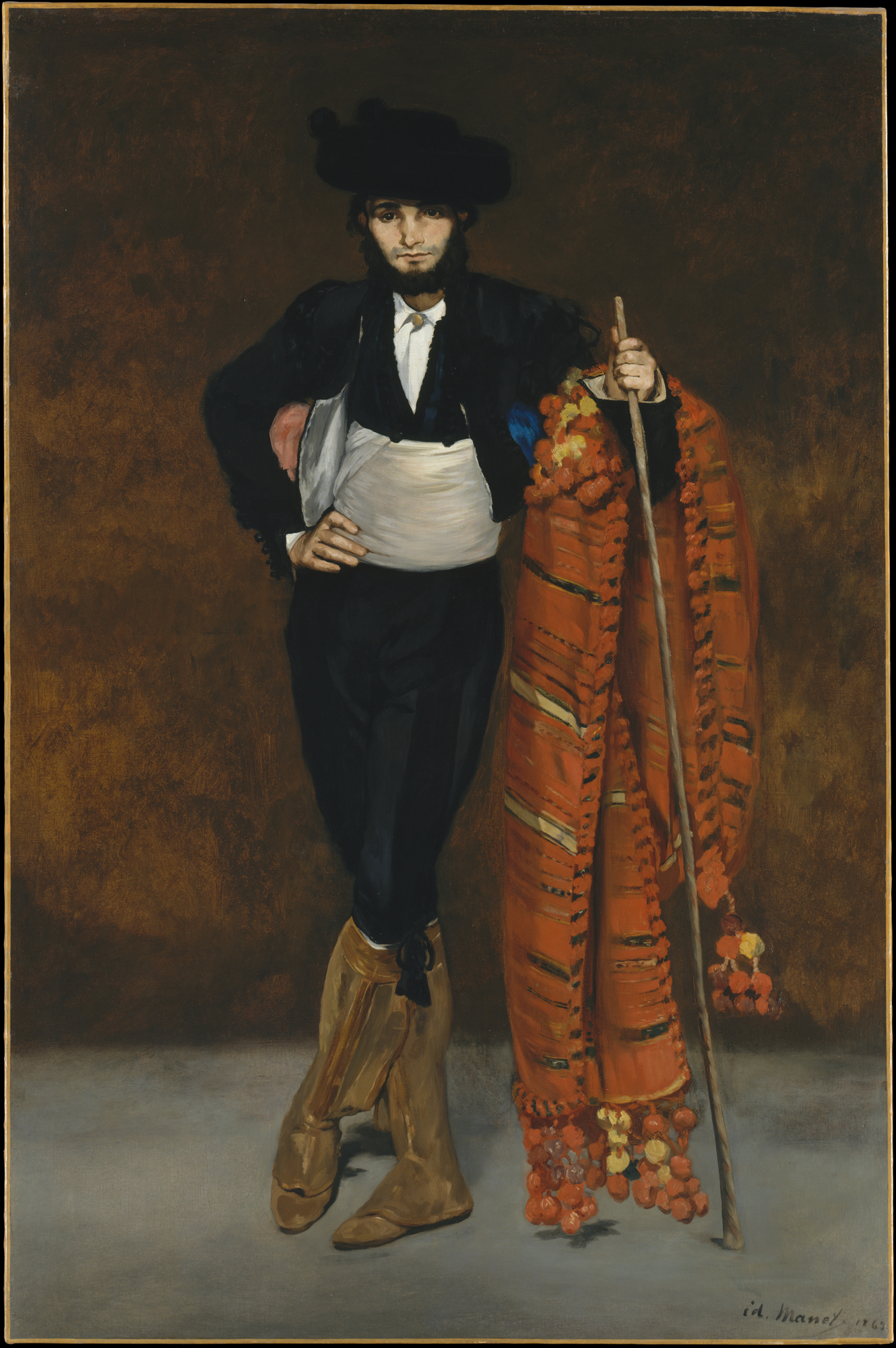
Young Man Dressed as a Majo
1863

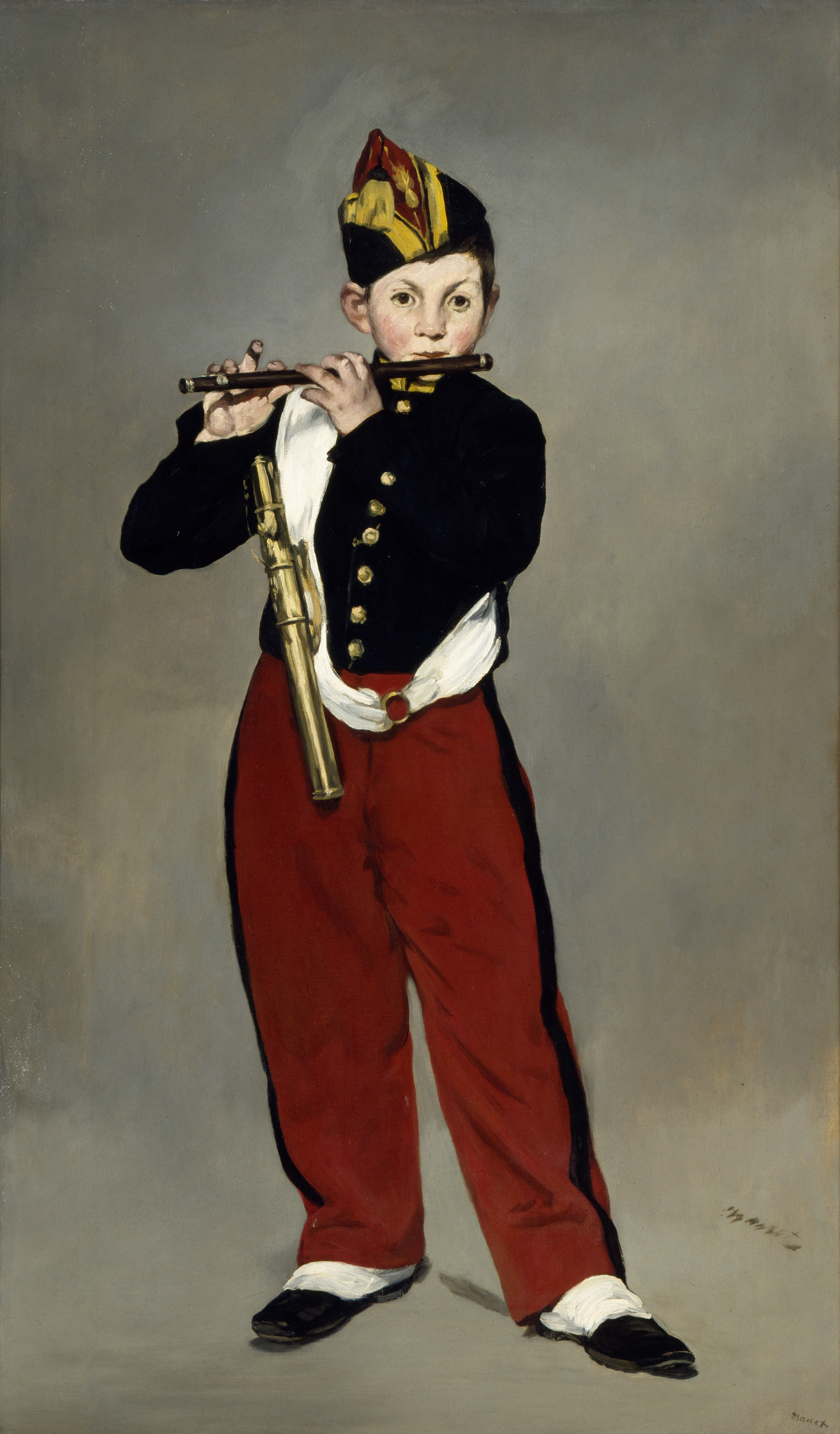
The Fifer
1866

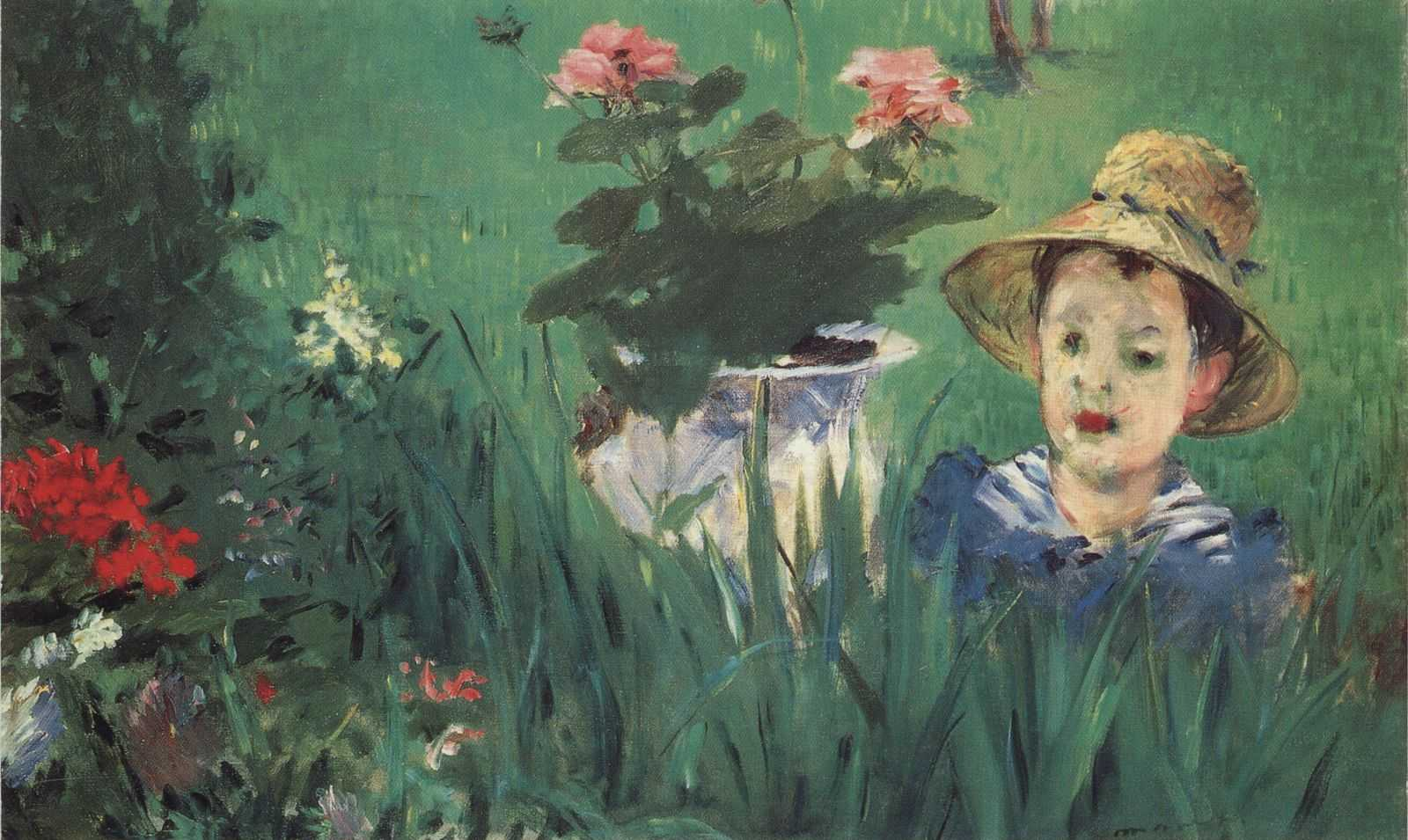
Little Jacques Hoschedé in a Garden
1878

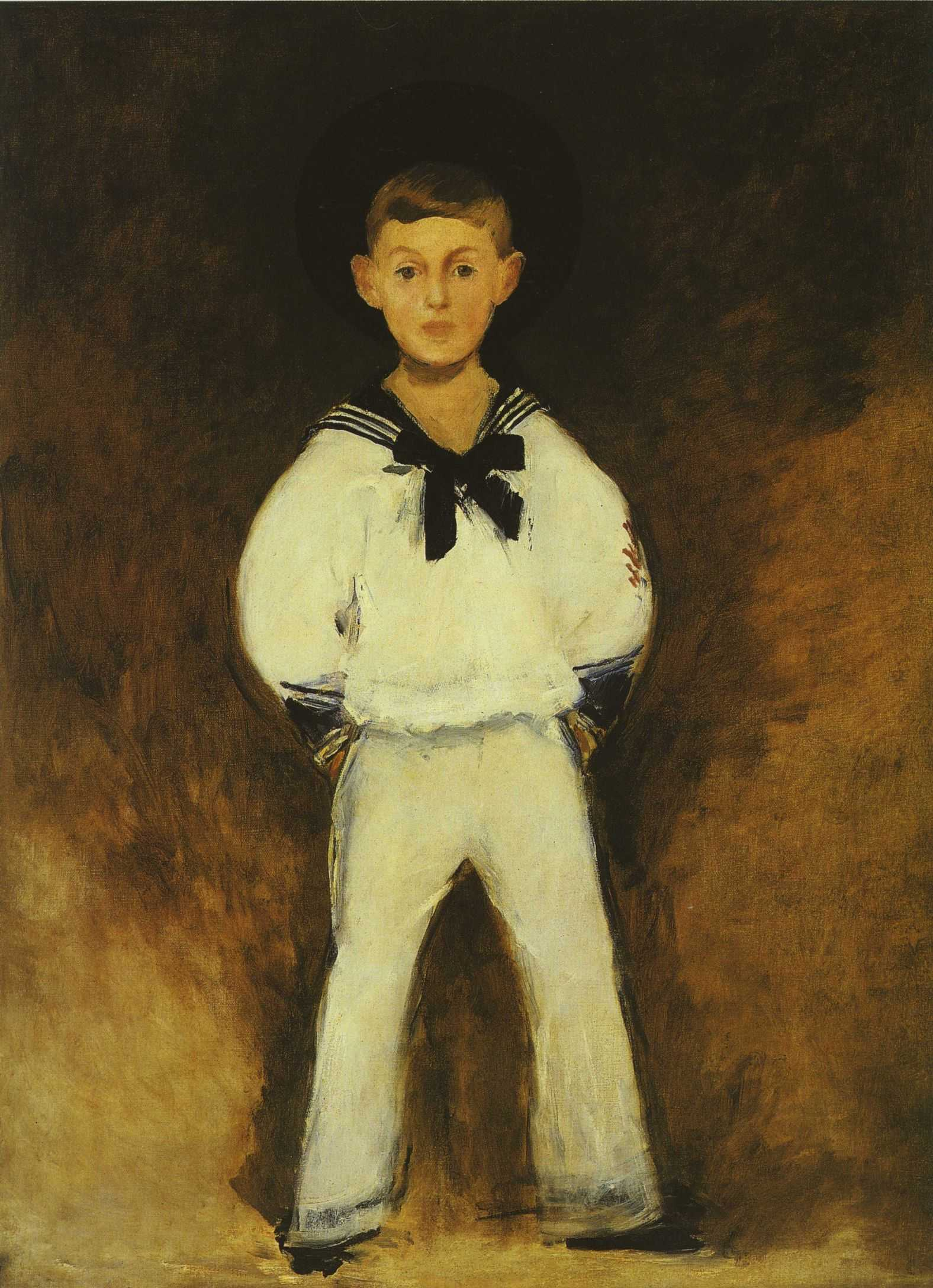
Henry Bernstein as a Child
1881

Other artists of the time were influenced by Velázquez and Goya. This can be seen in the child portraits Marie-Anne, the Artist's Daughter by Carolus-Duran, a friend of Manet, or Portrait of Robert de Cévrieux by John Singer Sargent. Dressed in black, both these children are posed in front of a dark background and – as in Lange – their gaze directly holds that of the viewer. Comparable accessories like the bridle and whip in Lange are to be found in Impressionist child portraits such as Claude Monet's Jean Monet on a Rocking Horse, although that work shows its subject playing, unlike Lange. That work and Pierre-Auguste Renoir's Child with a Whip both show a child in a natural environment rather than against a dark background, although that work by Renoir shows a child in a very static pose as in Lange

Child Portraits by Manet's Contemporaries

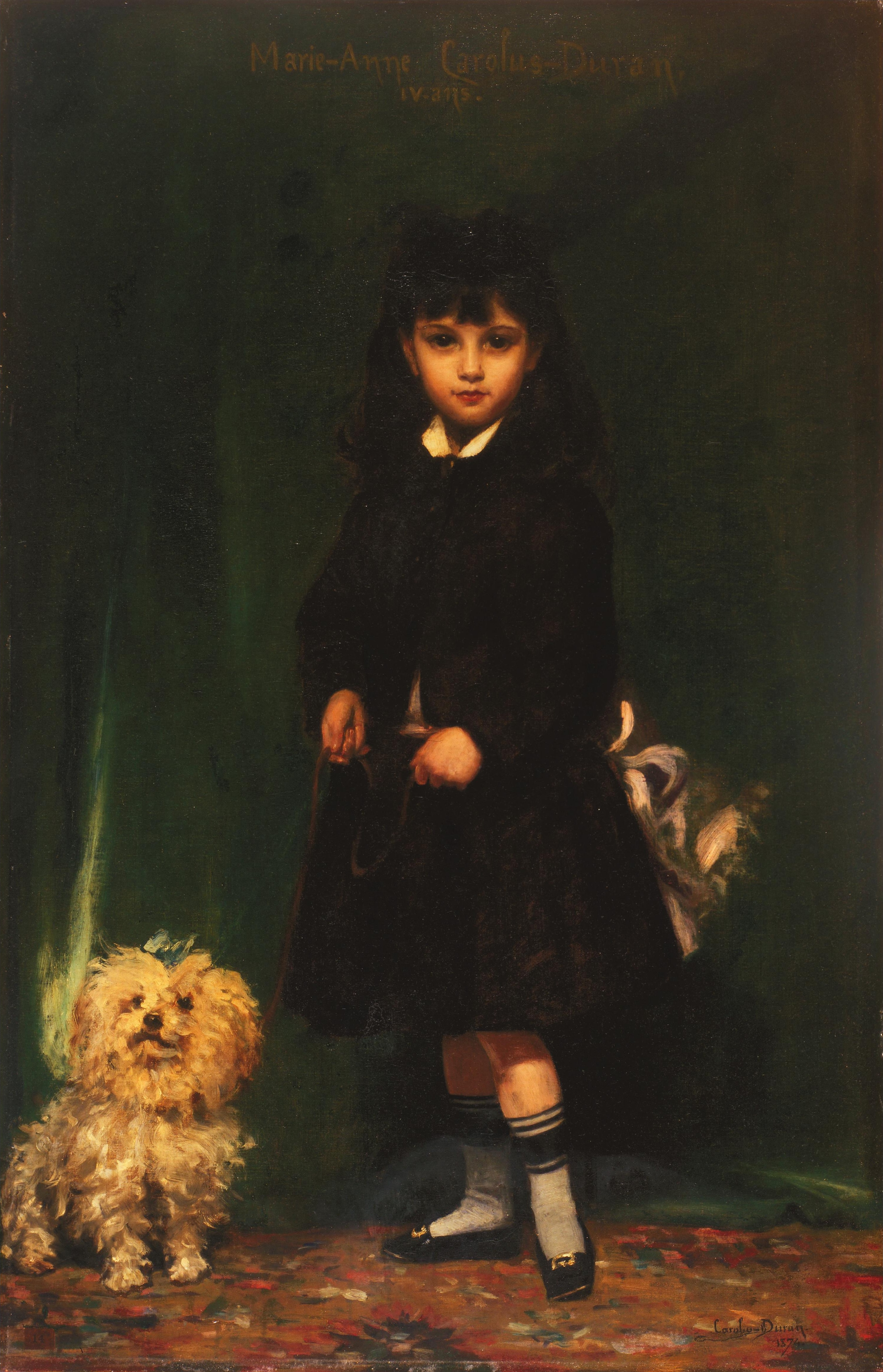
Carolus-Duran:
Marie-Anne, the Artist's Daughter
1874

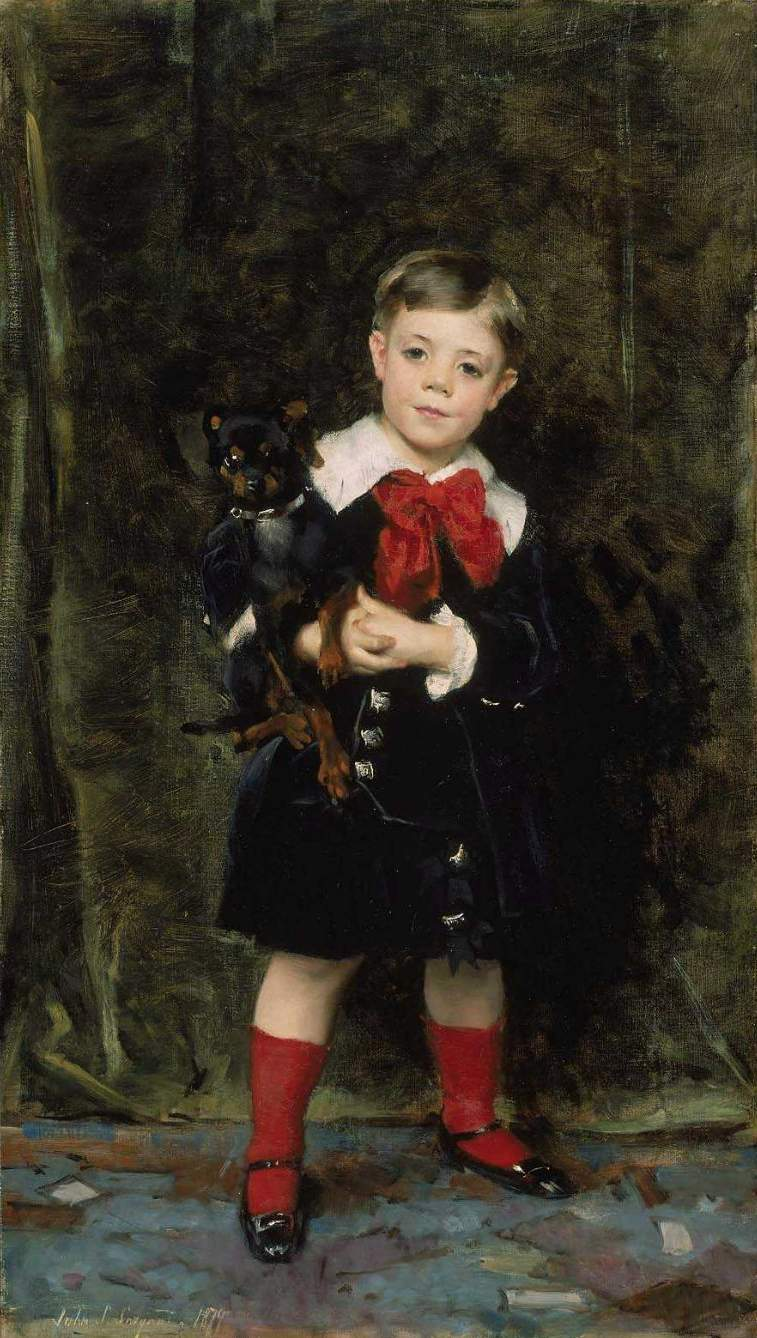
John Singer Sargent :
Robert de Cevrieux
1879

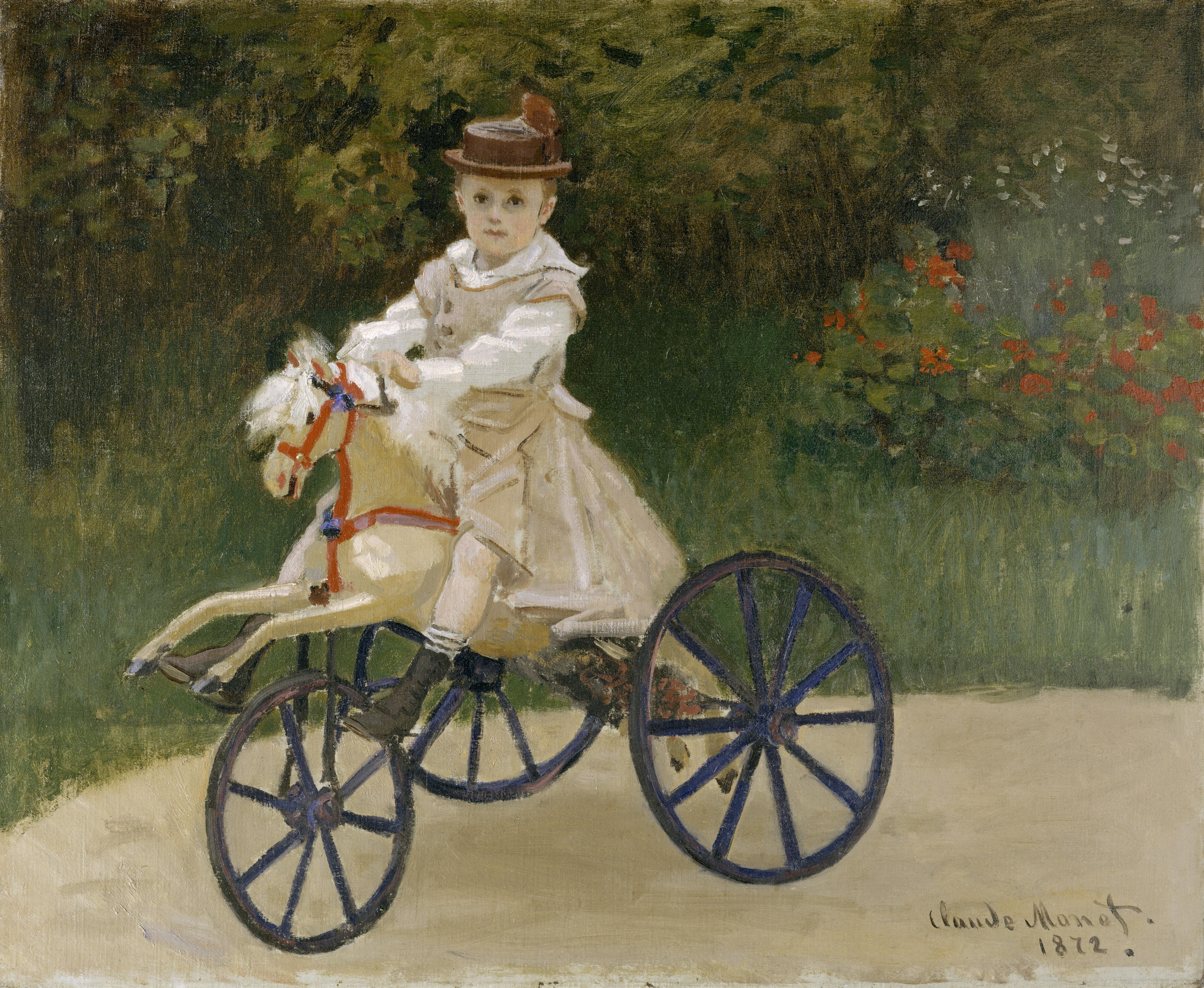
Claude Monet :
Jean Monet on a Rocking Horse
1872

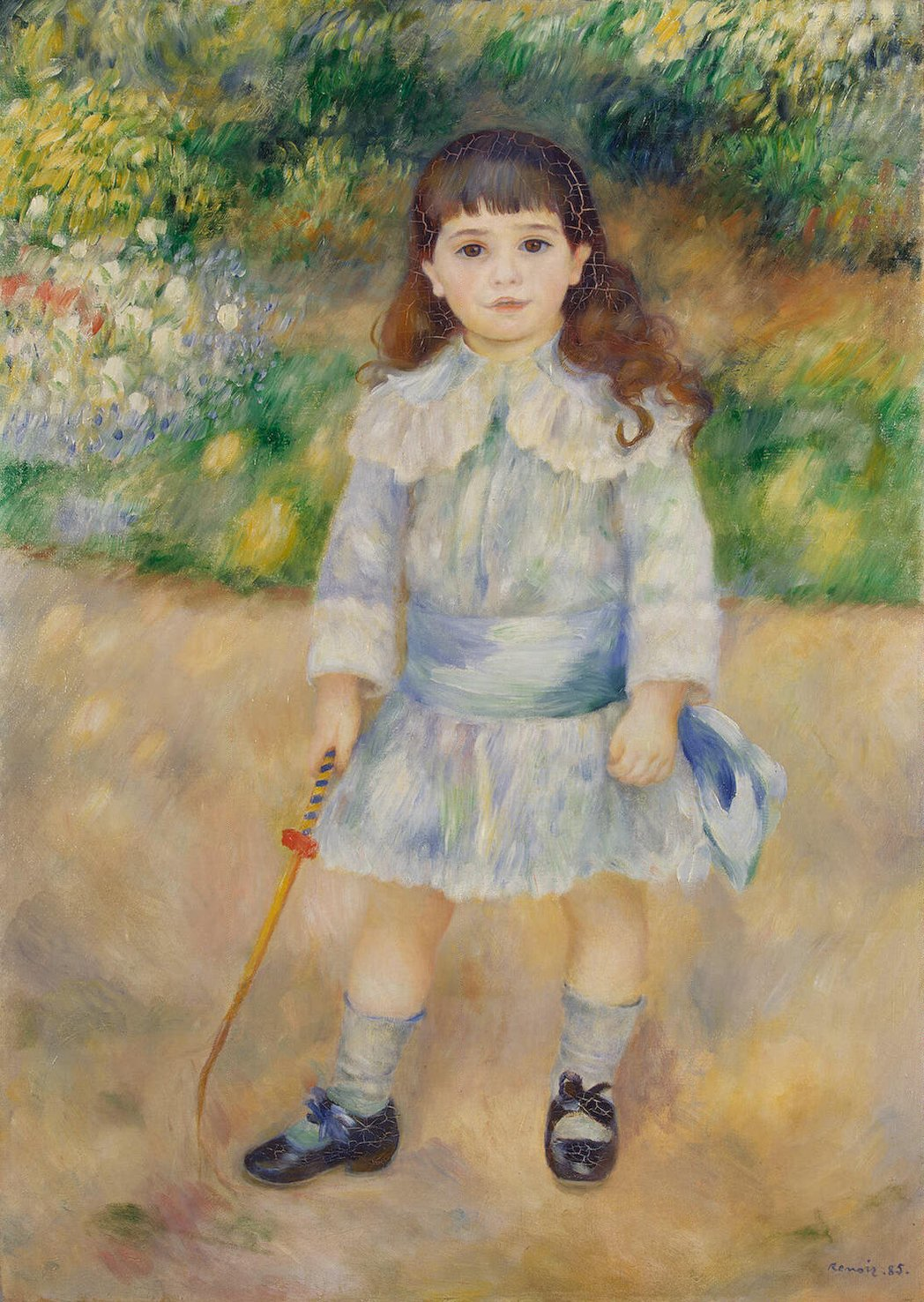
Pierre-Auguste Renoir :
Child with a whip
1885

== Provenance ==
The work was initially owned by the Lange family for a few decades, before being put on sale at the Bernheim-Jeune Gallery in September 1911. Two months later the businessman and Paris resident Alexander von Frey bought the work. In 1913 it was exhibited in Munich at the Galerie moderne Heinrich Thannhauser before being bought by the Leipzig-based industrial magnate Paul von Bleichert. Its next known owner was the Swiss industrialist and art collector Josef Müller (1877–1977) from Soleure. His collection ranged from Pierre-Auguste Renoir to Fernand Léger and was later donated to his town's art gallery. However, this did not include Lange, which Müller had already sold to the New York-based businessman Howard Young, uncle of the actor Elizabeth Taylor. Its next owner was Annie Swan Coburn from Chicago, who lent it to the Art Institute of Chicago for a number of years. On 2 March 1944 the New York businessman Ralph C. Colin bought it at an auction organised by the Parke-Bernet auction house. In 1962 it arrived in the Staatlichen Kunsthalle Karlsruhe thanks to the Düsseldorf art dealer Wilhelm Grosshenning, who had bought it using money from the Wettmittelfonds, a fund set up from the profits from the Staatliche Toto-Lotto Gesellschaft, the state lottery of Bade-Wurtemberg – about a quarter of that fund is used on artistic and cultural projects and purchases

== See also ==
- List of paintings by Édouard Manet
- 1861 in art

== Bibliography ==
- Gary Tinterow, Geneviève Lacambre : Manet/Velázquez: The French Taste for Spanish Painting, exhibition catalogue, Metropolitan Museum of Art, New York, 2003 ISBN 1-58839-038-1.
- (in German) Jan Lauts : Französische Meister aus der Staatlichen Kunsthalle Karlsruhe, Staatliche Kunsthalle Karlsruhe, Karlsruhe 1963.
- (in German) Jan Lauts in Jahrbuch der Staatlichen Kunstsammlungen in Baden-Württemberg, tome I, Deutscher Kunstverlag, Munich/Berlin 1964.
- (in Spanish) Manuela B. Mena Marqués : Manet en el Prado, exhibition catalogue, Prado, Madrid 2003, 540 p. ISBN 84-8480-053-9.
- (in German) Gert Reising in Werner Meyer (ed.) : 250 Meisterwerke: 25 Jahre Toto-Lottoerwerbungen für die Kunstmuseen in Baden-Württemberg, Staatsgalerie Stuttgart, Stuttgart 1984.
- (in French) Manet, exhibition catalogue, Réunion des musées nationaux Paris and Metropolitan Museum of Art, New York, 1983 ISBN 2-7118-0230-2.
- (in French) Denis Rouart, Daniel Wildenstein : Edouard Manet: Catalogue raisonné, Bibliothèque des Arts, Paris and Lausanne, 1975.
- (in German) Kirsten Claudia Voigt: Staatliche Kunsthalle Karlsruhe, Deutscher Kunstverlag, Munich/Berlin, 2002, ISBN 3-422-06495-8.
