= Godinton House =

Grade I listed country house in Great Chart with Singleton, Kent, England

Coordinates: 51°09′35″N 0°50′00″E

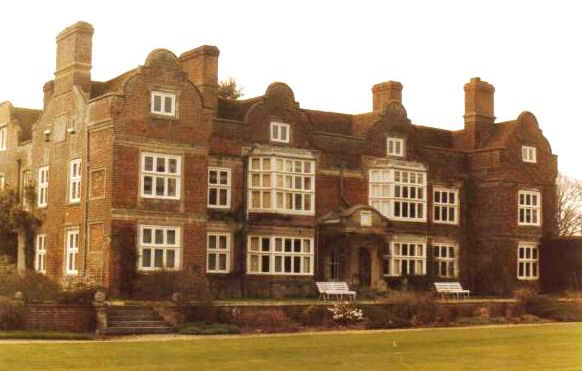
Godinton House circa 1985

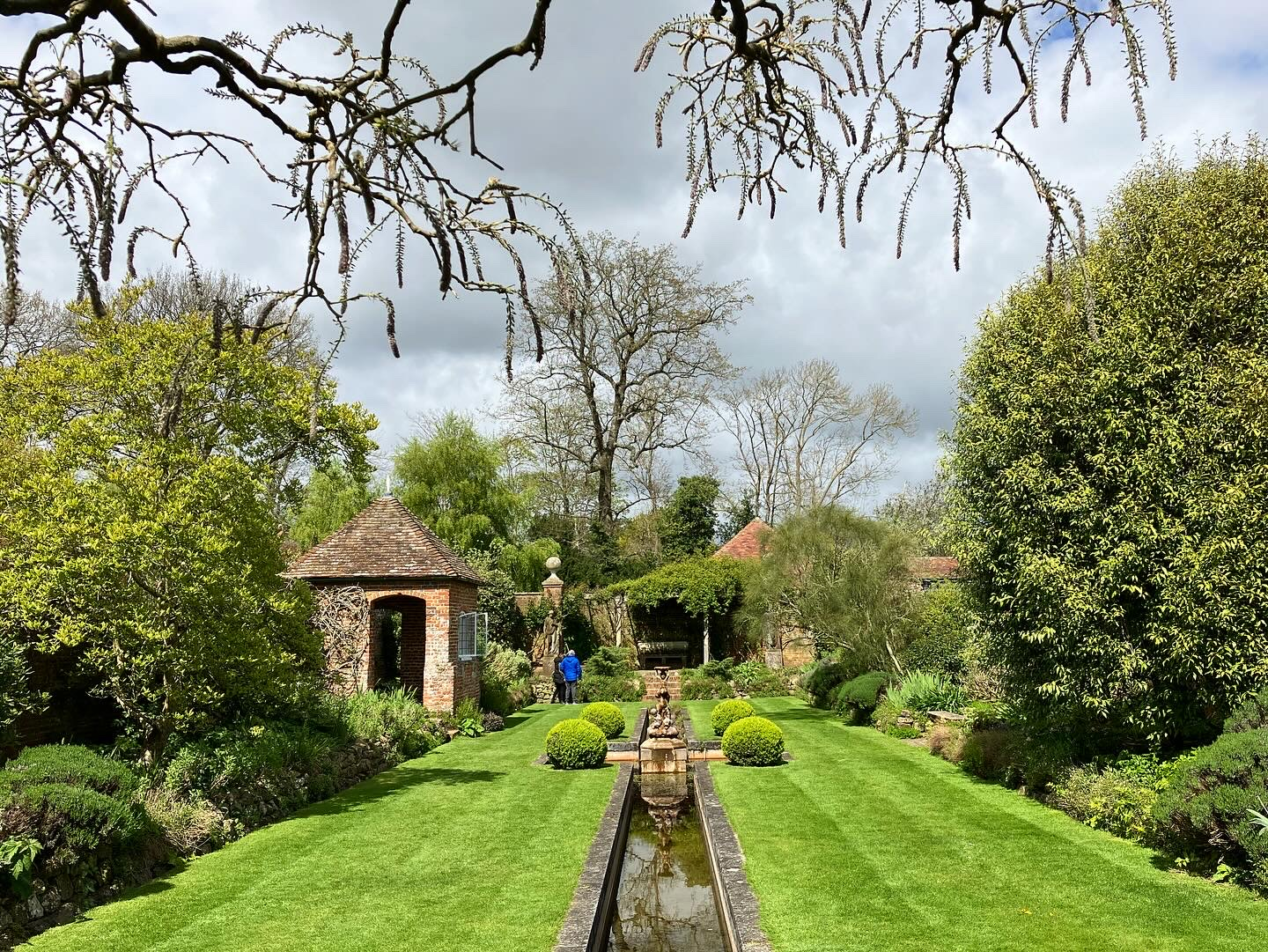
The gardens in April 2024

Godinton House (also known as Godinton House and Gardens or Godinton Park) is a stately home in the parish of Great Chart, owned by a non-profit-making trust. It is 2 miles (3.2 km) north-west of the centre of the town of Ashford, Kent, UK.

== Description ==
Godinton House is an ancient brick house with a Jacobean-style exterior. The roof has a distinctive system of Dutch gables (also called semi-classical gables). The Jacobean house was built around a medieval great hall. Of particular note is the elaborate carvings in chestnut wood on the main staircase.

The gardens include one of the longest Yew hedges in England, as well as having spectacular displays of delphiniums, irises, wild flowers and roses.

The house also has a Steinway piano.

It hosts one of the best private collections of porcelain in the South of England.

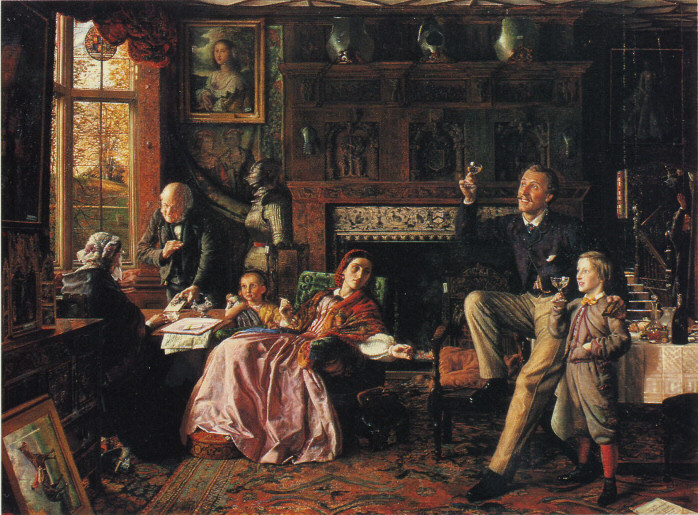
The Last Day in the Old Home by Robert Braithwaite Martineau, a composite of rooms at Godinton

== History ==
Godinton House was the seat of the Toke family for about 455 years from 1440 to 1895.

Around the turn of the century (19th/20th) then owner Mr. Ashley Dodd hired the architect Sir Reginald Blomfield to update the house and redesign the gardens. Blomfield planted the famous yew hedge, shaped to repeat the gable form seen on the house.

In 1991 Major Alan Wyndham-Green, the last owner of Godinton, established the Godinton House Preservation Trust. Since Major Wyndham-Green's passing in 1996 the Trust has continued to preserve, restore, and enhance the house and parklands.
