= The Last Day in the Old Home =

Painting by Robert Braithwaite Martineau

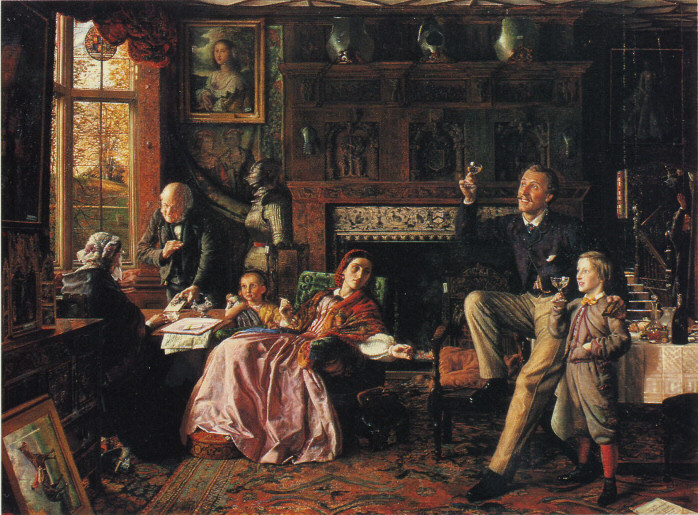
- Artist: Robert Braithwaite Martineau
- Year: 1862
- Medium: Oil on canvas
- Dimensions: 107.3 cm × 144.8 cm (42.2 in × 57.0 in)
- Location: Tate Britain, London

The Last Day in the Old Home is an oil-on-canvas painting made by English painter Robert Braithwaite Martineau, in 1862.

It depicts a moralising scene at the home of a spendthrift country squire. The old furniture and paintings indicate that the fictional Pulleyne family has occupied Hardham Court for centuries, but the equine print in the lower left corner indicates the reason for the family's reduced circumstances: the father has gambled away the family fortune. The paintings and other contents are labelled ready for an auction sale on 22 October 1850, with a Christie's catalogue on the floor in the lower right corner.

Sir Charles Pulleyne, Bt, takes events in his stride, raising a glass of champagne with his young son, but his wife and daughter are more apprehensive. There are advertisements for apartments in the newspaper on the table. The family is reaching the end of its viability: inside, the fire burns low in the grate; outside, the trees show it is the autumn. An older woman - perhaps the grandmother - wipes away her tears as she pays off the butler, who holds the keys to the house.

The interior is based on Godinton House in Ashford, Kent, which was the home of the Toke family from 1440 to 1895. Sir Charles Pulleyne is based on Colonel John Leslie Toke (1839–1911), a friend of Martineau, who inherited the house in 1866 but sold it less than 30 years later.

The painting measures 107.3 centimetres (42.2 in) by 144.8 centimetres (57.0 in). It was exhibited at the British Institution in 1862 and was presented to the Tate Gallery by E.H. Martineau in 1896.
