= The Old Musician =

Painting by Édouard Manet

- Artist: Édouard Manet
- Year: 1862
- Medium: oil on canvas
- Dimensions: 187.4 cm × 248.3 cm (73.8 in × 97.8 in)
- Location: National Gallery of Art, Washington, D.C.
- Accession: 1963.10.162

The Old Musician is an 1862 oil painting on canvas by French painter Édouard Manet, produced during the period when the artist was influenced by Spanish art. The painting also betrays the influence of Gustave Courbet. This work is one of Manet's largest paintings and is now conserved at the National Gallery of Art in Washington, DC.

== Description ==
The painting is composed of seven characters in a landscape. The old musician in the center who is preparing to play the violin is Jean Lagrène, the leader of a local gypsy band. To the left is a young girl standing barefoot with a baby in her arms, as well as two young boys. In the background, the man in the top hat is the rag picker and ironmonger Colardet. At the right, the Oriental man (partly shown) with a turban and a long robe, represents Guéroult, a "wandering Jew". Attitudes and clothes of the characters seem to be inspired by Diego Velázquez or Louis Le Nain.

The painting contains a series of allusions: the man in the top hat is the same character as The Absinthe Drinker, painted by Manet some years earlier and who reappears in this painting without any particular reason. The young boy in straw hat, meanwhile, is explicitly inspired by Antoine Watteau's Pierrot.

== See also ==
- List of paintings by Édouard Manet
- 1862 in art
