= Robert Braithwaite Martineau =

English painter

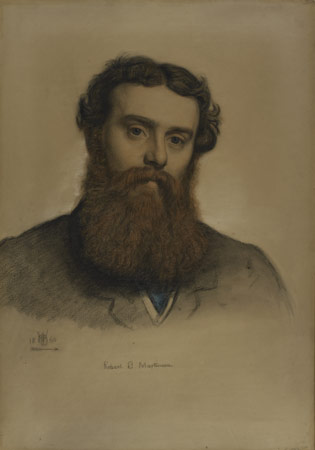
- Drawing of Robert Braithwaite Martineau by William Holman Hunt(1860)
- Born: 19 January 1826; London, England
- Died: 13 February 1869 (aged 43); London, England
- Education: Royal Academy of Art
- Known for: Painting, Drawing
- Notable work: The Last Day in the Old Home
- Movement: Pre-Raphaelite

Robert Braithwaite Martineau (19 January 1826 – 13 February 1869) was an English Victorian painter.

== Life ==
Martineau was the son of Elizabeth Batty and Philip Martineau, a Master in Chancery. Through his mother, he was the grandson of Robert Batty, M.D. (1763–1849), physician and amateur painter.

Martineau attended Colfes school for a few years at the age of 15. He first trained as a lawyer and later entered the Royal Academy where he was awarded a silver medal. He studied under the Pre-Raphaelite artist William Holman Hunt and once shared a studio with him. He died at the age of 43. In 1865, he married Maria Wheeler and had two children with her.

His most famous painting, The Last Day in the Old Home, portrays the household of a feckless squire after gambling away his family's inheritance. The man portrayed is Colonel John Leslie Toke (1839–1911) who was a friend of Martineau and was painted at his country home, Godinton House in Ashford, Kent. In an odd way life came to imitate art, for J L Toke inherited the house in 1866 but lost it after four hundred years of the Toke family living there. The painting can be seen at the Tate Gallery in London. Other paintings were bequeathed to the Ashmolean Museum in Oxford and Liverpool Art Gallery by his daughter Helen. Other less well known paintings include Kit's Writing Lesson and Picciola.

Martineau was buried in Kensal Green Cemetery.

== Works ==
- Kit's Writing Lesson, London, Tate, 1852.
- Picciola, London, Tate, 1853.
- Katherine and Petruchio, Oxford, Ashmolean Museum, 1855.
- The Spelling Lesson, Paris, Musée d'Orsay, circa 1856.
- The Last Chapter, Birmingham Museums Trust, 1860–1863.
- A Lady with a Gold Chain and Earrings, Manchester Art Gallery, 1861.
- Christians and Christians, Liverpool, Walker Art Gallery, 1868–1869.

== Gallery ==
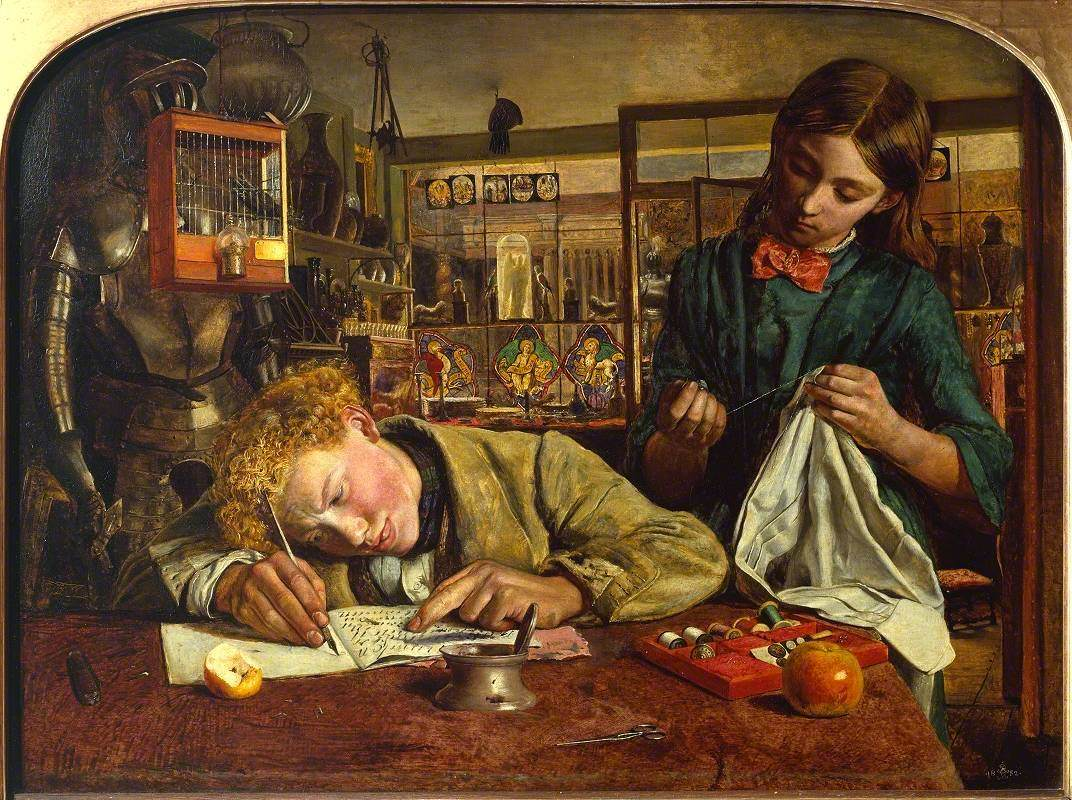
Kit's Writing Lesson, 1852

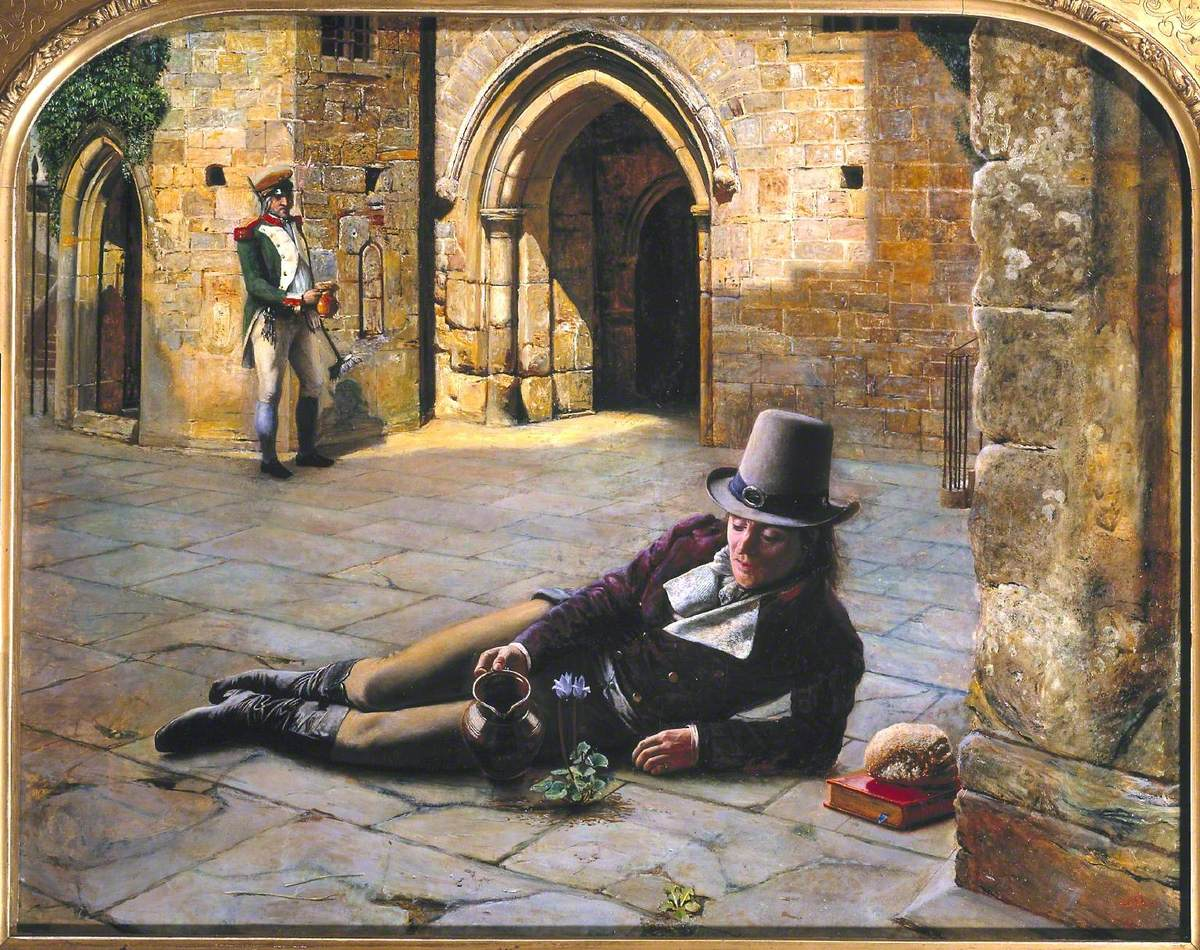
Picciola, 1853

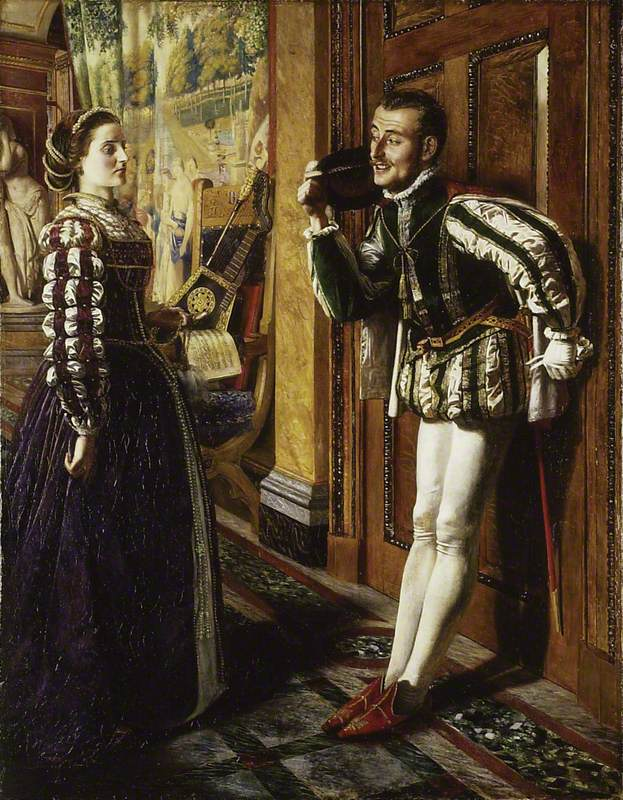
Katherine and Petruchio, 1855

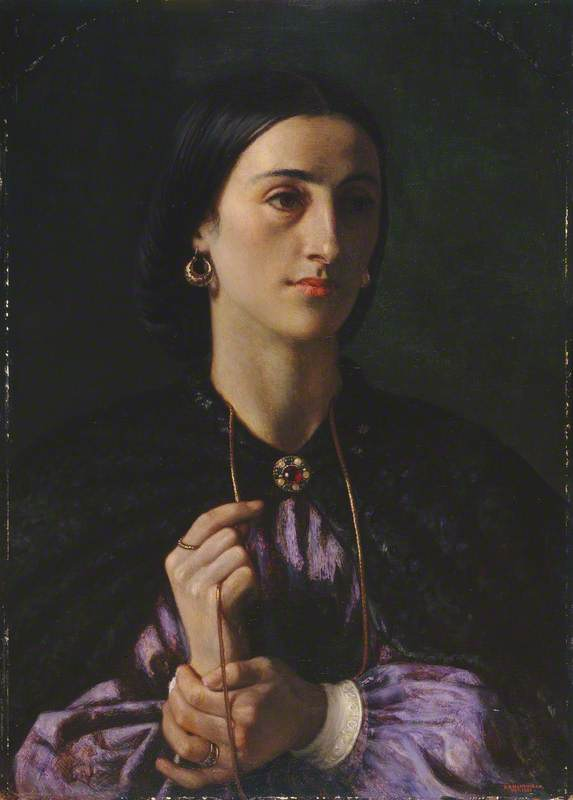
A Lady with a Gold Chain and Earrings, 1861

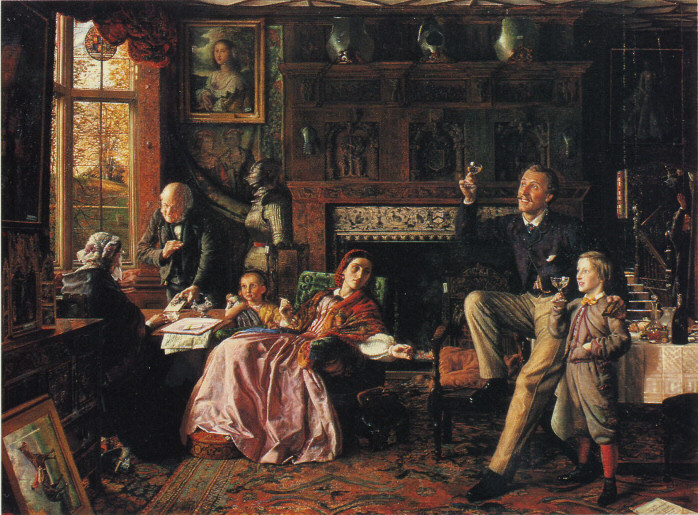
The Last Day in the Old Home, 1862

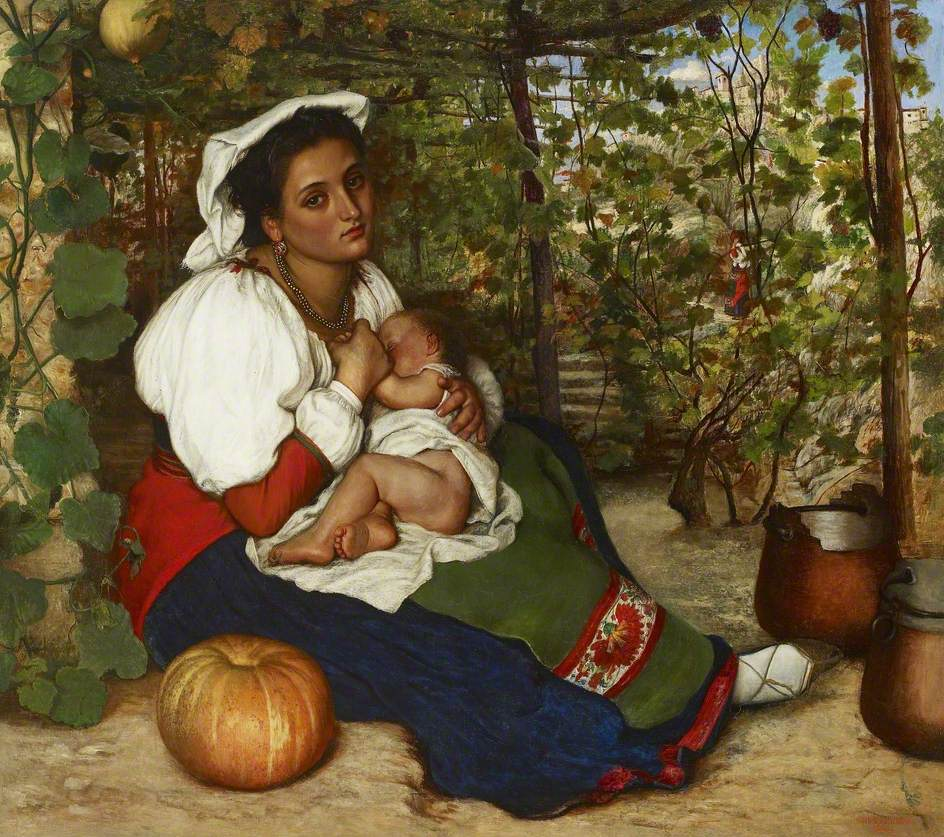
A Woman of San Germano, 1864

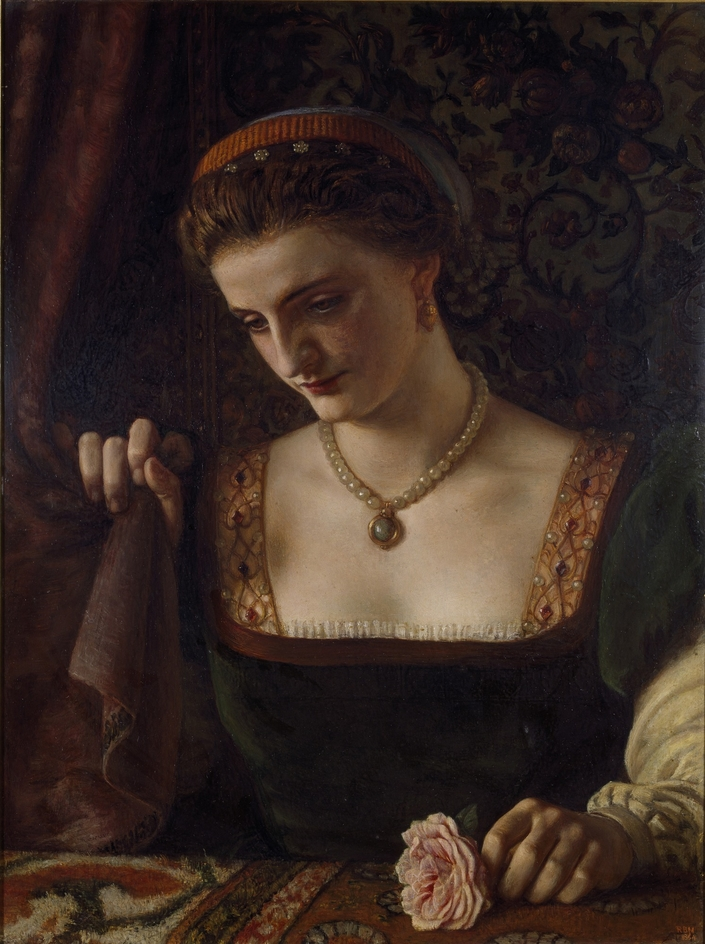
The Knight's Guerdon, 1864

== Bibliography ==
- Christoph Newall, La Leçon d'orthographe, La Revue du Musée d'Orsay, n° 21 autommne 2005, pp. 20–25.
