= 1859 in art =

Events from the year 1859 in art.

== Events ==
- March 22 – Scottish National Gallery opens to the public in Edinburgh in neoclassical premises designed by W. H. Playfair.
- April 26 – William Morris marries his model, Jane Burden. Edward Burne-Jones presents them with a self-painted wardrobe.
- May 2 – The Royal Academy Exhibition of 1859 opens in London.
- The Neue Pinakothek is completed in Munich, intended to be the first museum in Europe for the exhibition of contemporary painting.
- Frederic E. Church's The Heart of the Andes is exhibited in New York and draws 12,000 paying visitors.
- While attending the free school, the Académie Suisse, in Paris, Pissarro becomes friends with a number of younger artists also choosing to paint in a more realistic style, including Monet, Guillaumin and Cézanne.
- Photography is admitted to the Paris Salon for the first time.
- The Artists Rifles set up in London as a volunteer unit of the British Army.

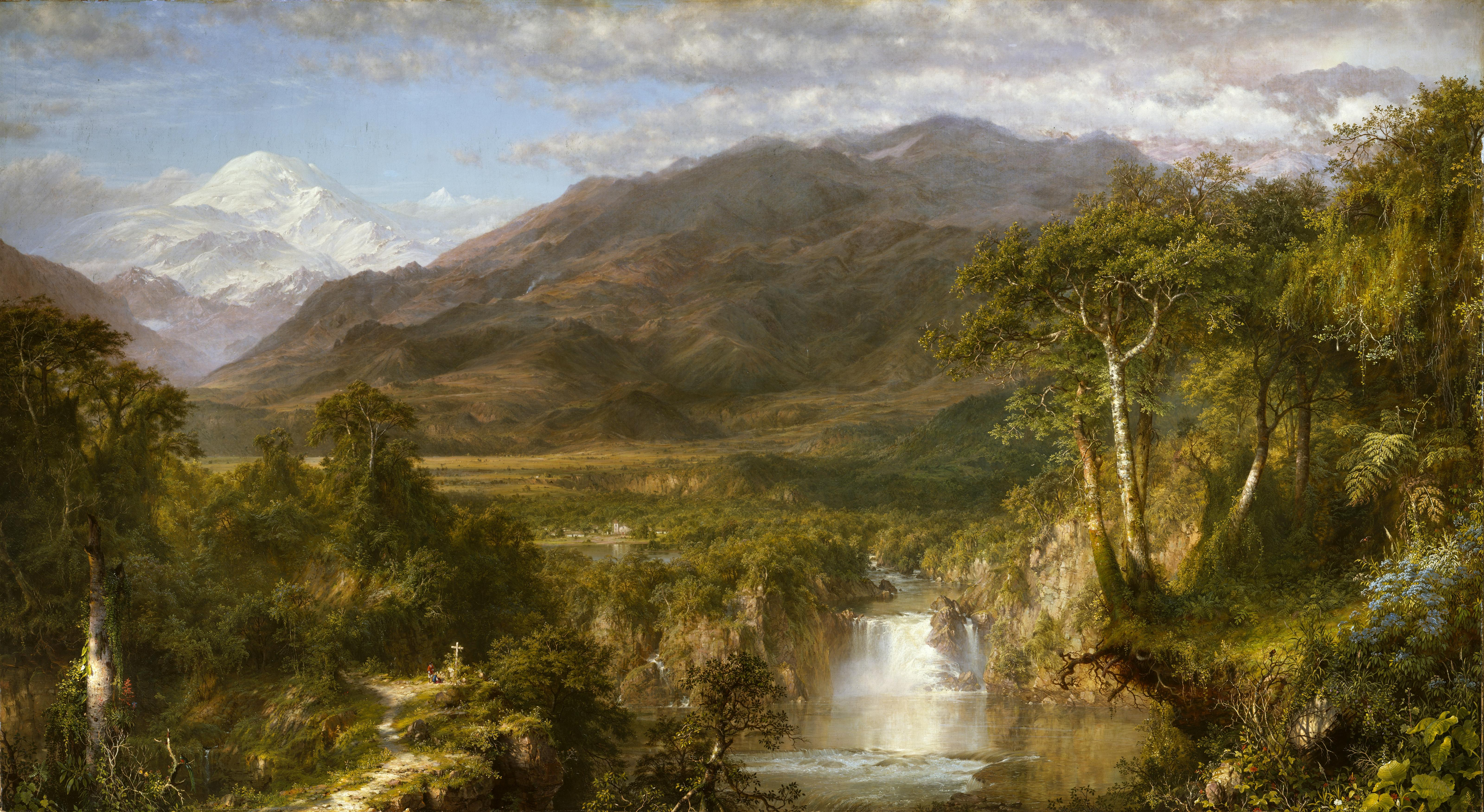
Frederic E. Church – The Heart of the Andes

== Works ==
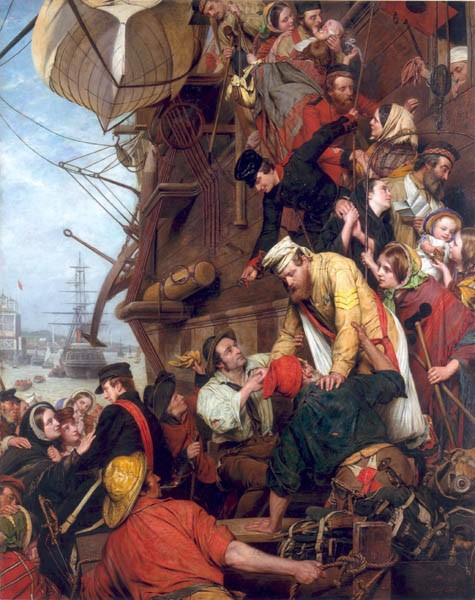
Home Again by Henry Nelson O'Neil.

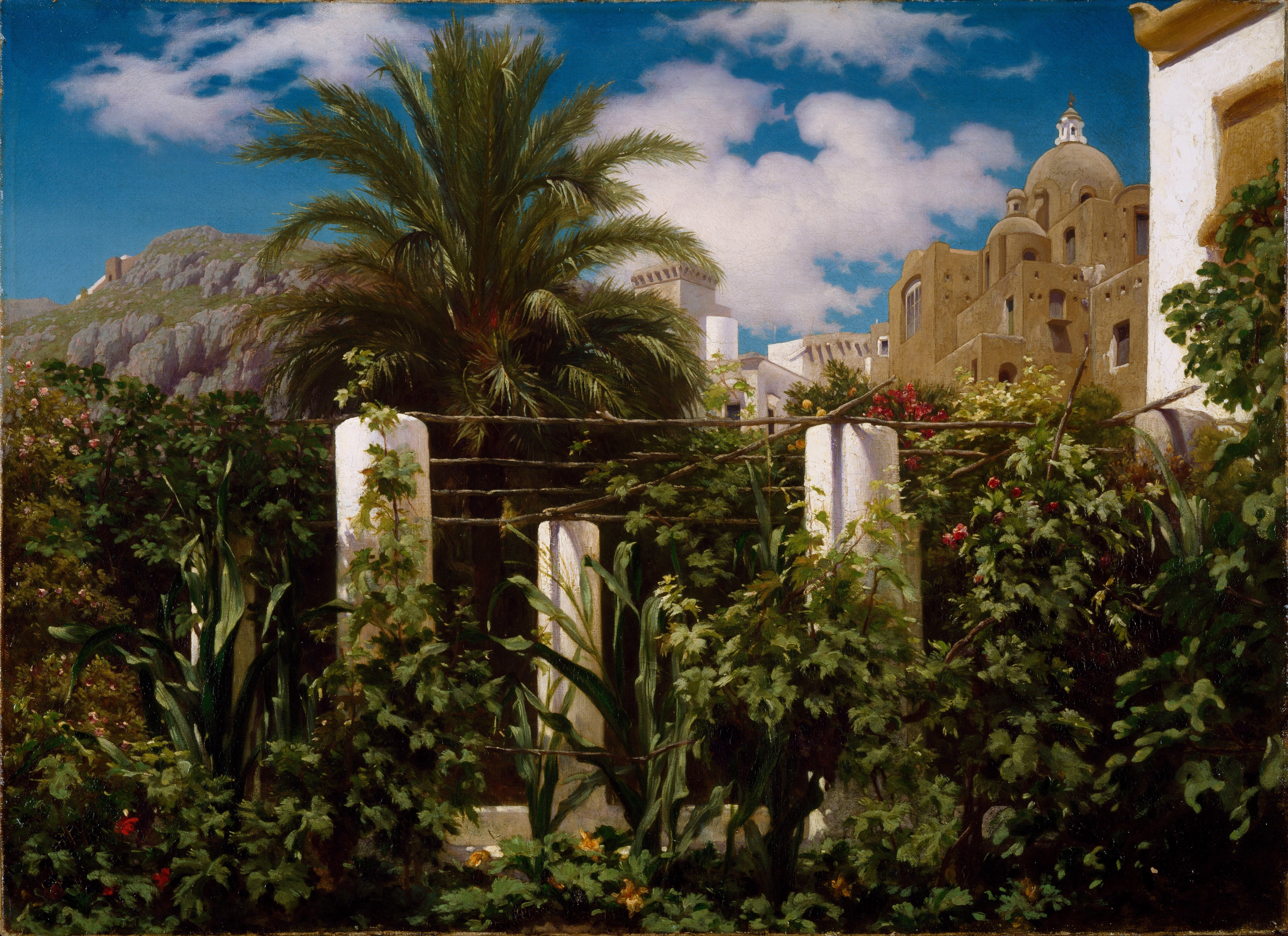
Garden of an Inn, Capri by Frederic Leighton

- Peter Nicolai Arbo – Saint Olav at the Battle of Stiklestad
- Thomas Jones Barker – The Relief of Lucknow
- Albert Bierstadt – some dates approximate
  - Bernese Alps
  - Surveyor's Wagon in the Rockies
  - The Wolf River, Kansas
- Frederick Lee Bridell – The Coliseum at Rome by Moonlight
- Philip Hermogenes Calderon – French Peasants Finding Their Stolen Child
- Frederic E. Church – The Heart of the Andes
- Peter Clodt von Jürgensburg – Monument to Nicholas I (Saint Petersburg), the world's largest equestrian statue supported only by the hind hooves of a rearing horse
- Thomas Couture – Daydreams
- Eugène Delacroix – Ovid among the Scythians (first version)
- Robert S. Duncanson – Landscape with Rainbow
- William Dyce – Beatrice (Lady with a Coronet of Jasmine)
- Augustus Egg – The Night Before Naseby
- William Maw Egley – Omnibus Life in London
- Henri Fantin-Latour – Self-portrait
- Jean-Léon Gérôme – The Draught Players
- Francesco Hayez – The Kiss, an expression of Italian Romanticism
- George Elgar Hicks – Dividend Day at the Bank of England
- James Clarke Hook
  - The Brook
  - Luff, Boy!
- Arthur Hughes – The Long Engagement
- Charles-Auguste Lebourg – Gallic Victim (marble)
- Frederic Leighton – Garden of an Inn, Capri
- Jean-Léon Gérôme – King Candaules
- Édouard Manet – The Absinthe Drinker (Ny Carlsberg Glyptotek, Copenhagen)
- John Everett Millais – The Vale of Rest
- Jean-François Millet – The Angelus (completed version) (Musée d'Orsay, Paris)
- Elisabet Ney – Arthur Schopenhauer (sculpture)
- Henry Nelson O'Neil – Home Again
- David Roberts – Ruins of the Roman Forum
- Dante Gabriel Rossetti – Bocca Baciata, the first of his portraits of single female figures (Fanny Cornforth)
- John Roddam Spencer Stanhope – Thoughts of the Past
- James McNeill Whistler – Brown and Silver: Old Battersea Bridge
- Franz Xaver Winterhalter – Portrait of Prince Albert
- Adolphe Yvon – The Malakoff Gorge

== Births ==
- January 28 – Ambrosia Tønnesen, Norwegian sculptor (died 1948)
- May 25 – William Logsdail, English landscape, portrait, and genre painter (died 1944)
- June 16 – Paja Jovanović, one of the leading three Serbian Realist painters, with Đorđe Krstić and Uroš Predić (died 1957)
- June 17 – Walter Osborne, Irish Impressionist painter (died 1903)
- August 22 – John Henry Dearle, English textile designer (died 1932)
- October 17 – Childe Hassam, American Impressionist painter (died 1935)
- November 10 – Théophile Steinlen, Swiss/French painter (died 1923)
- November 27 – William Bliss Baker, American landscape painter (died 1886)
- December 2 – Georges-Pierre Seurat, French post-Impressionist painter (died 1891)
- December 25 – Anna Palm de Rosa, Swedish-born painter (died 1924)
- December 30 – Henrietta Rae, English painter (died 1928)

== Deaths ==
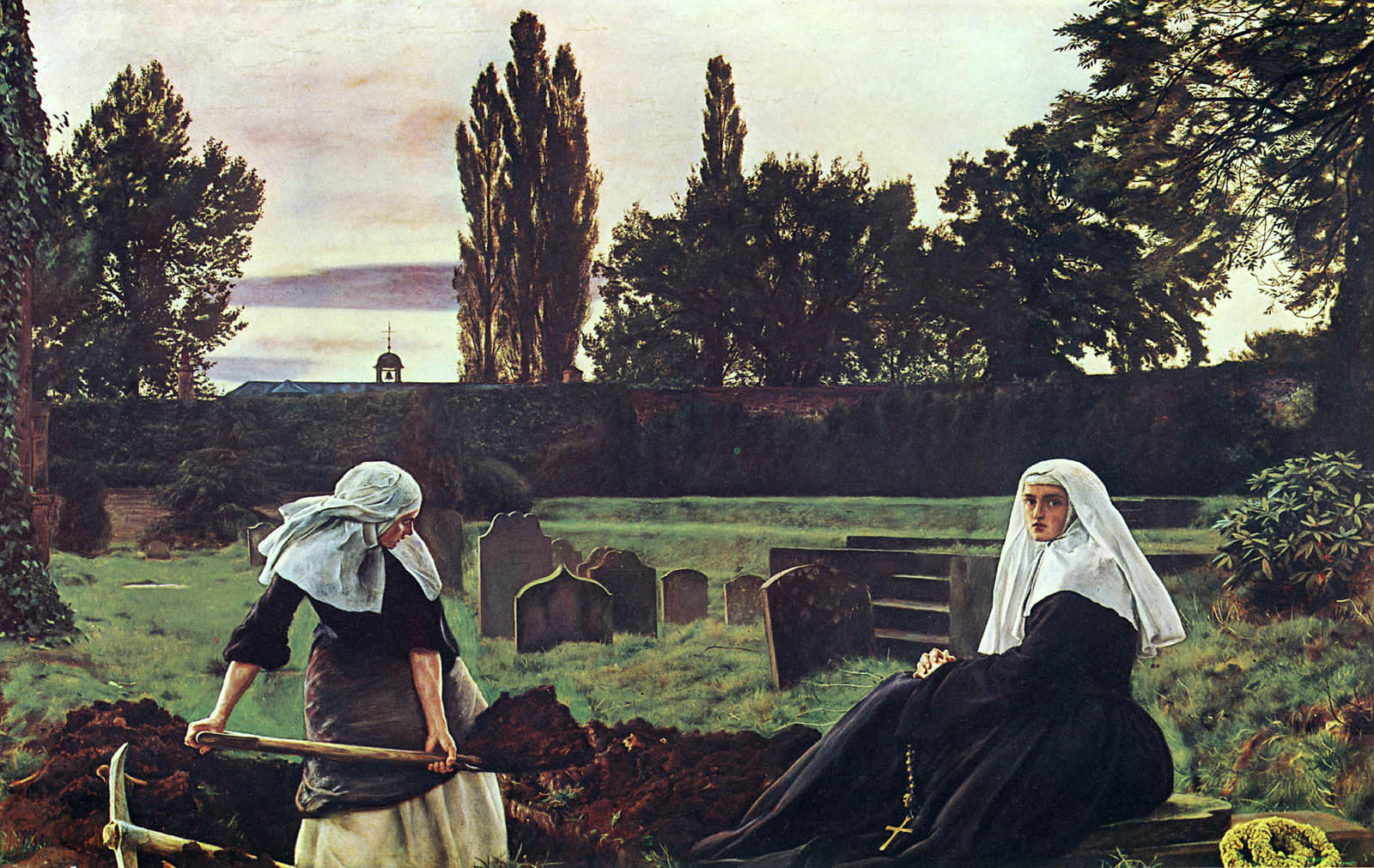
Millais – The Vale of Rest

- February 8 – William Edward West, American portrait painter (born 1788)
- March 3 – Cornelis Cels, Belgian painter of portraits and historical subjects (born 1778)
- March 24 – James Stark, English painter (born 1794)
- April 22 – Edward Villiers Rippingille, English painter (born c.1790)
- May 5 – Charles Robert Leslie, English genre works painter (born 1794)
- May 8 – José de Madrazo y Agudo, Spanish Neoclassicist painter (born 1781)
- June 7 – David Cox, English landscape painter (born 1783)
- June 20 – Hans Michelsen, Norwegian sculptor (born 1789)
- August 3 – Alexey Tyranov, Russian painter (born 1801)
- August 27 – Catharine Hermine Kølle, Norwegian adventurer and painter (born 1788)
- October 21 – William Jennys, American naïve art portrait painter (born 1774)
- November 13 - Ernesta Legnani Bisi, Italian painter and engraver (born 1788)
- November 17 – James Ward, English animal painter and engraver (born 1769)
- December 17 – Jan Feliks Piwarski, Polish painter and professor of art (born 1794)
- date unknown – John Bacon, English sculptor (born 1777)
