= Emigration =

Act of leaving one's country to another

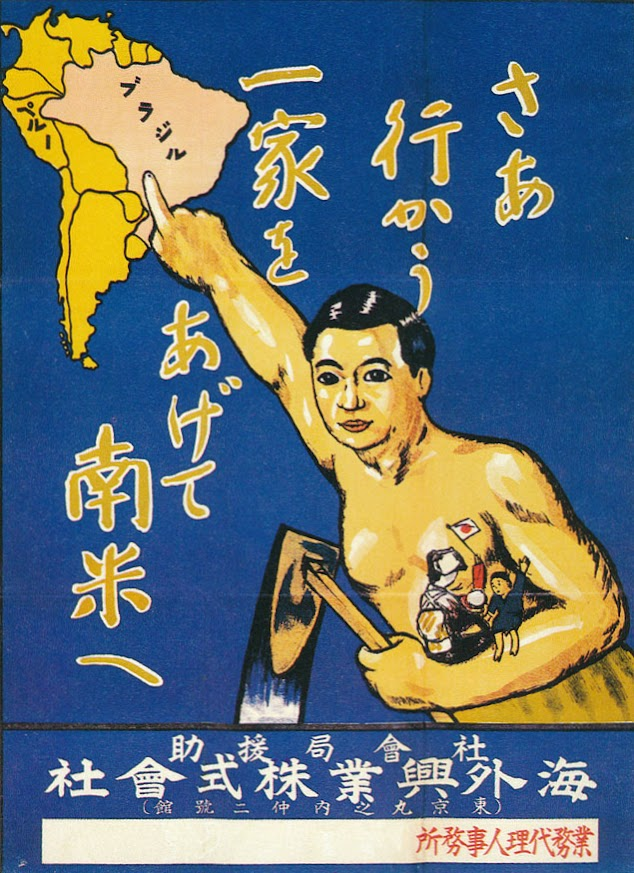
Japanese government poster in the early 20th century promoting emigration to South America, with Brazil highlighted

Emigration is the act of leaving a resident country or place of residence with the intent to settle elsewhere (to permanently leave a country). Conversely, immigration describes the movement of people into one country from another (to permanently move to a country). A migrant emigrates from their old country, and immigrates to their new country. Thus, both emigration and immigration describe migration, but from different countries' perspectives.

Demographers examine push and pull factors for people to be pushed out of one place and attracted to another. There can be a desire to escape negative circumstances such as shortages of land or jobs, or unfair treatment. People can be pulled to the opportunities available elsewhere. Fleeing from oppressive conditions, being a refugee and seeking asylum to get refugee status in a foreign country, may lead to permanent emigration.

Forced displacement refers to groups that are forced to abandon their native country, such as by enforced population transfer or the threat of ethnic cleansing. Refugees and asylum seekers in this sense are the most marginalized extreme cases of migration, facing multiple hurdles in their journey and efforts to integrate into the new settings. Scholars in this sense have called for cross-sector engagement from businesses, non-governmental organizations, educational institutions, and other stakeholders within the receiving communities.

== History ==
Patterns of emigration have been shaped by numerous economic, social, and political changes throughout the world in the last few hundred years. For instance, millions of individuals fled poverty, violence, and political turmoil in Europe to settle in the Americas and Oceania during the 18th, 19th, and 20th centuries. Likewise, millions left South China in the Chinese diaspora during the 19th and early 20th centuries.

Poster showing a cross-section of the Cunard Line's emigrant liner RMS Aquitania, launched in 1913.

== "Push" and "pull" factors ==
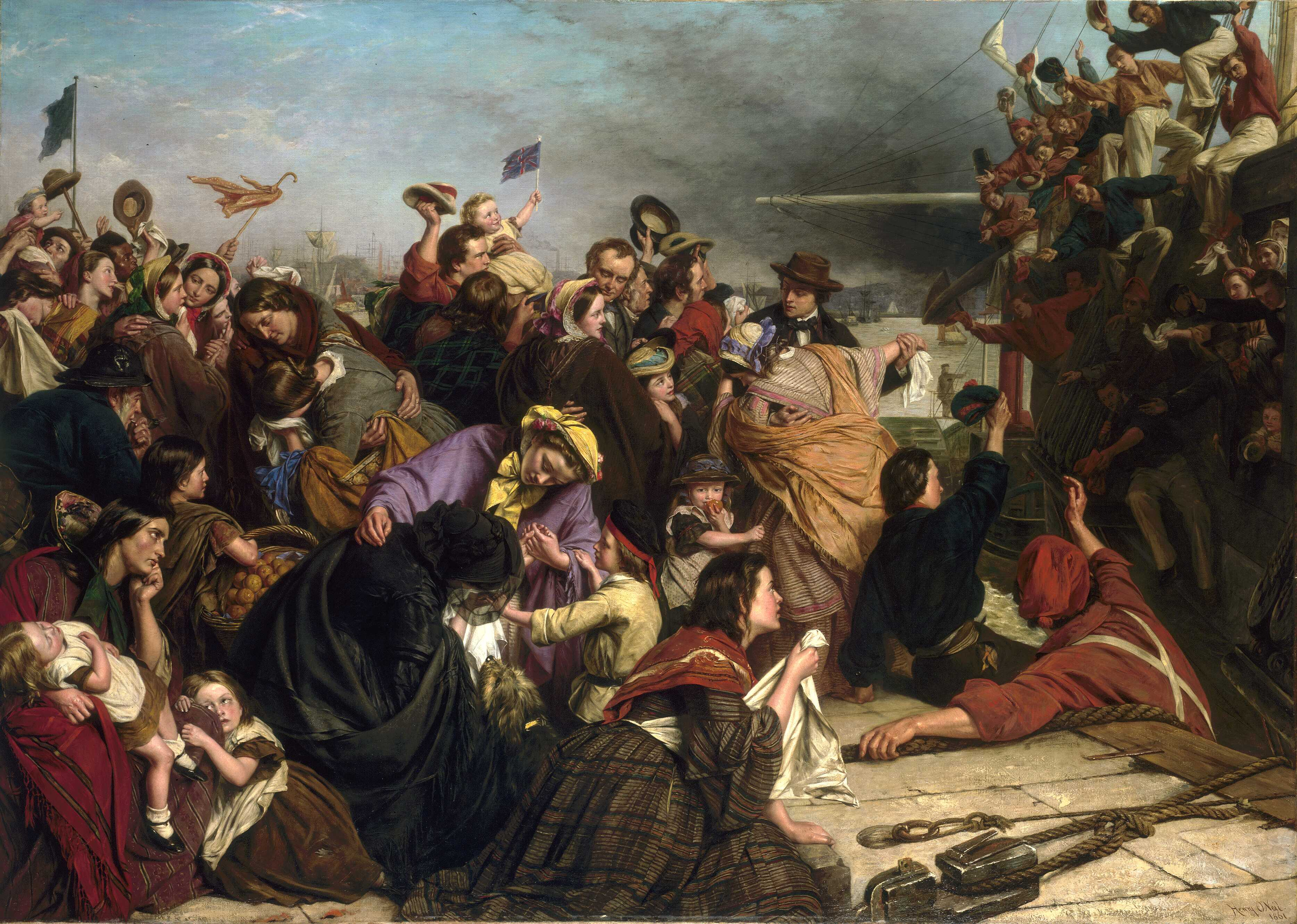
The Parting Cheer by Henry Nelson O'Neil, 1861

Demographers distinguish factors at the origin that push people out, versus those at the destination that pull them in. Motives to migrate can be either incentives attracting people away, known as pull factors, or circumstances encouraging a person to leave. Diversity of push and pull factors inform management scholarship in their efforts to understand migrant movement.

=== Push factors ===
- Poor living conditions or overcrowding
- Lack of employment or entrepreneurial opportunities
- Lack of educational opportunities
- Threat of arrest or punishment
- Persecution or intolerance based on race, religion, gender or sexual orientation
- Political corruption, lack of government transparency or freedom of speech
- Inability to find a spouse for marriage
- Lack of freedom to choose religion, or to choose no religion
- Resource depletion, scarcity or austerity
- Military draft, warfare or terrorism
- Expulsion by armed force or coercion
- Recession or economic collapse
- Famine or drought
- Cultural fights with other cultural groups

=== Pull factors ===
- Higher quality of life, economic growth or lower cost of living
- Encouragement to join relatives or fellow countrymen; chain migration
- Quick wealth (as in a gold rush)
- More job opportunities or promise of higher pay
- Prosperity or economic surplus
- Educational opportunity (including university for adults or K-12 for children)
- Prepaid travel (as from relatives)
- Building a new nation (historically)
- Building specific cultural or religious communities
- Political freedom
- Cultural opportunities
- Greater opportunity to find a spouse
- Favorable climate
- Ease of crossing boundaries
- Reduced tariff
- The search for a spouse or romantic partner

=== Criticism ===
Some scholars criticize the "push-pull" approach to understanding international migration. Regarding lists of positive or negative factors about a place, Jose C. Moya writes "one could easily compile similar lists for periods and places where no migration took place."

== Emigration waves by country ==
Search for "Emigration from" in titles

- Jews escaping from German-occupied Europe
- Yerida (Jewish emigration from Israel)
- Swedish emigration to the United States

== Statistics ==
Net migration rates per 1,000 people (2023, Population Reference Bureau)

Unlike immigration, in many countries few if any records have been recorded (Note: Americans may register to vote in US elections and pay taxes while living abroad.) or maintained in regard to persons leaving a country either on a temporary or permanent basis. Therefore, estimates on emigration must be derived from secondary sources such as immigration records of the receiving country or records from other administrative agencies.

The rate of emigration has continued to grow, reaching 280 million in 2017.

In Armenia, for example, the migration is calculated by counting people arriving or leaving the country via airplane, train, railway or other means of transportation. Here, the emigration index is high: 1.5% of population leaves the country annually. In fact, it is one of the countries, where emigration has become a part of culture since 20th century. For example, between 1990 and 2005 approximately 700,000–1,300,000 Armenians left the country. The highly rising numbers of emigration are a direct response to socio-political and economic areas of the country. The internal migration (migration in country) is big (28.7%), while international migration is 71.3% of the total migration by people aging 15 and above. It is important to understand the reasons for both types of migration and the availability of the options. For example, in Armenia, everything is localized in the capital city Yerevan, thus, internal migration is from the villages and small cities to the biggest city of the country. The reason for the migration can be work or study. International migration follows the same reasoning of migration: work or study. The main destinations for it are Russia, France and US.

== Emigration restrictions ==
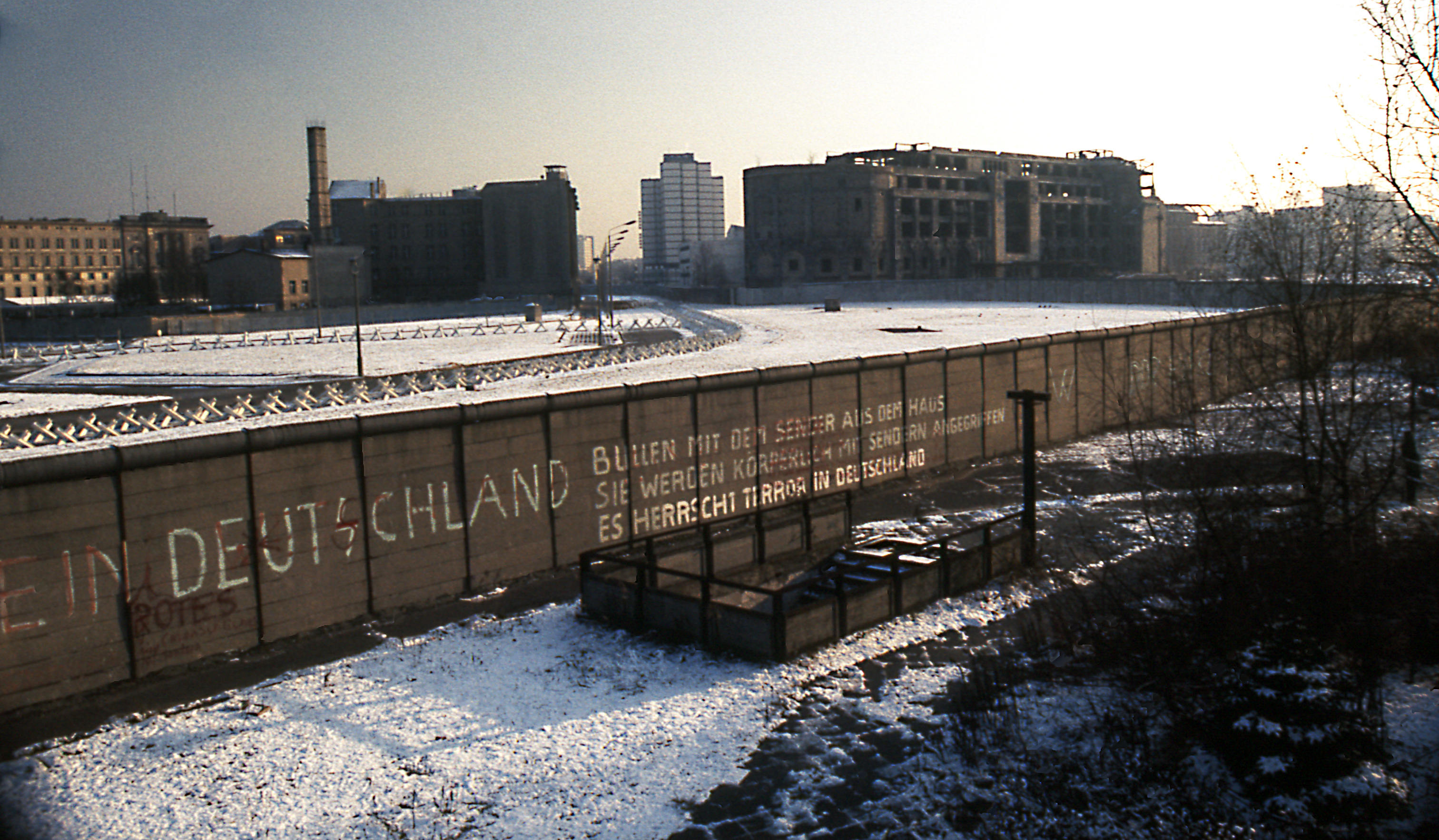
East Germany erected the Berlin Wall to prevent emigration westward.

Some countries restrict the ability of their citizens to emigrate to other countries. After 1668, the Qing Emperor banned Han Chinese migration to Manchuria. In 1681, the emperor ordered construction of the Willow Palisade, a barrier beyond which the Chinese were prohibited from encroaching on Manchu and Mongol lands.

The Soviet Russia then later Soviet Union began such restrictions in 1918, with laws and borders tightening until even illegal emigration was nearly impossible by 1928. To strengthen this, they set up internal passport controls and individual city Propiska ("place of residence") permits, along with internal freedom of movement restrictions often called the 101st kilometre, rules which greatly restricted mobility within even small areas.

At the end of World War II in 1945, the Soviet Union occupied several Central European countries, together called the Eastern Bloc, with the majority of those living in the newly acquired areas aspiring to independence and wanted the Soviets to leave. Before 1950, over 15 million people emigrated from the Soviet-occupied eastern European countries and immigrated into the west in the five years immediately following World War II. By the early 1950s, the Soviet approach to controlling national movement was emulated by most of the rest of the Eastern Bloc. Restrictions implemented in the Eastern Bloc stopped most east–west migration, with only 13.3 million migrations westward between 1950 and 1990. However, hundreds of thousands of East Germans annually immigrated to West Germany through a "loophole" in the system that existed between East and West Berlin, where the four occupying World War II powers governed movement. The emigration resulted in massive "brain drain" from East Germany to West Germany of younger educated professionals, such that nearly 20% of East Germany's population had migrated to West Germany by 1961. In 1961, East Germany erected a barbed-wire barrier that would eventually be expanded through construction into the Berlin Wall, effectively closing the loophole. In 1989, the Berlin Wall fell, followed by German reunification and within two years the dissolution of the Soviet Union.

By the early 1950s, the Soviet approach to controlling international movement was also emulated by China, Mongolia, and North Korea. North Korea still tightly restricts emigration, and maintains one of the strictest emigration bans in the world, although some North Koreans still manage to illegally emigrate to China. Other countries with tight emigration restrictions at one time or another included Angola, Egypt, Ethiopia, Mozambique, Somalia, Afghanistan, Burma, Democratic Kampuchea (Cambodia from 1975 to 1979), Laos, North Vietnam, Iraq, South Yemen and Cuba.

Following the February 2022 Russian invasion of Ukraine, the Ukrainian government introduced martial law restricting men aged 18 to 60 from leaving the country, a measure later narrowed to ages 23 to 60, which prompted more than 30,000 Ukrainian men to illegally enter Romania to evade frontline conscription.

== See also ==
- Canvas ceiling
- Deportation
- Diaspora
- Eastern Bloc emigration and defection
- Émigré
- Exile
- Expatriate
- Feminization of migration
- Immigration
- Foot voting
- Human capital flight
- Human migration
- Settlement
- International Organization for Migration
- Migration Letters
- Political asylum
- Political migration
- Population transfer
- Refugee
- RMS Mooltan
- Separation barrier
- Snowbird (people)
- Xenophobia
