= The Parting Cheer =

Painting by Henry Nelson O'Neil

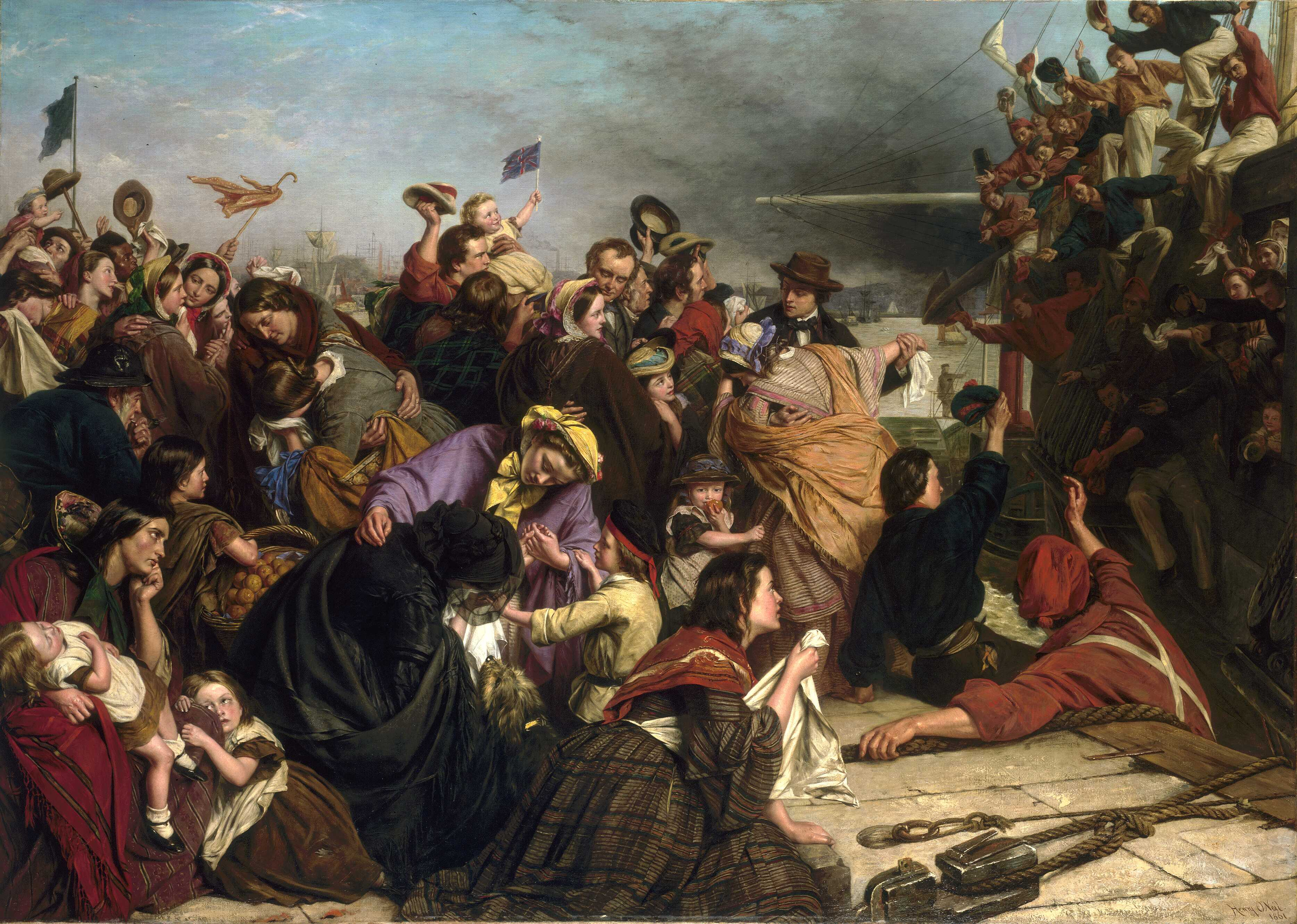
- Artist: Henry Nelson O'Neil
- Year: 1861
- Type: Oil on canvas, genre painting
- Dimensions: 132 cm × 186 cm (52 in × 73 in)
- Location: National Maritime Museum, London

The Parting Cheer is an 1861 genre painting by the British artist Henry Nelson O'Neil. It depicts a group of emigrants leaving Britain, likely for the British Empire. The scene is on the River Thames as a departing ship pulls away from the dock. The sailors and other on the deck and rigging wave to their friends and relatives on the shore. Unlike the mournful displays of emigration in some paintings of the Victorian era, this is broadly more upbeat portrayal. However, the expressions of the steerage passengers down below are more ambiguous.

It was the only work that O'Neil submitted for display at the Royal Academy Exhibition of 1861 at the National Gallery. Today the painting is in the collection of the National Maritime Museum in Greenwich.

== Bibliography ==
- Brown, Kevin. Passage to the World: The Emigrant Experience, 1807–1940. Pen and Sword, 2013.
- Fletcher, Pamela. The Victorian Painting of Modern Life. Taylor & Francis, 2024.
- Mahoney, Claire O. Brunel and the Art of Invention. Samson and Company, 2007.
