= Royal Academy Exhibition of 1861 =

1861 art exhibition in London

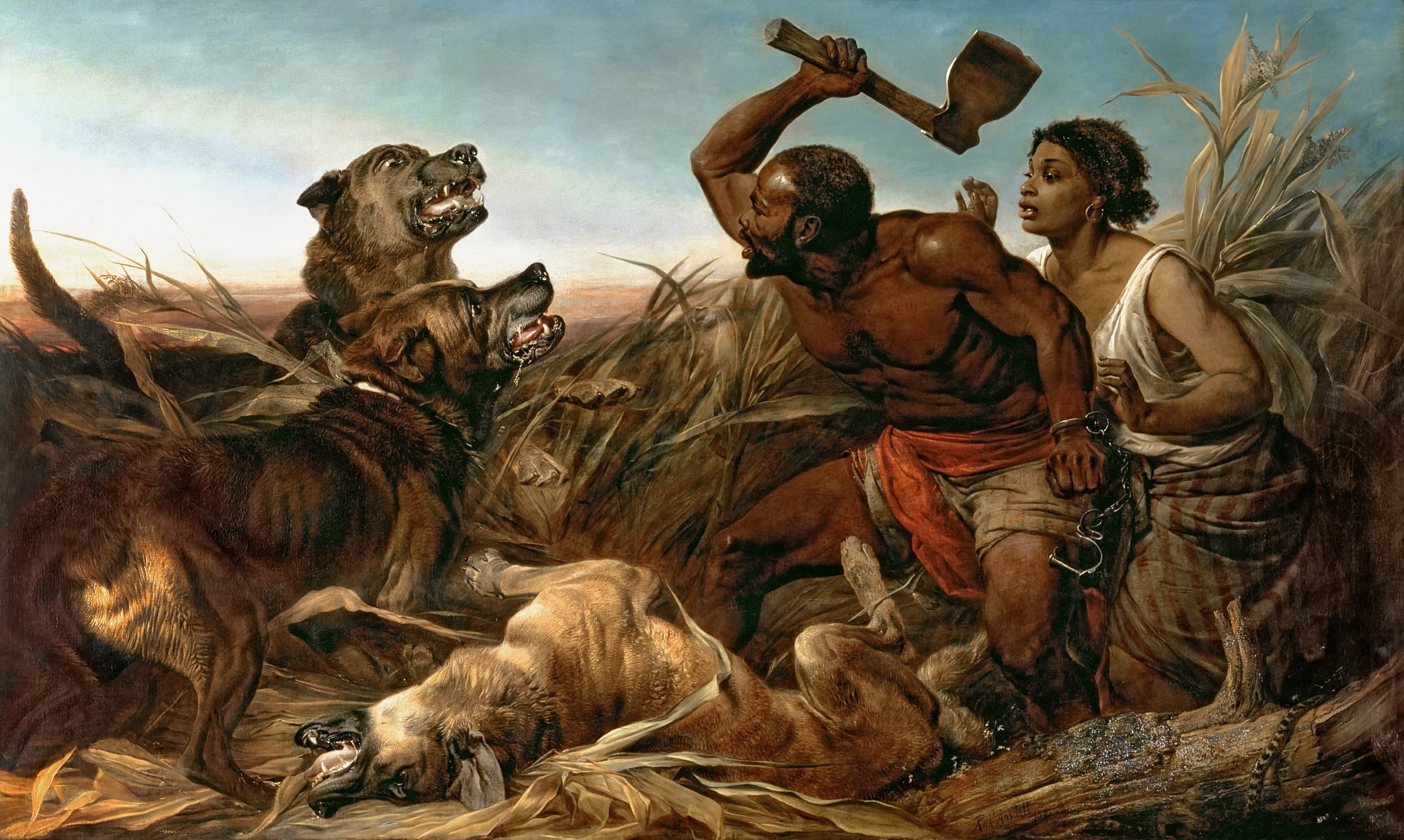
The Hunted Slaves by Richard Ansdell

The Royal Academy Exhibition of 1861 was the ninety third annual Summer Exhibition of the British Royal Academy of Arts. It was held at the National Gallery in London between 6 May and 27 July 1861. It featured submissions from many of the leading artists and architects of the Victorian era. It was noted for the absence of several senior painters, including the Royal Academicians John Everett Millais, Daniel Maclise and William Powell Frith who did not submit works. Rising younger artists Frederic Leighton, Thomas Faed and Frederick Goodall made a significant impact.

The exhibition was held shortly after the Battle of Fort Sumter in South Carolina that began the American Civil War. A number of the paintings on display featured pro-Abolitionism themes depicting the cruelty of slavery in the United States. Notable amongst these was Richard Ansdell's The Hunted Slaves and Slaves Waiting for the Sale by Eyre Crowe.

Henry Nelson O'Neil showed one work The Parting Cheer showing emigrants departing the River Thames for the British Empire.

== Gallery ==
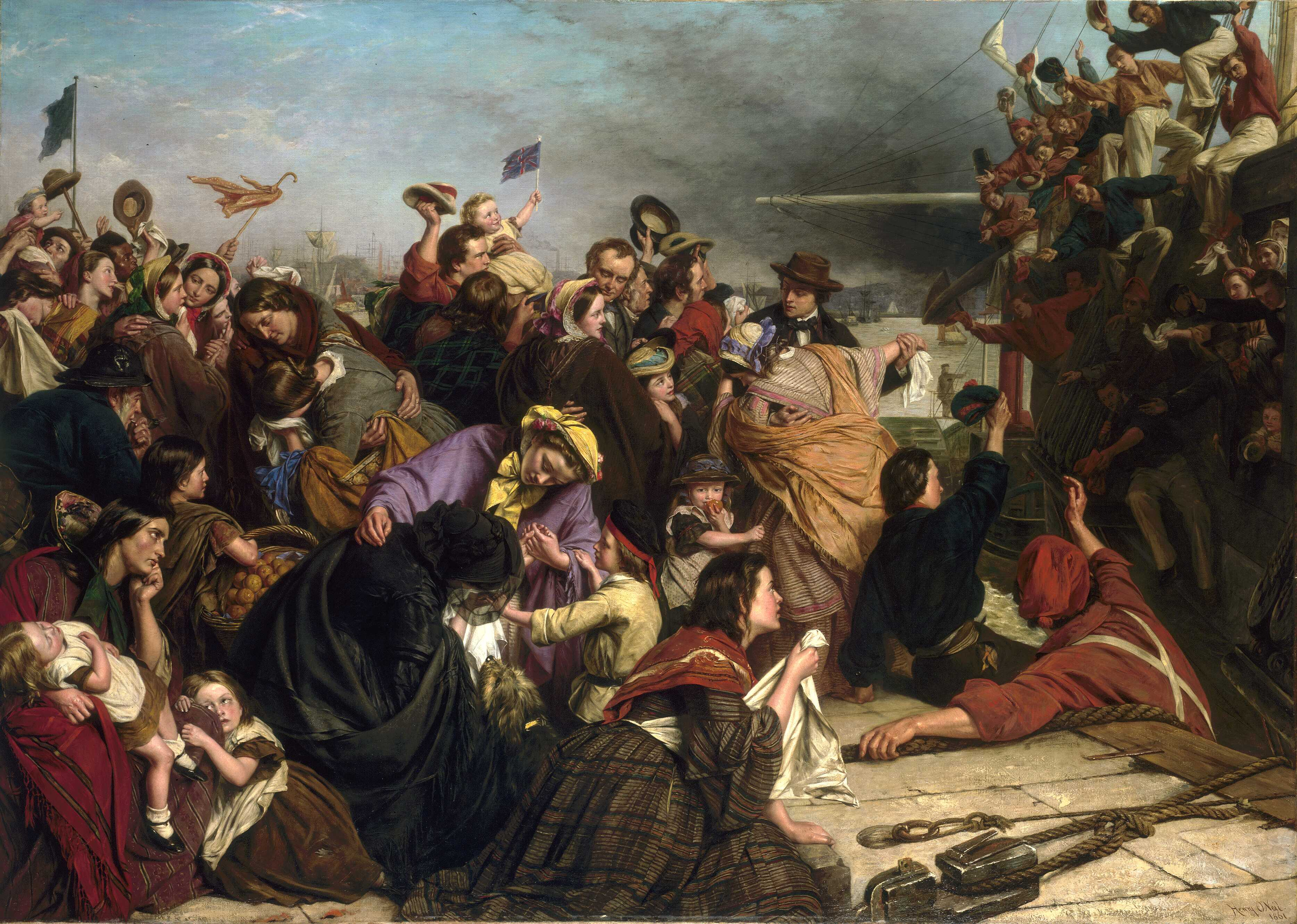
The Parting Cheer by Henry Nelson O'Neil

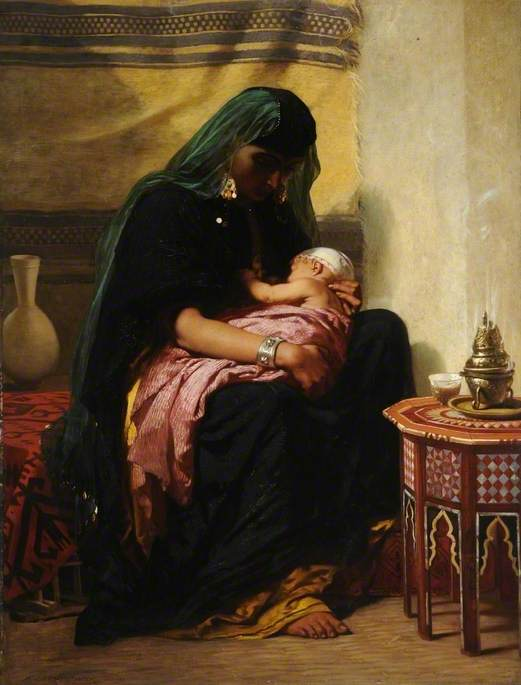
The First Born by Frederick Goodall

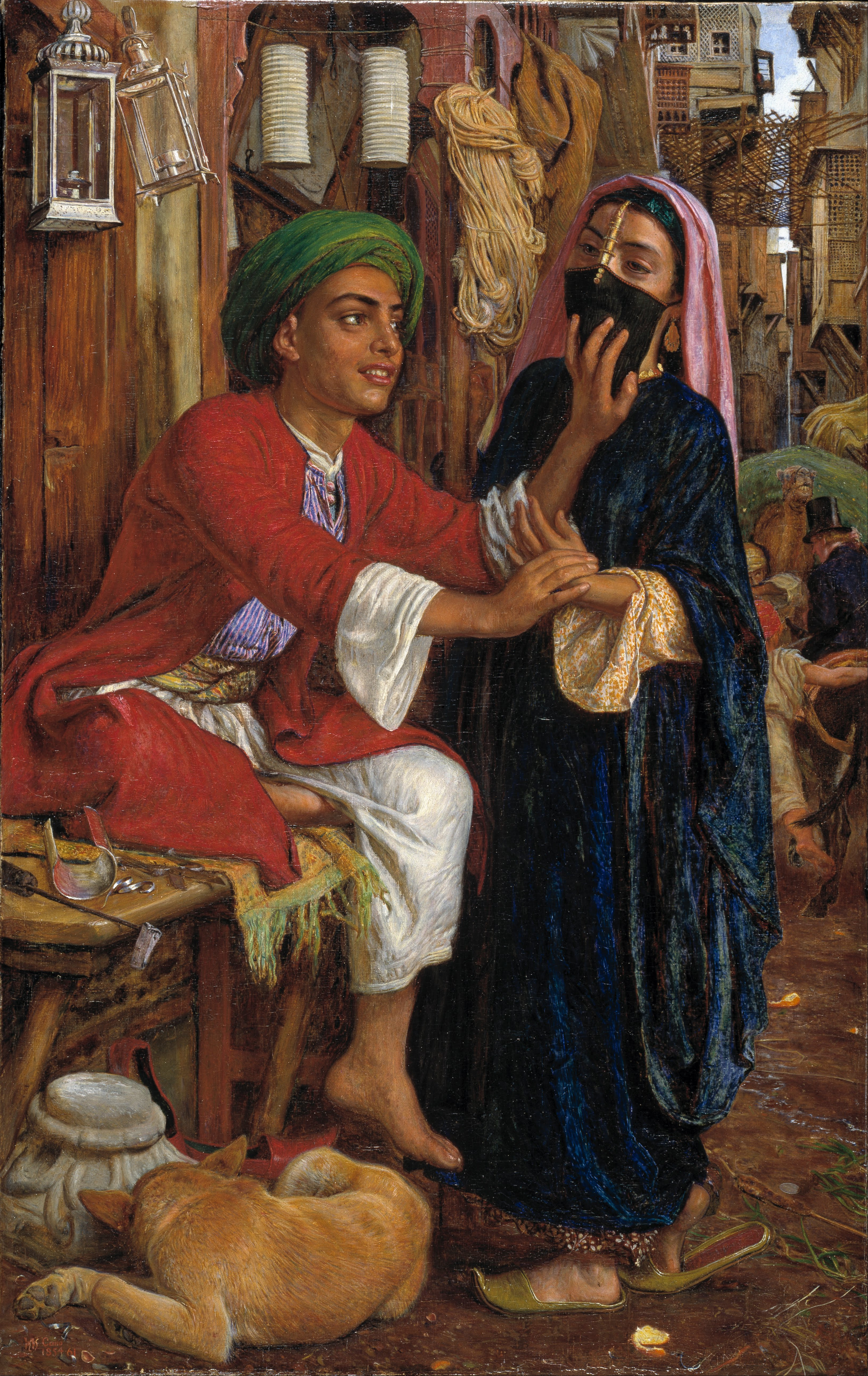
The Lantern Maker's Daughter by William Holman Hunt

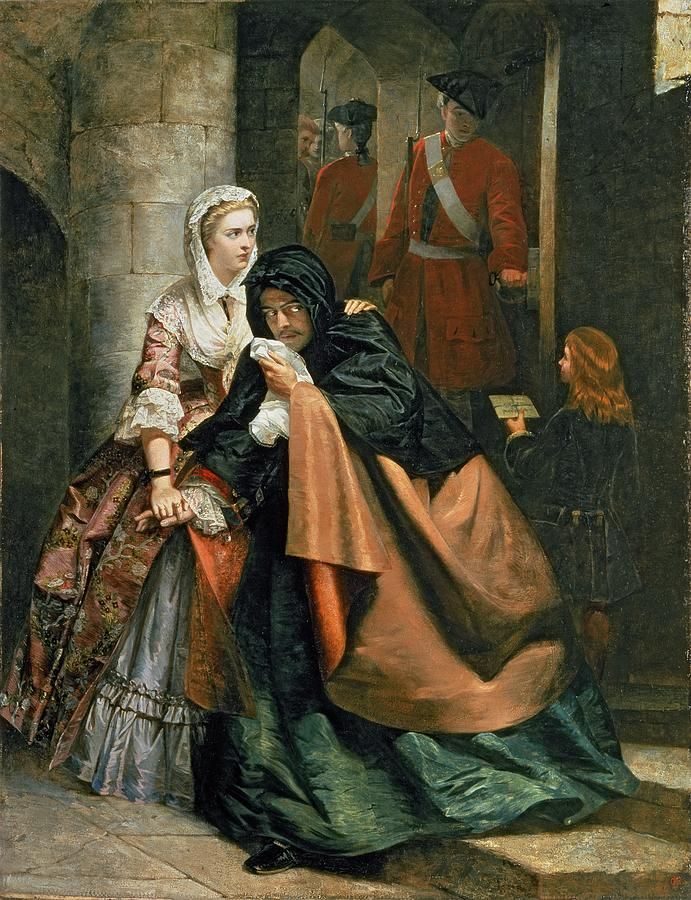
The Escape of Lord Nithisdale from the Tower by Emily Mary Osborn

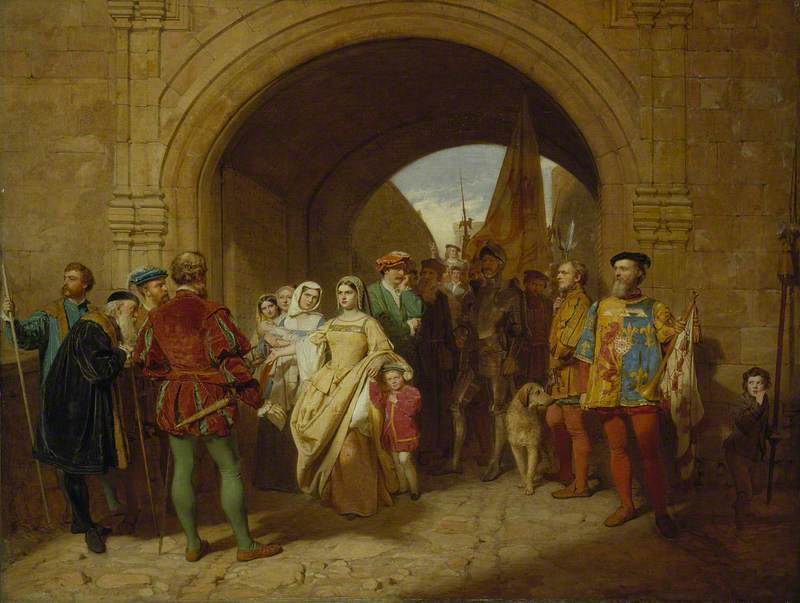
Queen Margaret's Defiance of the Scottish Parliament by John Faed

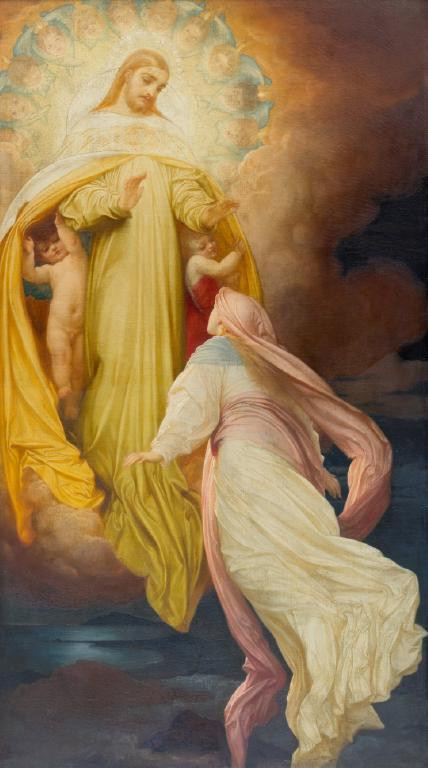
A Dream by Frederic Leighton

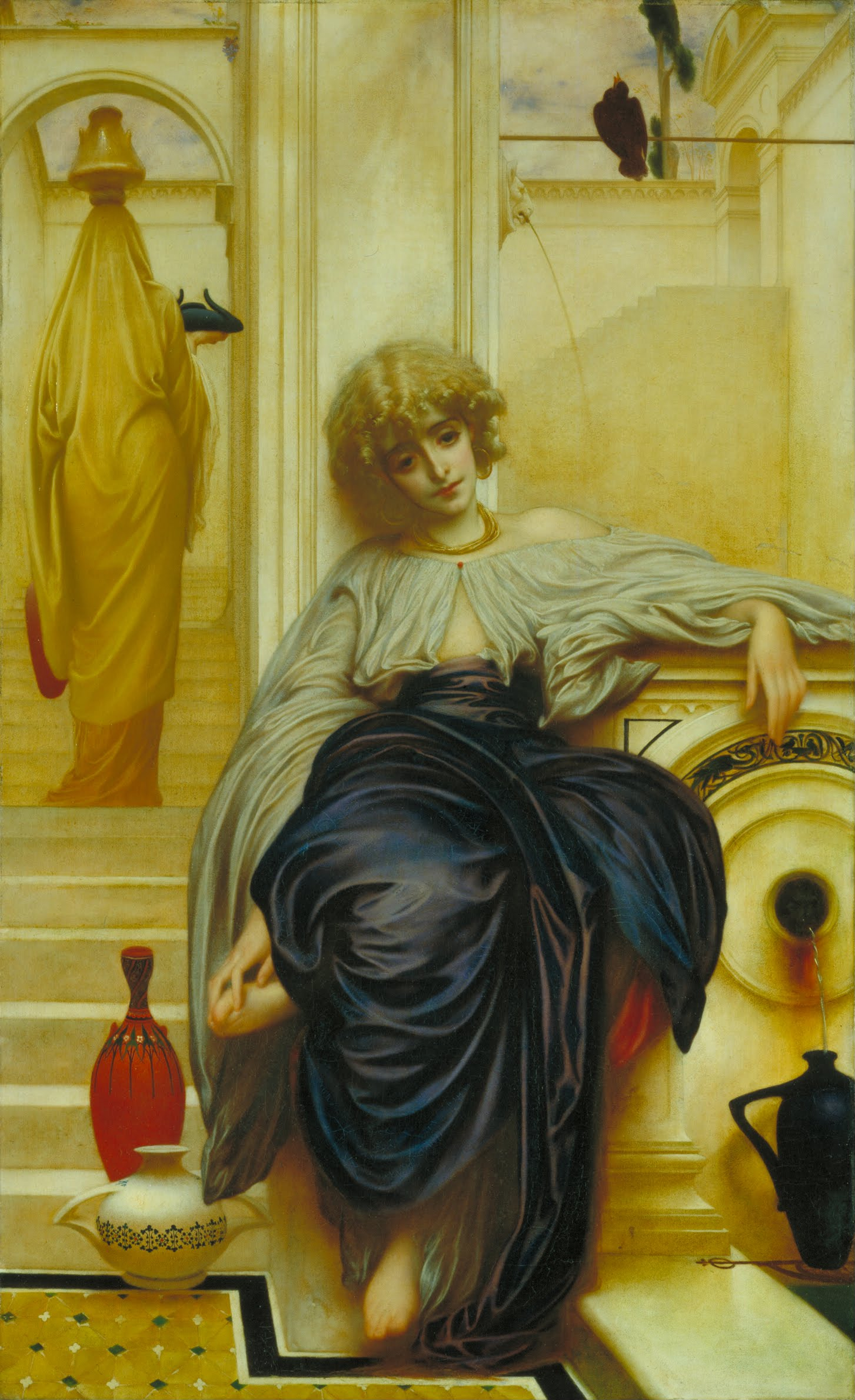
Lieder Ohne Worte by Frederic Leighton

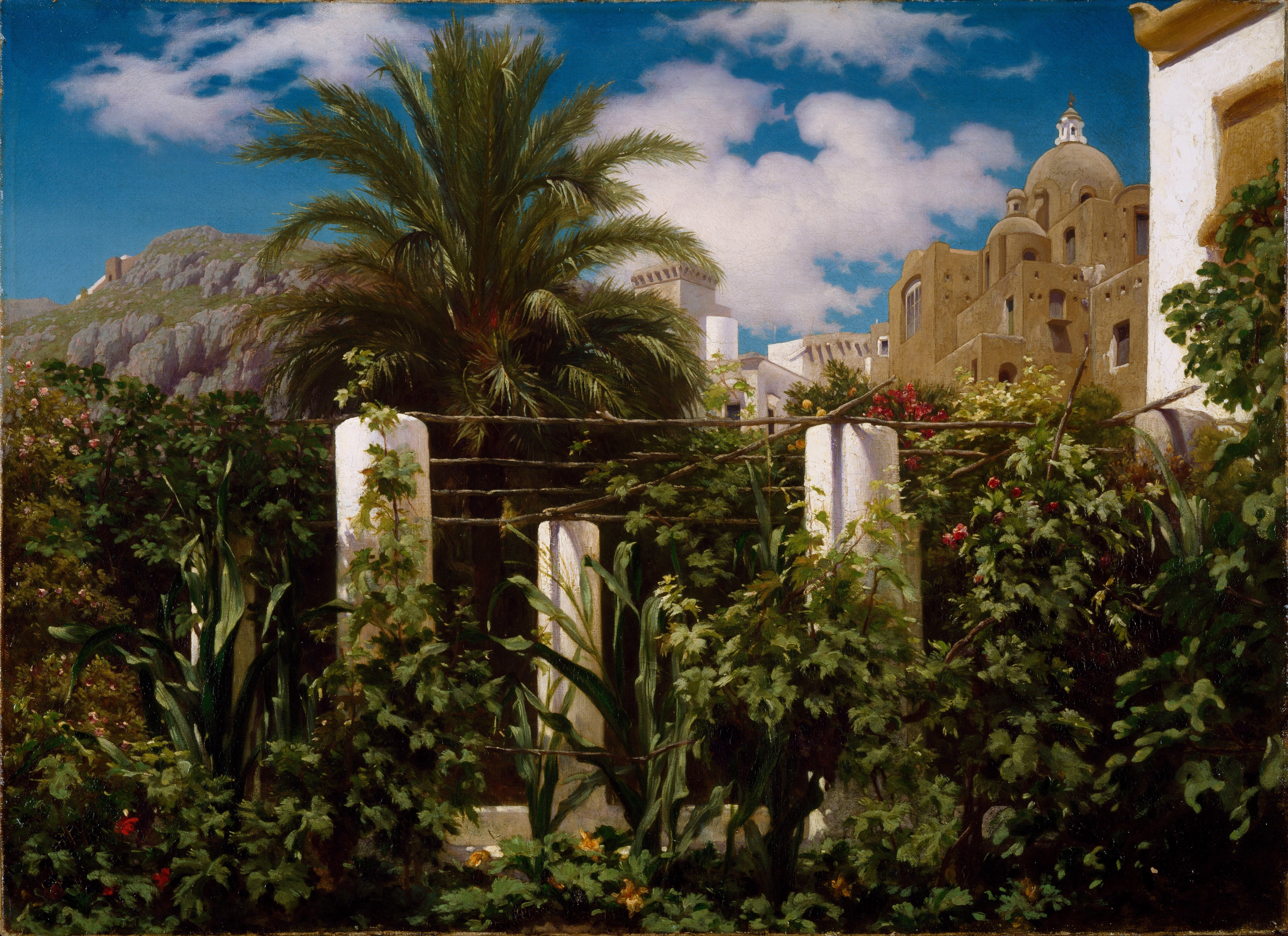
Garden of an Inn, Capri by Frederic Leighton

Peace, 1651 by Alfred Elmore

Marie Antoinette in the Prison of the Temple by Alfred Elmore

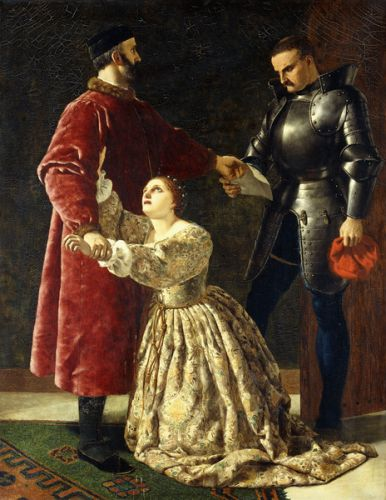
Duke Frederick Banishing Rosalind from his Court by Frederick Richard Pickersgill

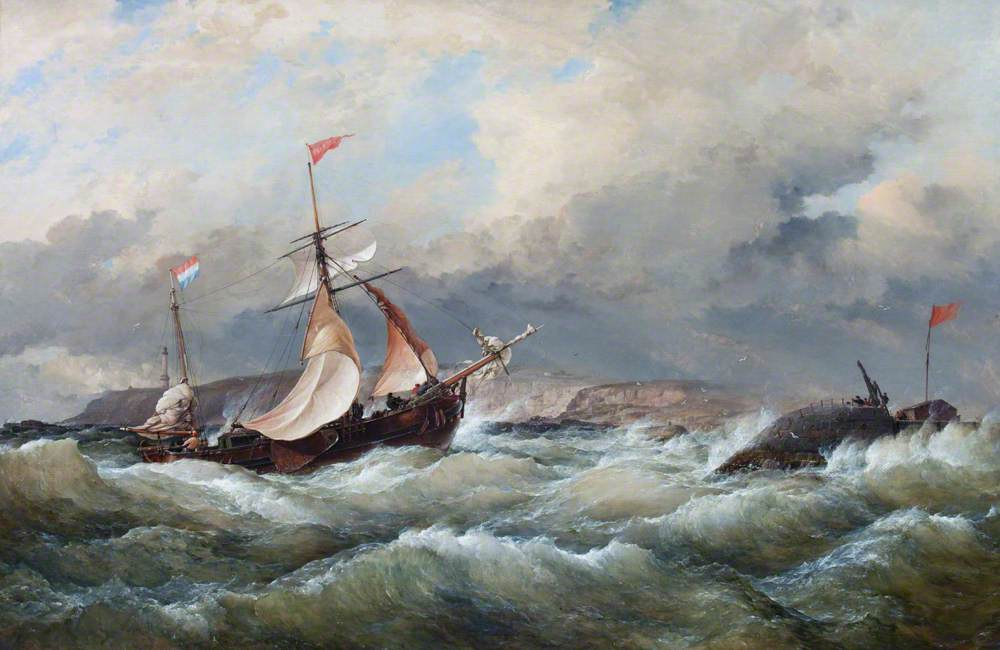
A Dutch Galliot Entering Aberdeen Harbour in a Storm by Edward William Cooke

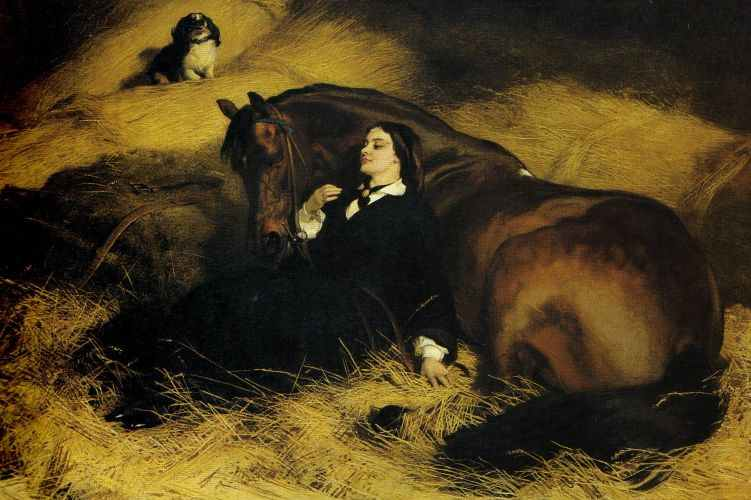
The Shrew Tamed by Edwin Landseer

Ruins of the Temple of the Sun at Baalbec by David Roberts

Billingsgate Fish Market by George Elgar Hicks

Young Lady Bountiful by Richard Redgrave

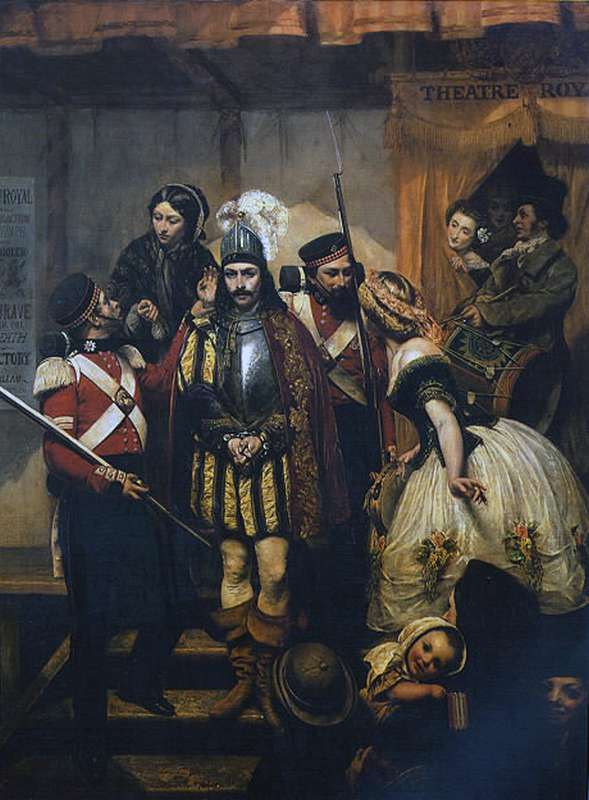
The Arrest of the Deserter by Rebecca Solomon

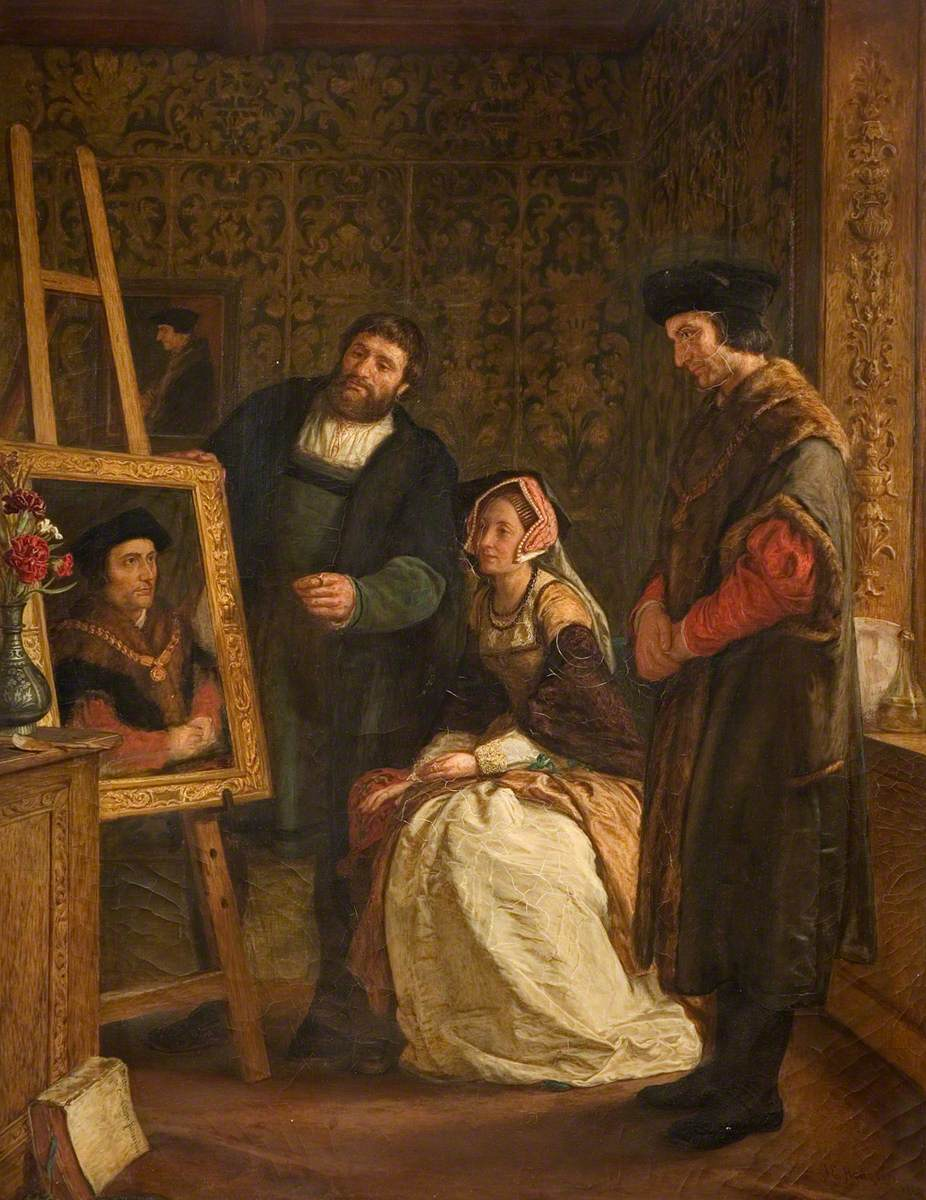
Holbein's Studio by John Evan Hodgson

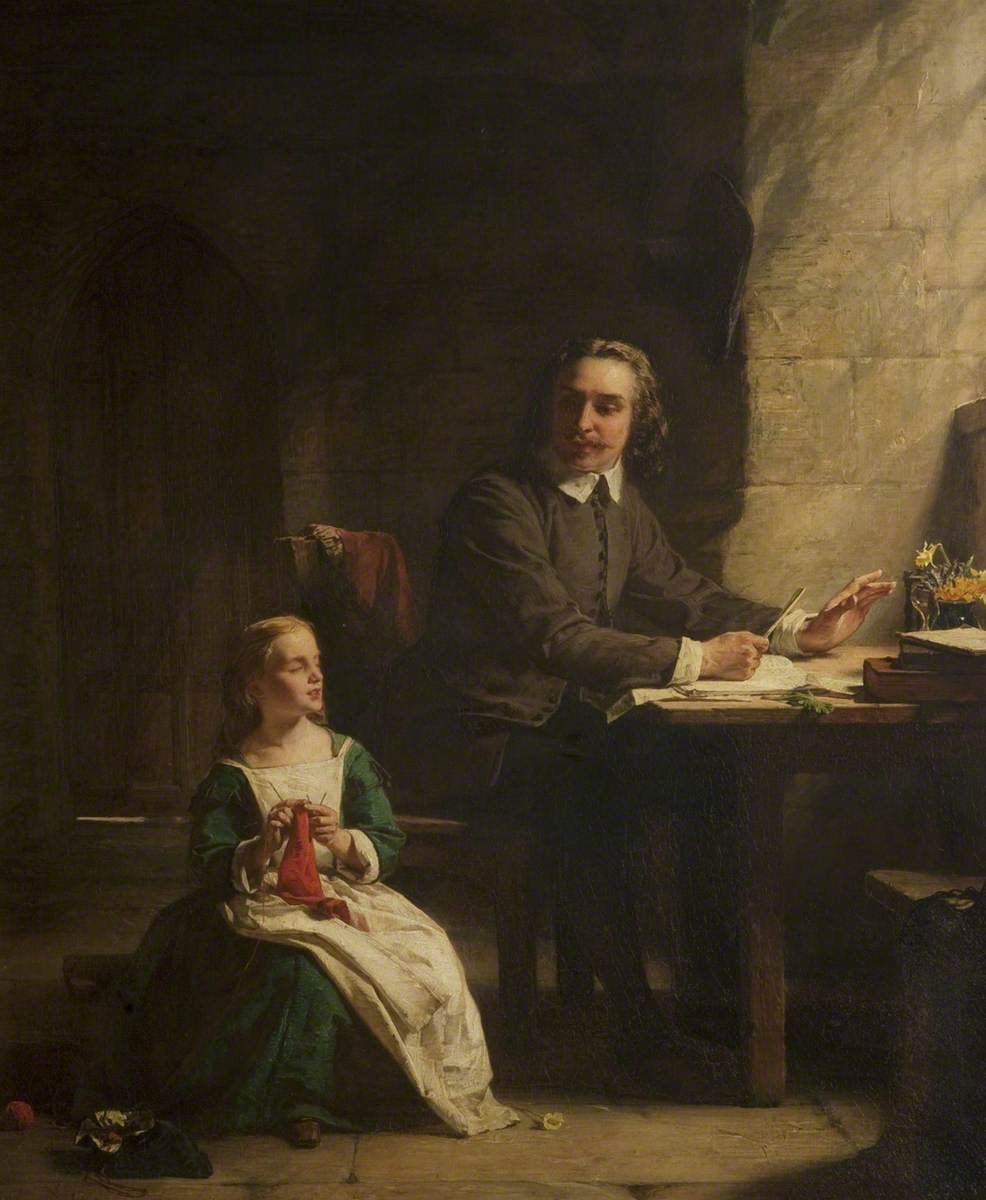
John Bunyan in Bedford Prison by Alexander Johnston

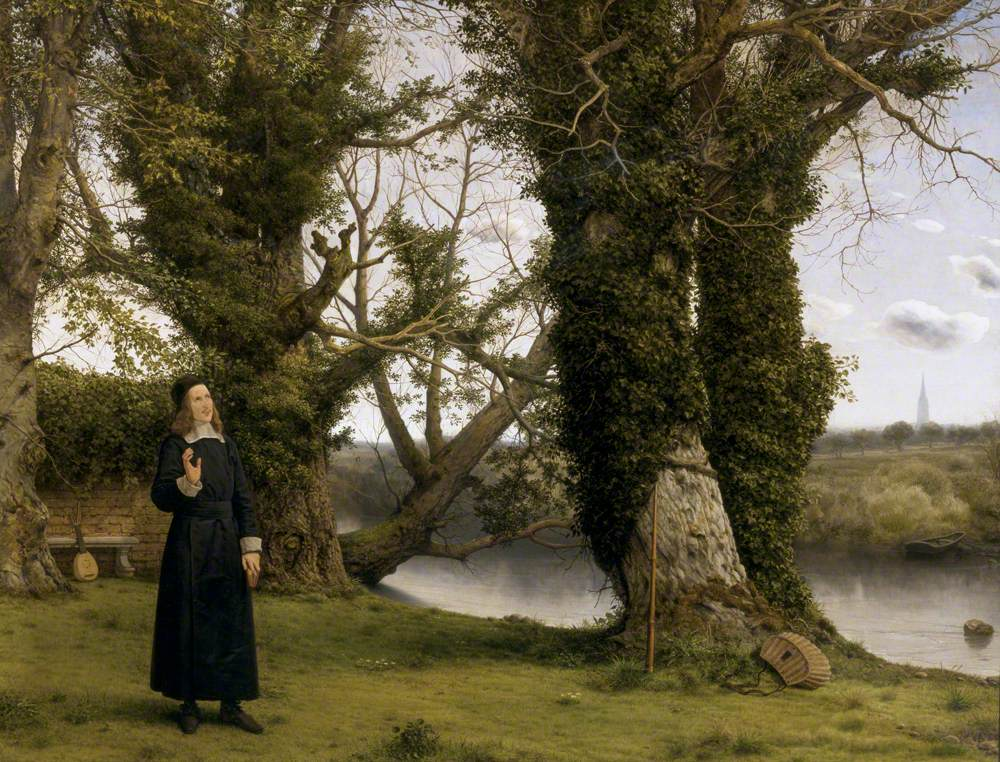
George Herbert at Bemerton by William Dyce

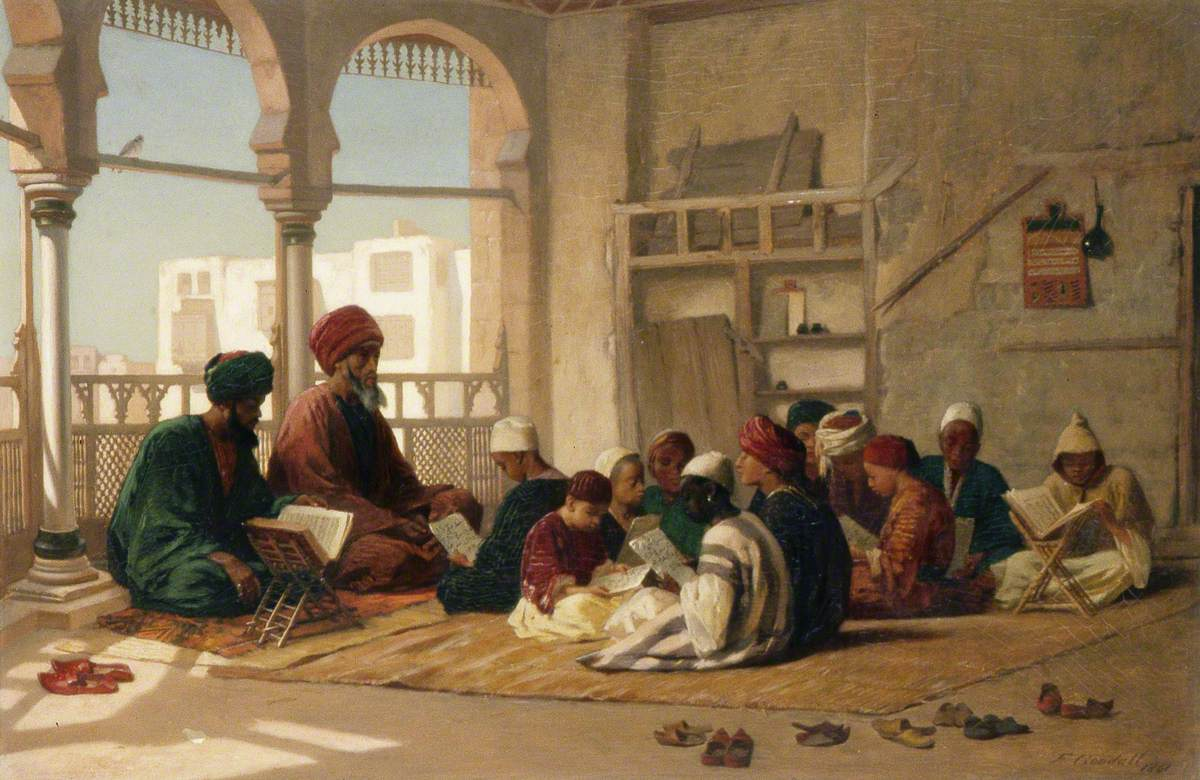
Sultan Hassan's School, Cairo by Frederick Goodall

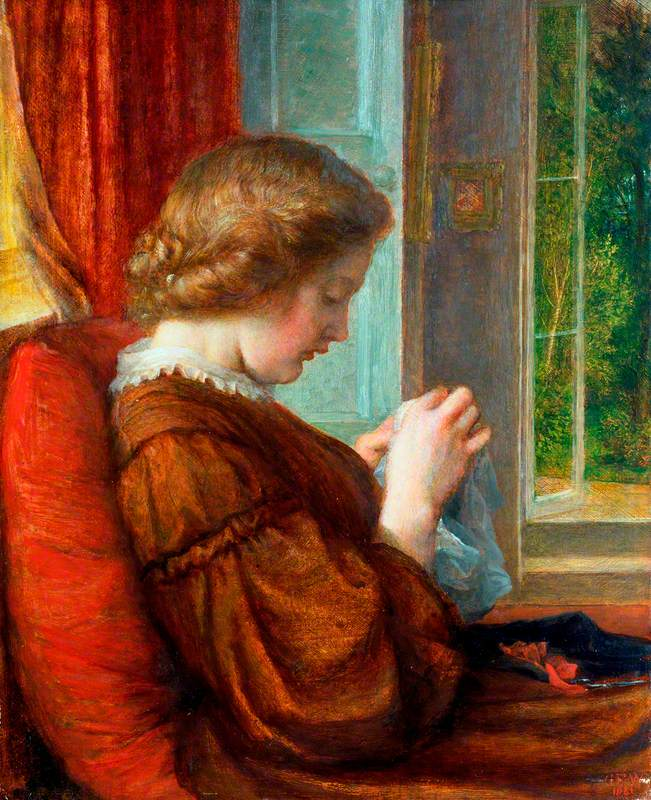
The Window Seat by George Frederic Watts

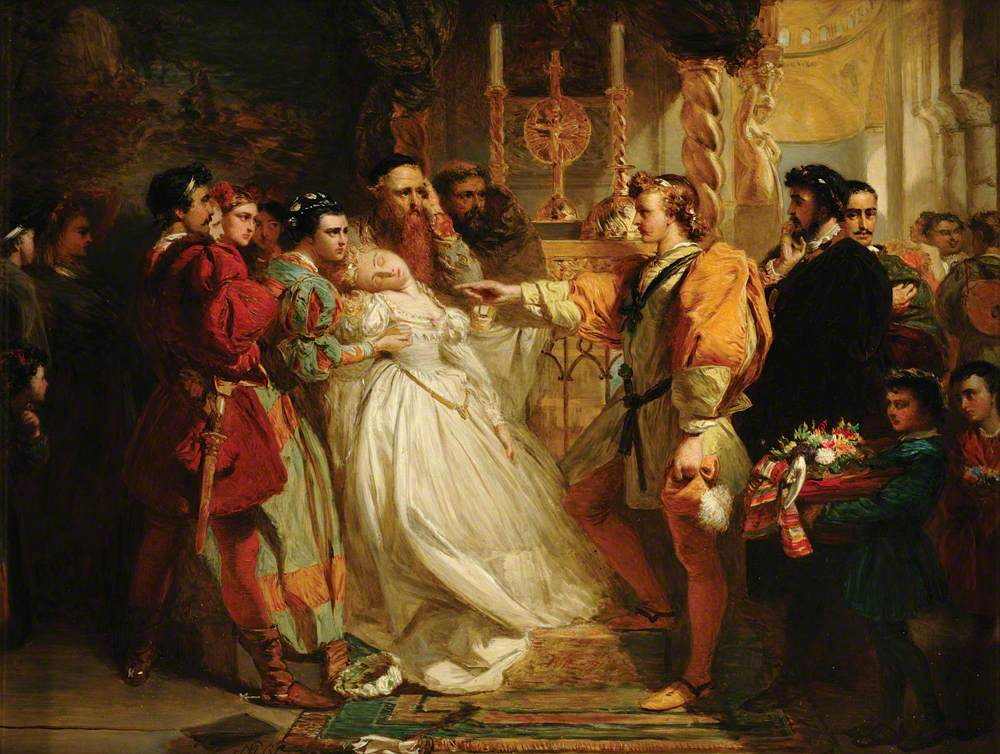
Claudio, Deceived by Don John, Accuses Hero by Marcus Stone

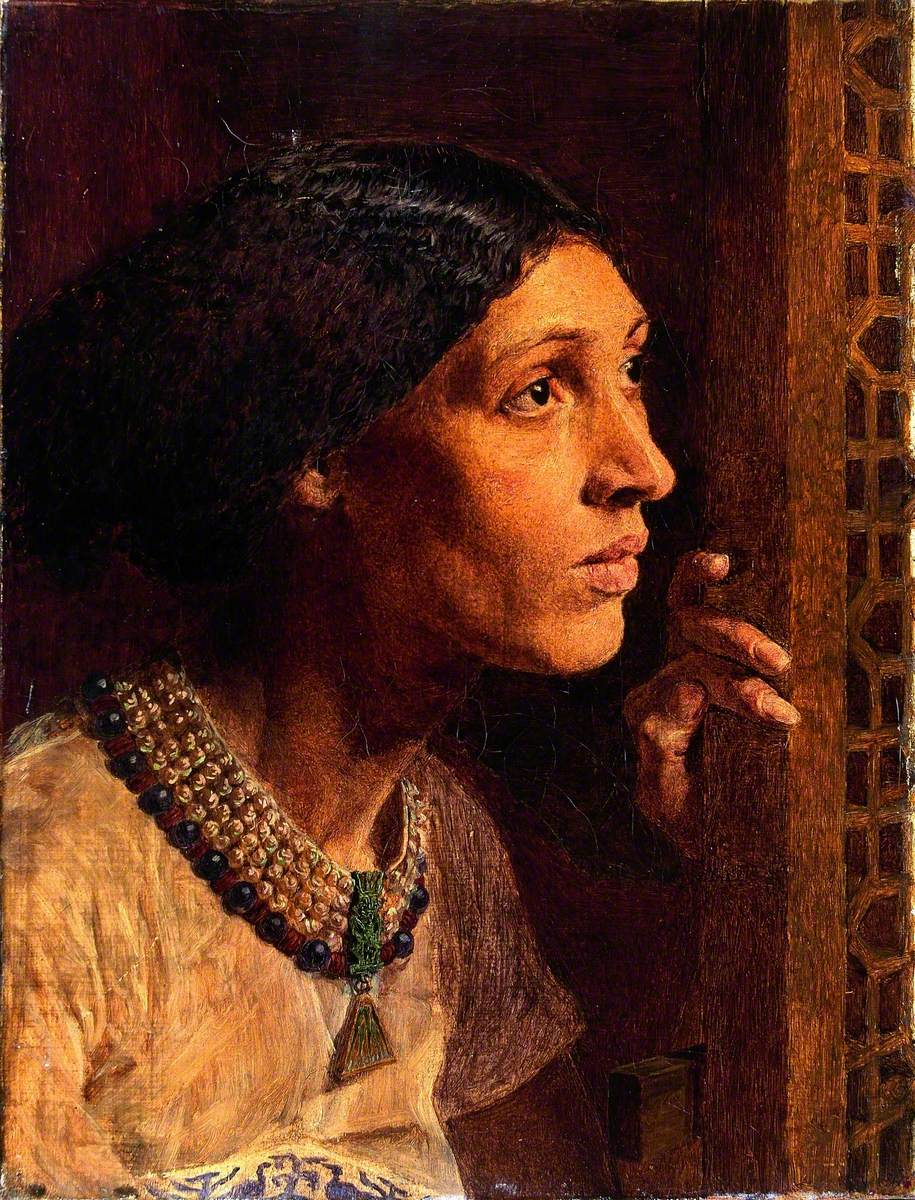
The Mother of Sisera by Albert Joseph Moore

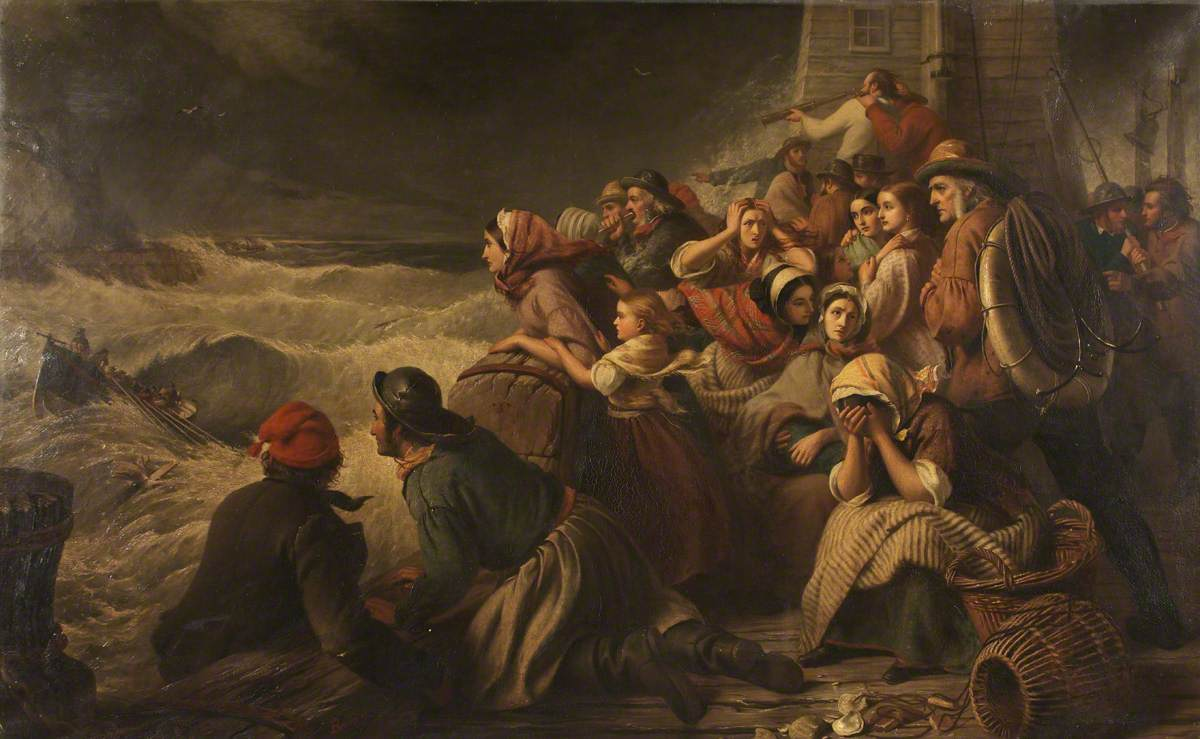
The Lifeboat Going to the Rescue by Thomas Brooks

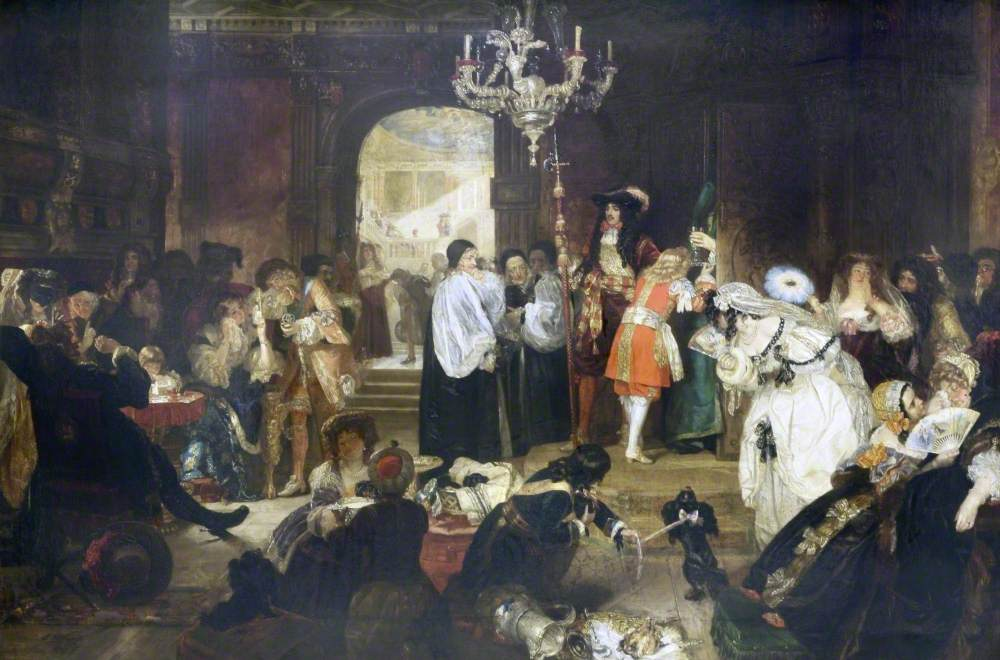
Whitehall During the Last Moments of Charles II by Edward Matthew Ward

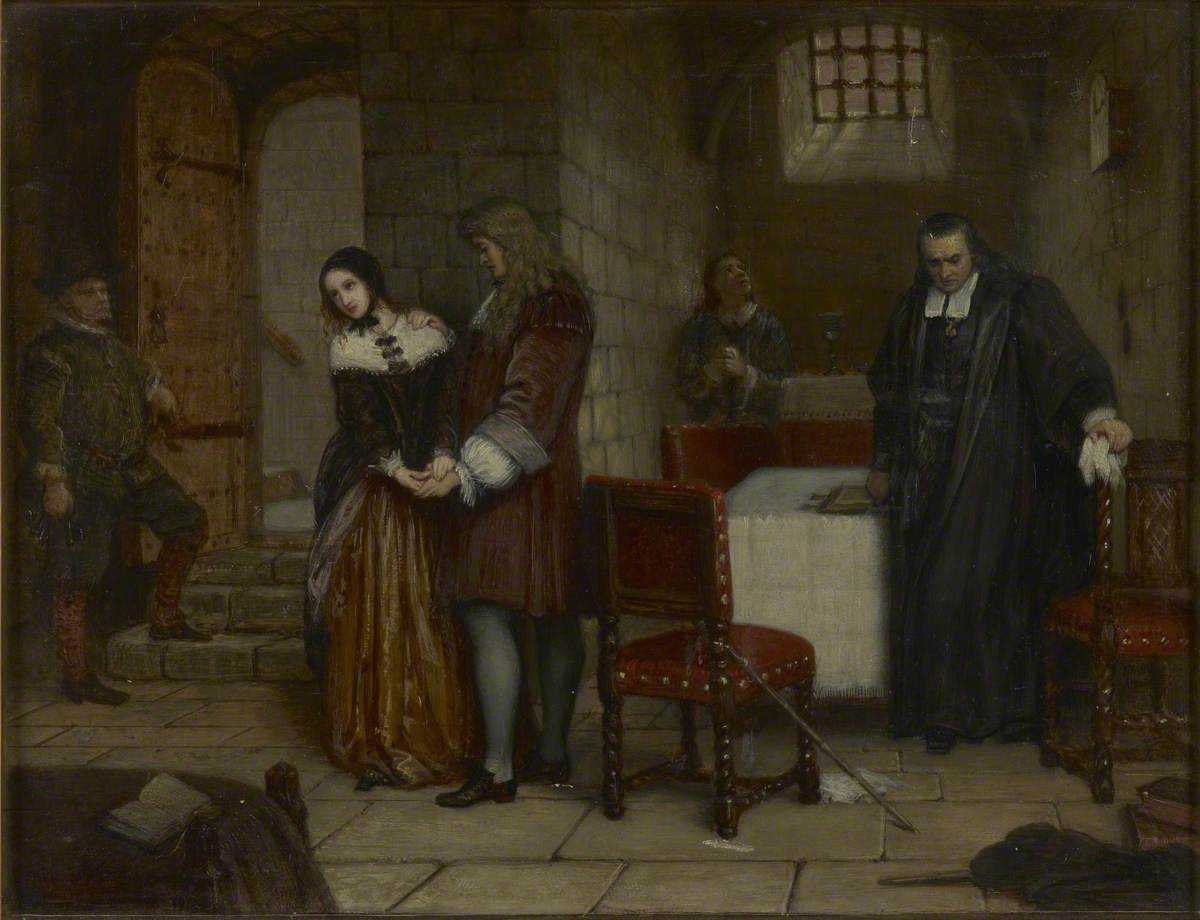
The Parting of Lord and Lady Russell by Charles West Cope

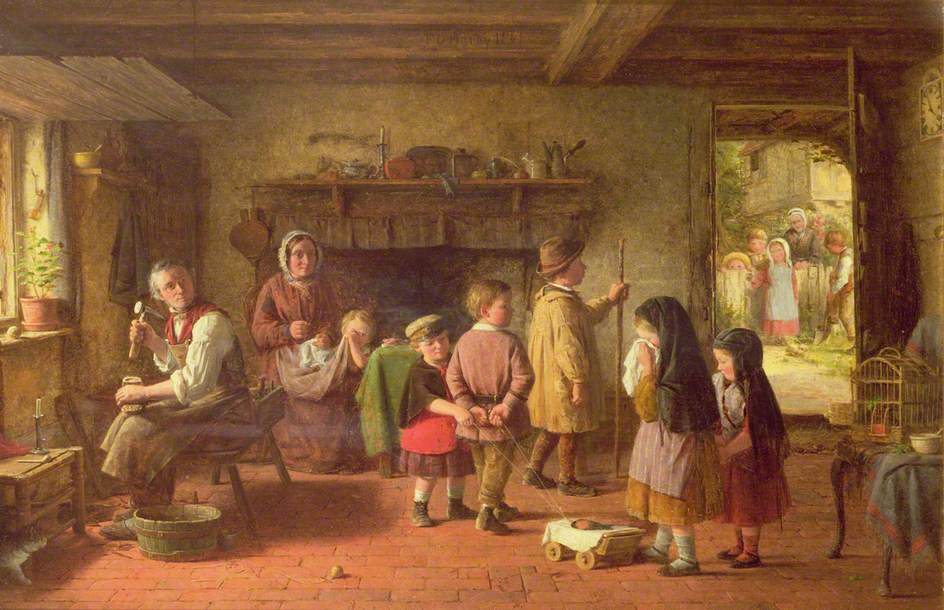
Early Sorrow by Frederick Daniel Hardy

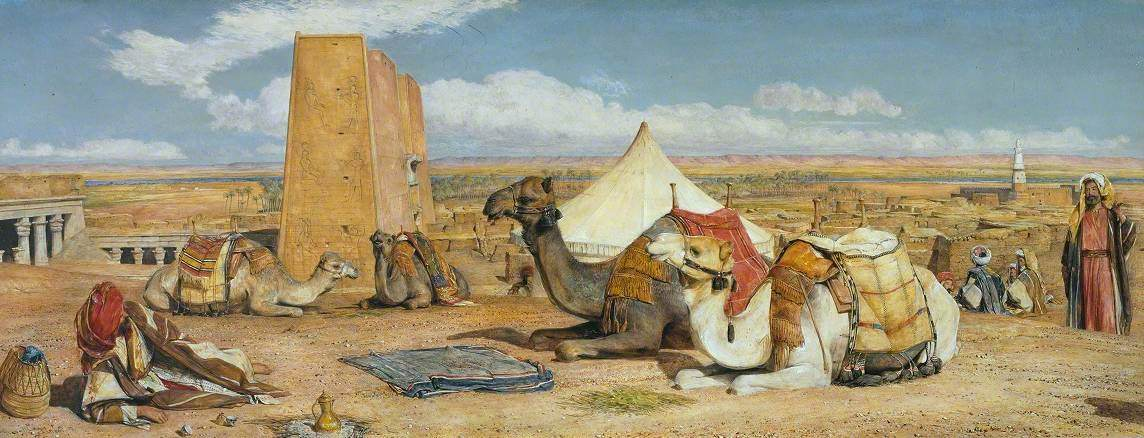
Edfu, Upper Egypt by John Frederick Lewis

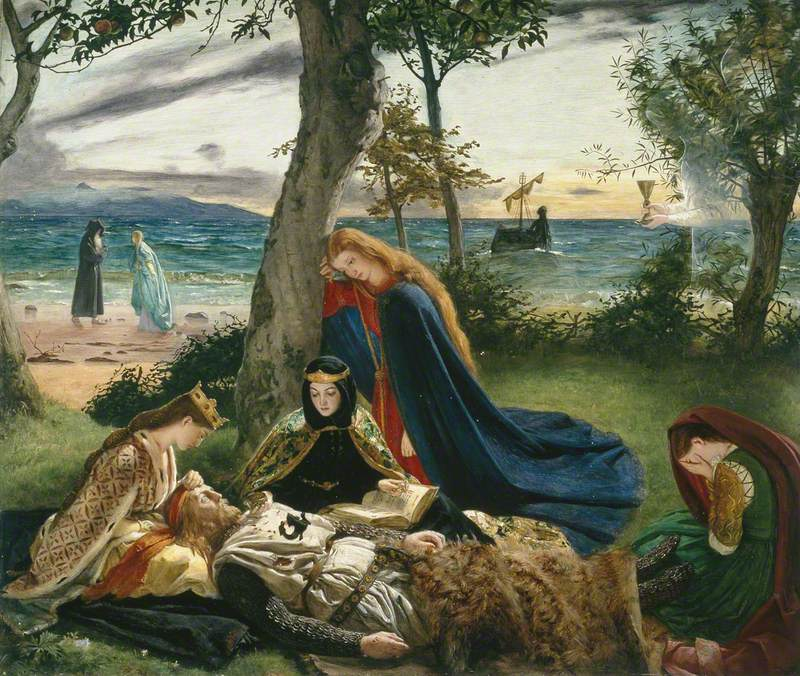
La mort d'Arthur by James Archer

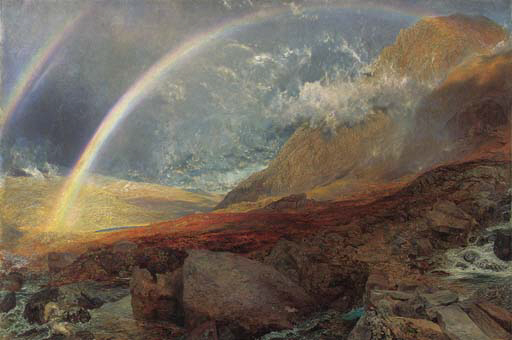
Mist Wreaths by Alfred William Hunt

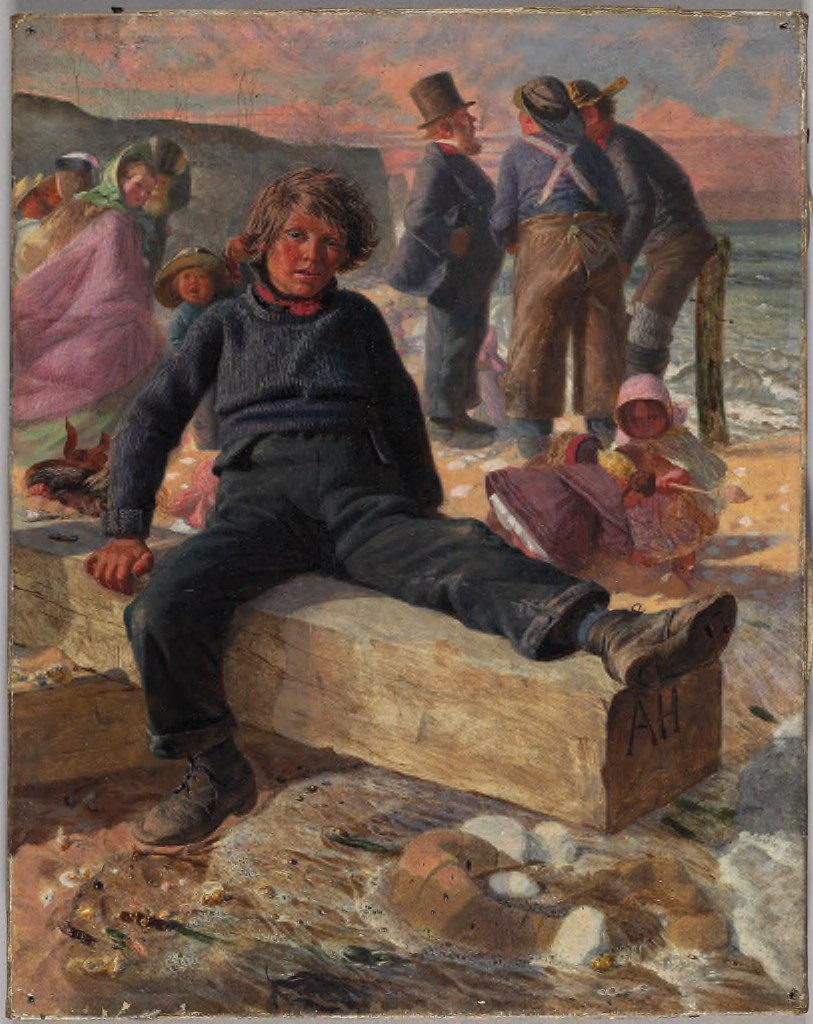
Here i' the Sands by Arthur Boyd Houghton

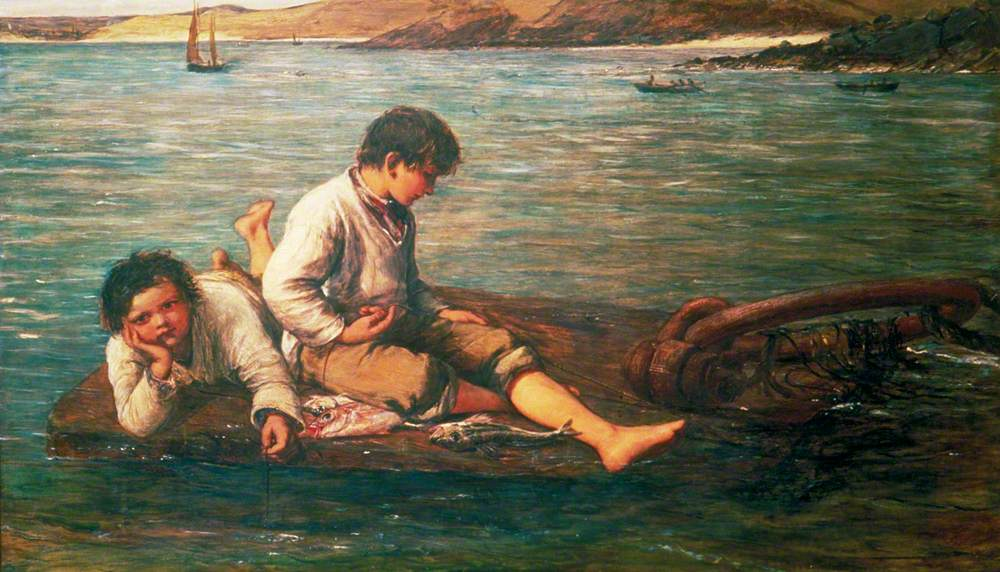
Sea Urchins by James Clarke Hook

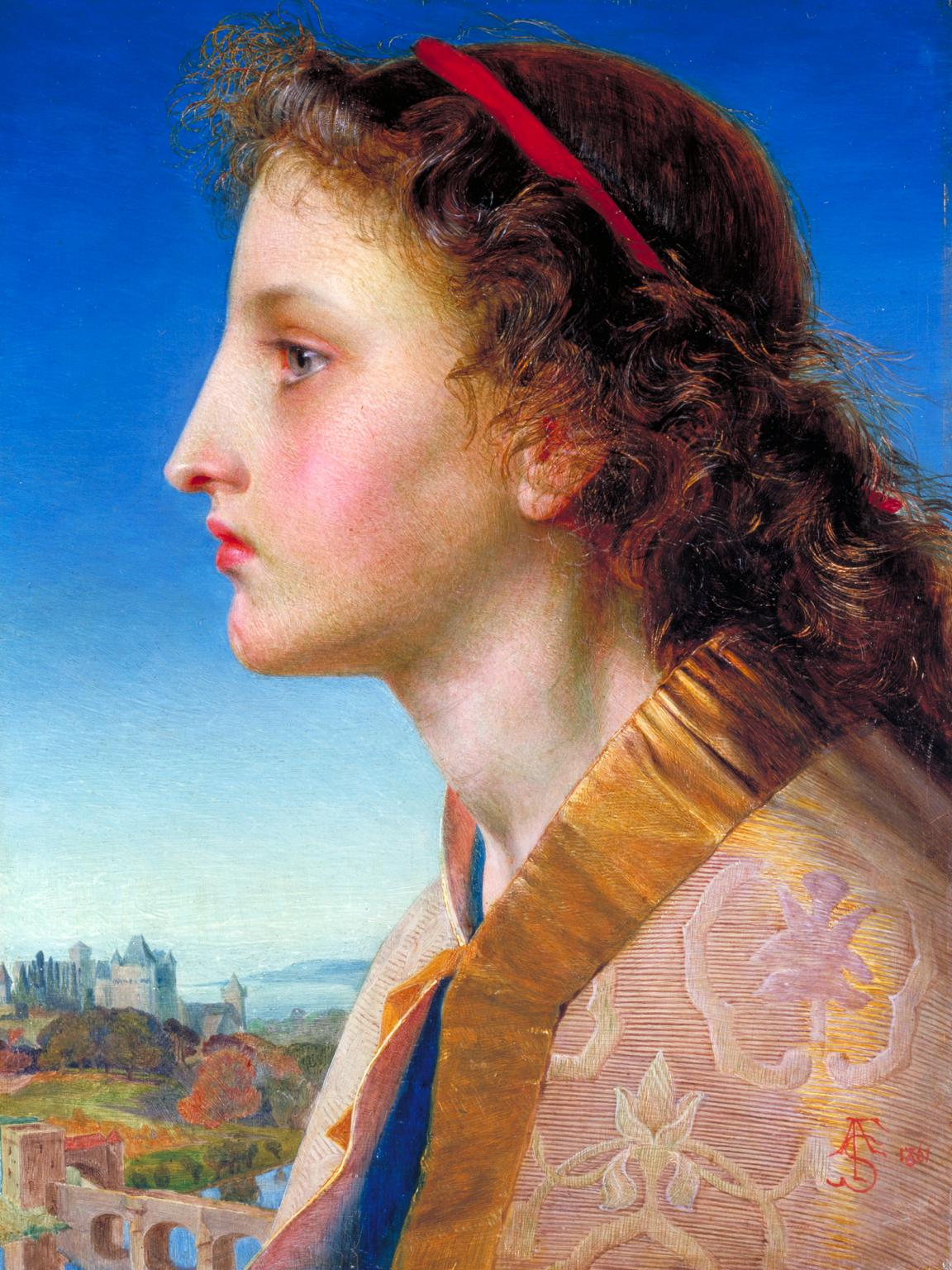
Oriana by Frederick Sandys

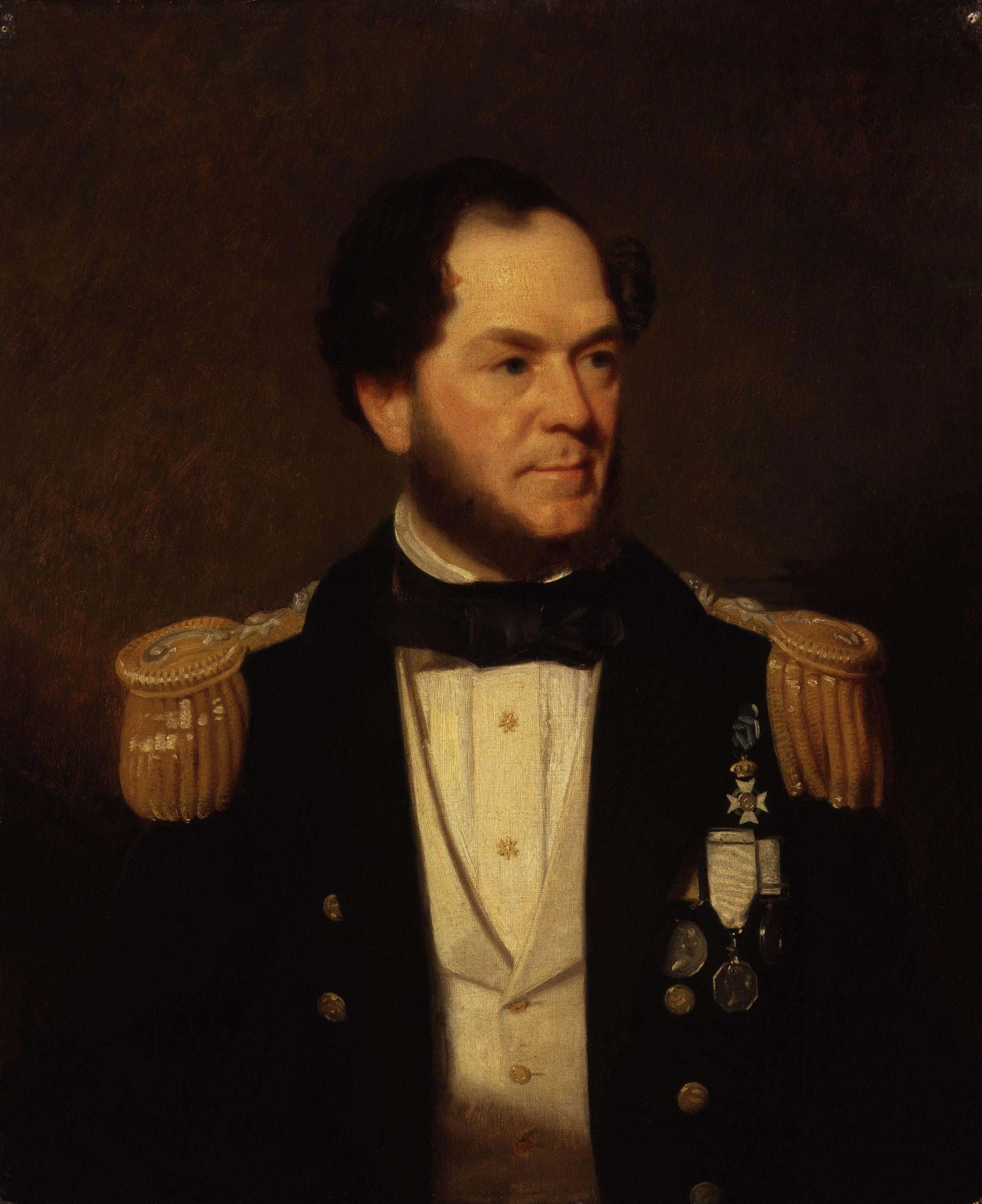
Erasmus Ommanney by Stephen Pearce

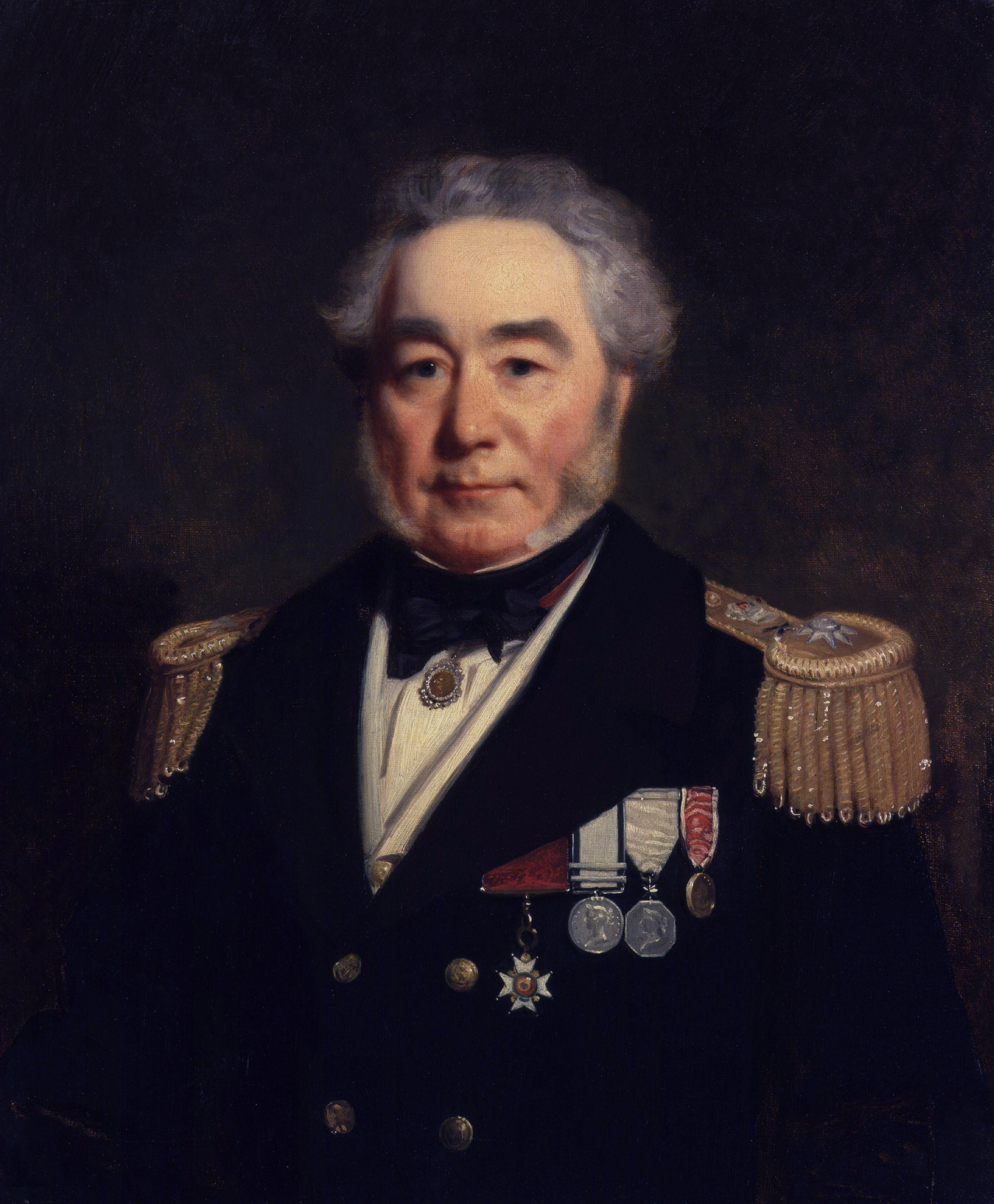
Horatio Thomas Austin by Stephen Pearce

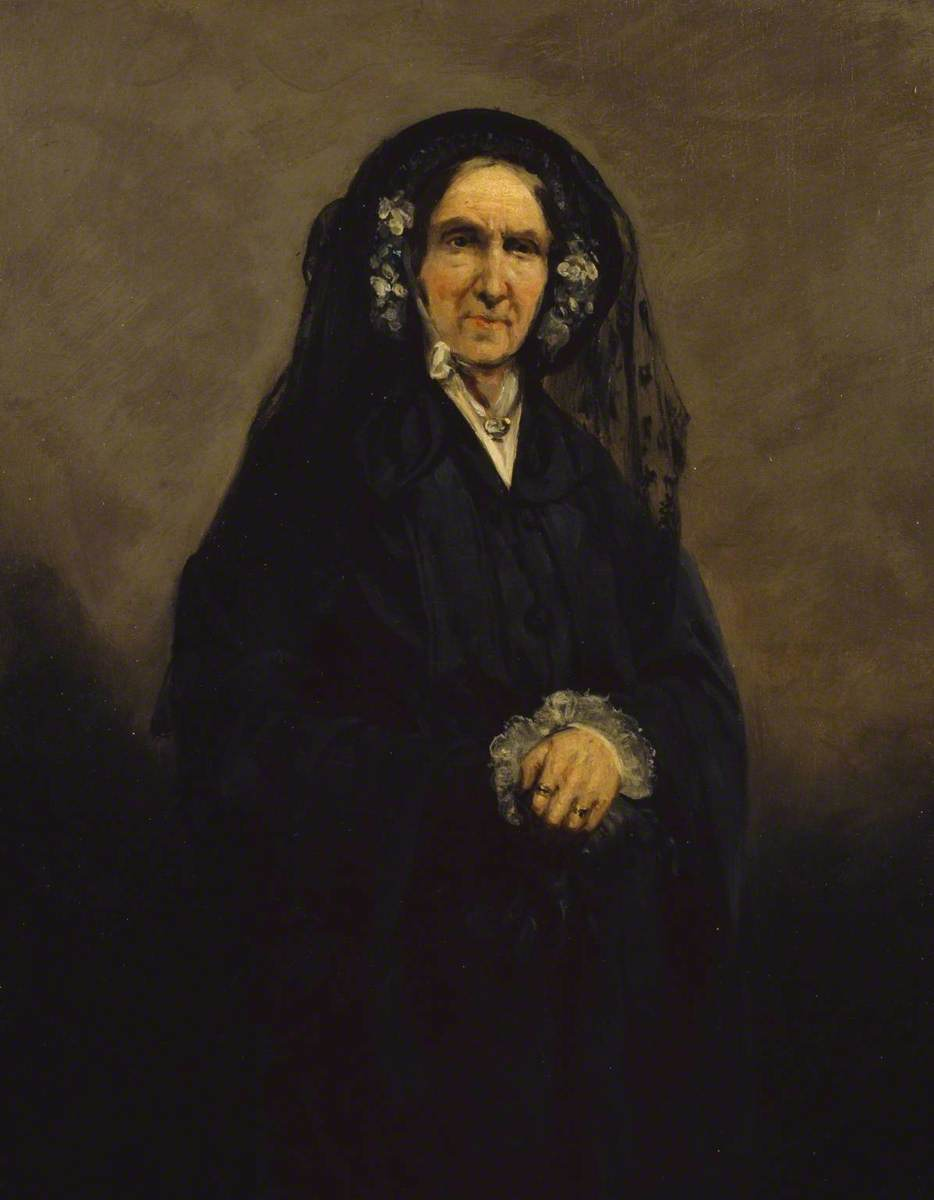
Mrs Baird by John Watson Gordon

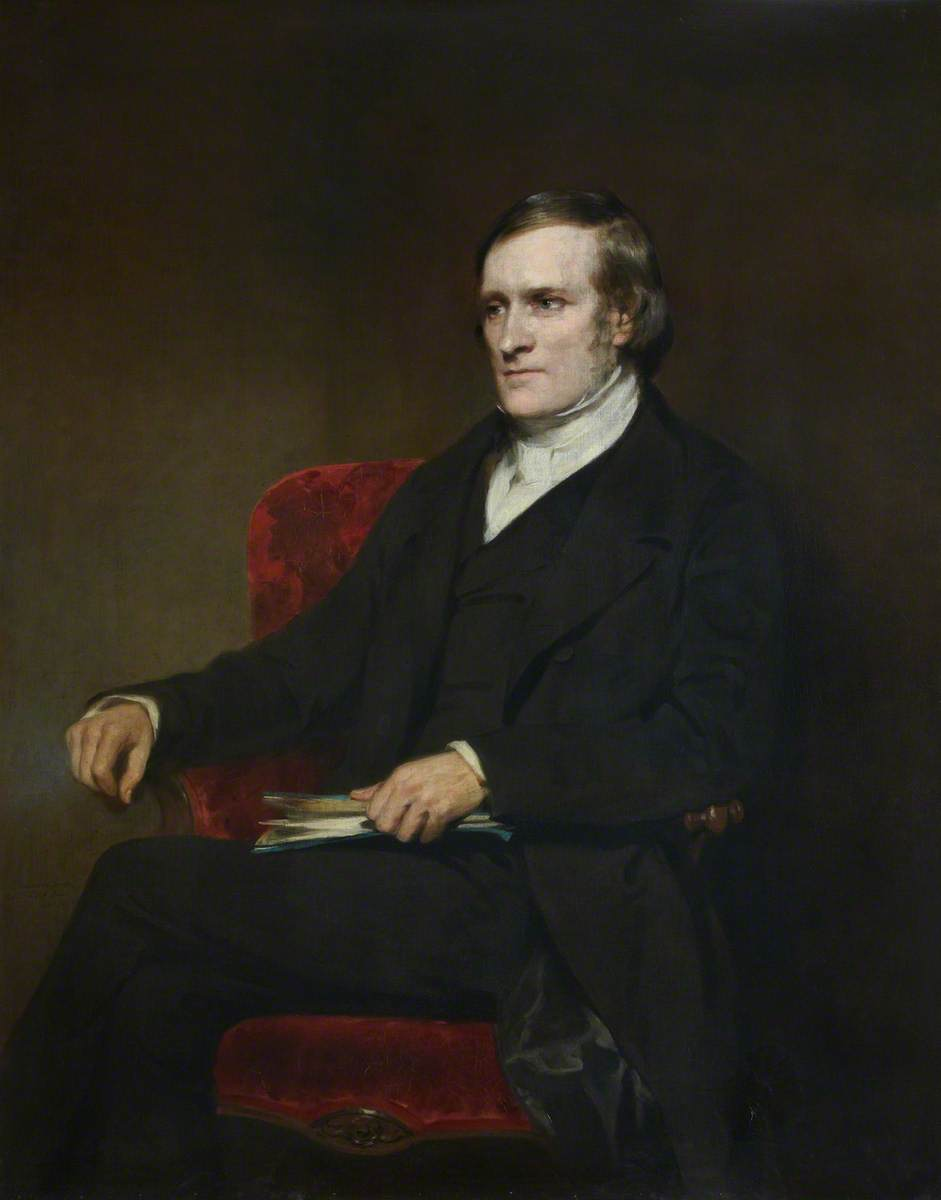
James David Forbes by John Watson Gordon

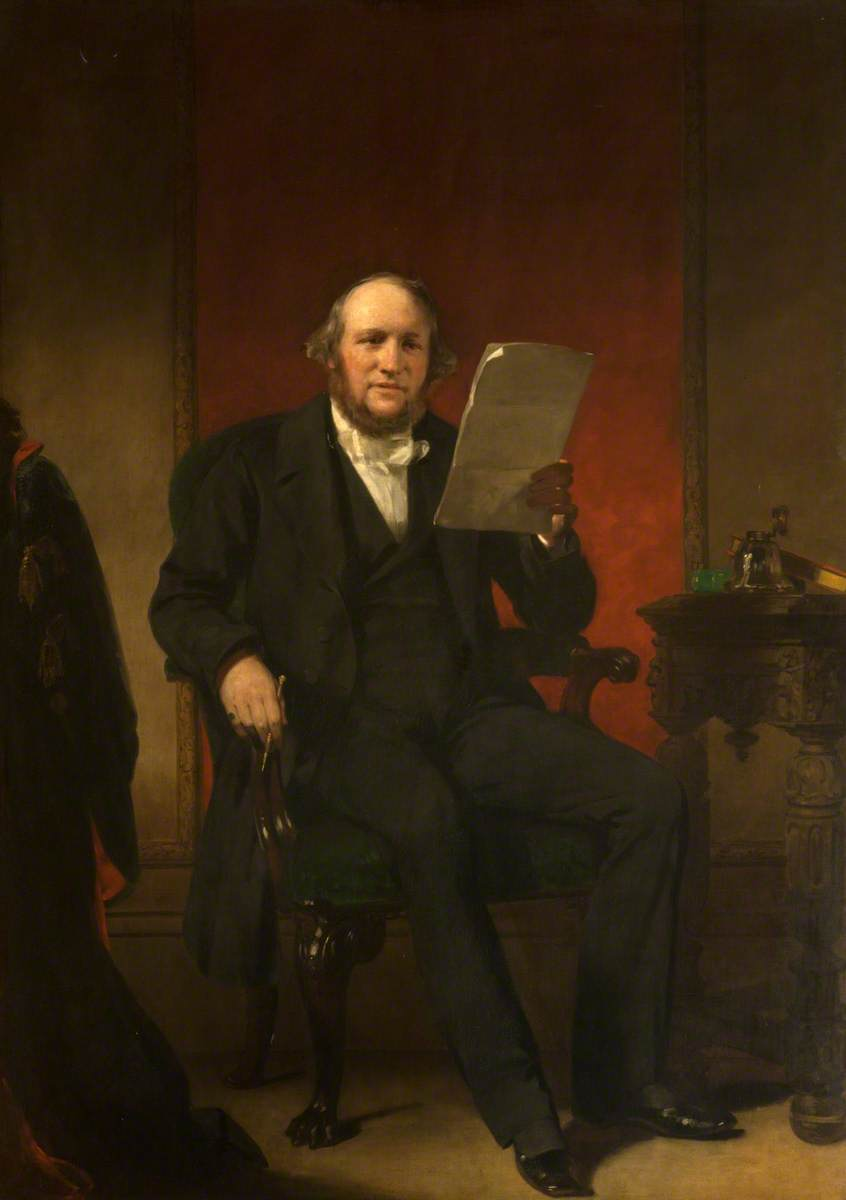
Alexander Wood by John Watson Gordon

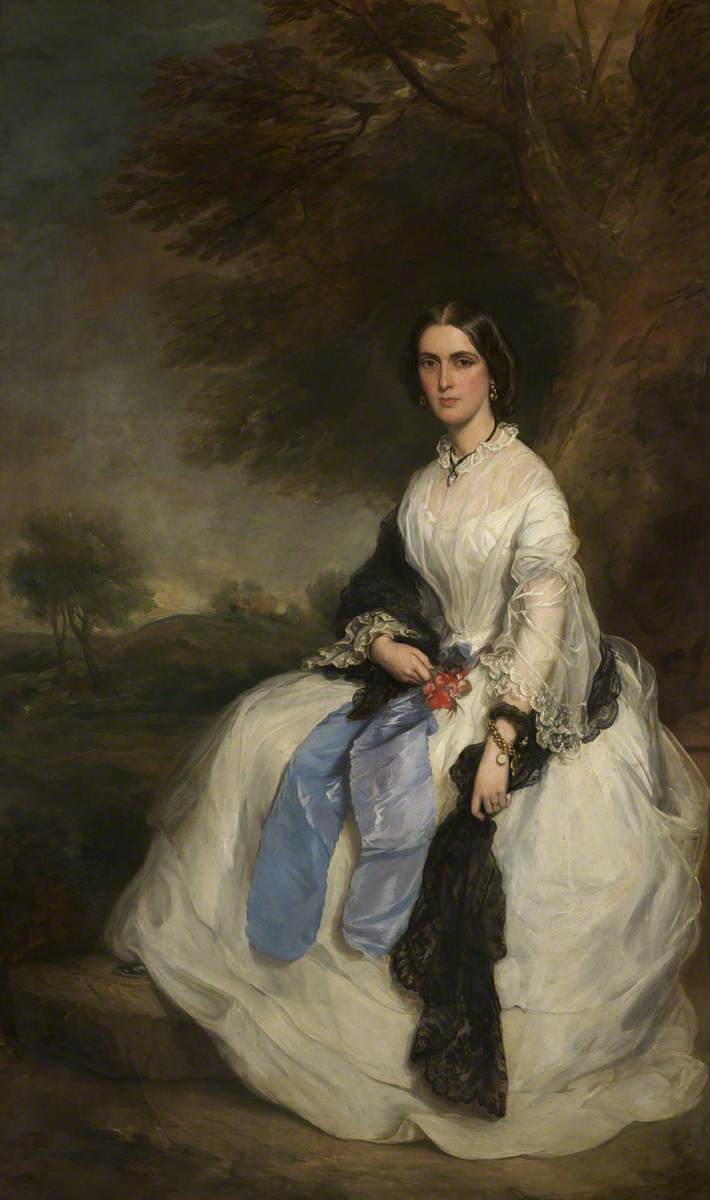
Margaret Hick by Francis Grant

== Bibliography ==
- McInnis, Maurie D. Slaves Waiting for Sale: Abolitionist Art and the American Slave Trade. University of Chicago Press, 2011.
