= The Draught Players =

Painting by Jean-Léon Gérôme

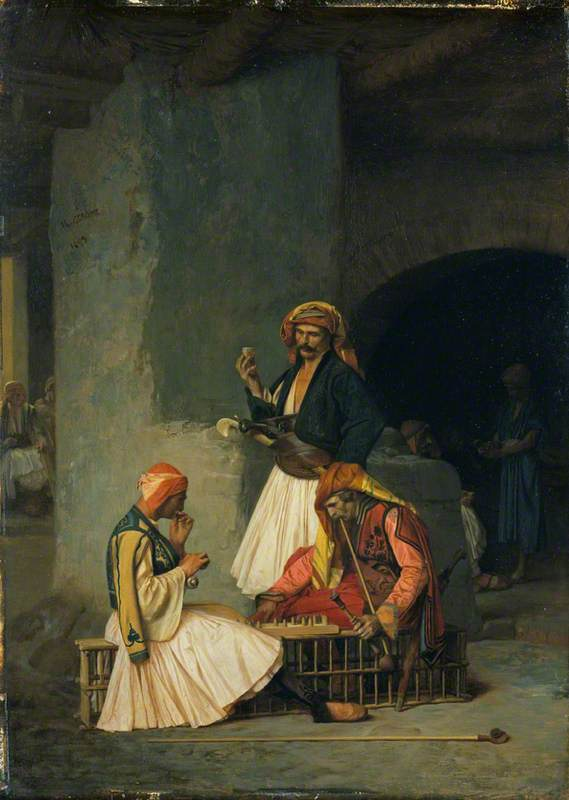
- Artist: Jean-Léon Gérôme
- Year: 1859
- Type: Oil on panel, genre painting
- Dimensions: 40.3 cm × 28.6 cm (15.9 in × 11.3 in)
- Location: Wallace Collection, London

The Draught Players (French: Arnauts jouant aux échecs) is an 1859 oil painting by the French artist Jean-Léon Gérôme. A genre painting, it depicts a game of draughts in Cairo. The players have been identified as Arnauts, Albanian soldiers on the service of Egypt.

It typifies the fashionable Orientalism in a European art of the period. The painting featured at the Exposition Universelle of 1867 held in Paris, a retrospective of artworks since 1855.

The picture was acquired by the Francophile art collector the Marquess of Hertford, having previously belonged to the dealer Paul Durand-Ruel. It now forms part of the Wallace Collection in Manchester Square in London.

== Bibliography ==
- Ingamells, John. The Wallace Collection: French Nineteenth Century. Trustees of the Wallace Collection, 1985.
- Mainardi, Patricia. Art and Politics of the Second Empire: The Universal Expositions of 1855 and 1867. Yale University Press, 1987.
- Weinberg, Helene Barbara, Bolger, Doreen & Curry, David Park. American Impressionism and Realism: The Painting of Modern Life, 1885-1915. Metropolitan Museum of Art, 1994.
