= Garden of an Inn, Capri =

Painting by Frederic Leighton

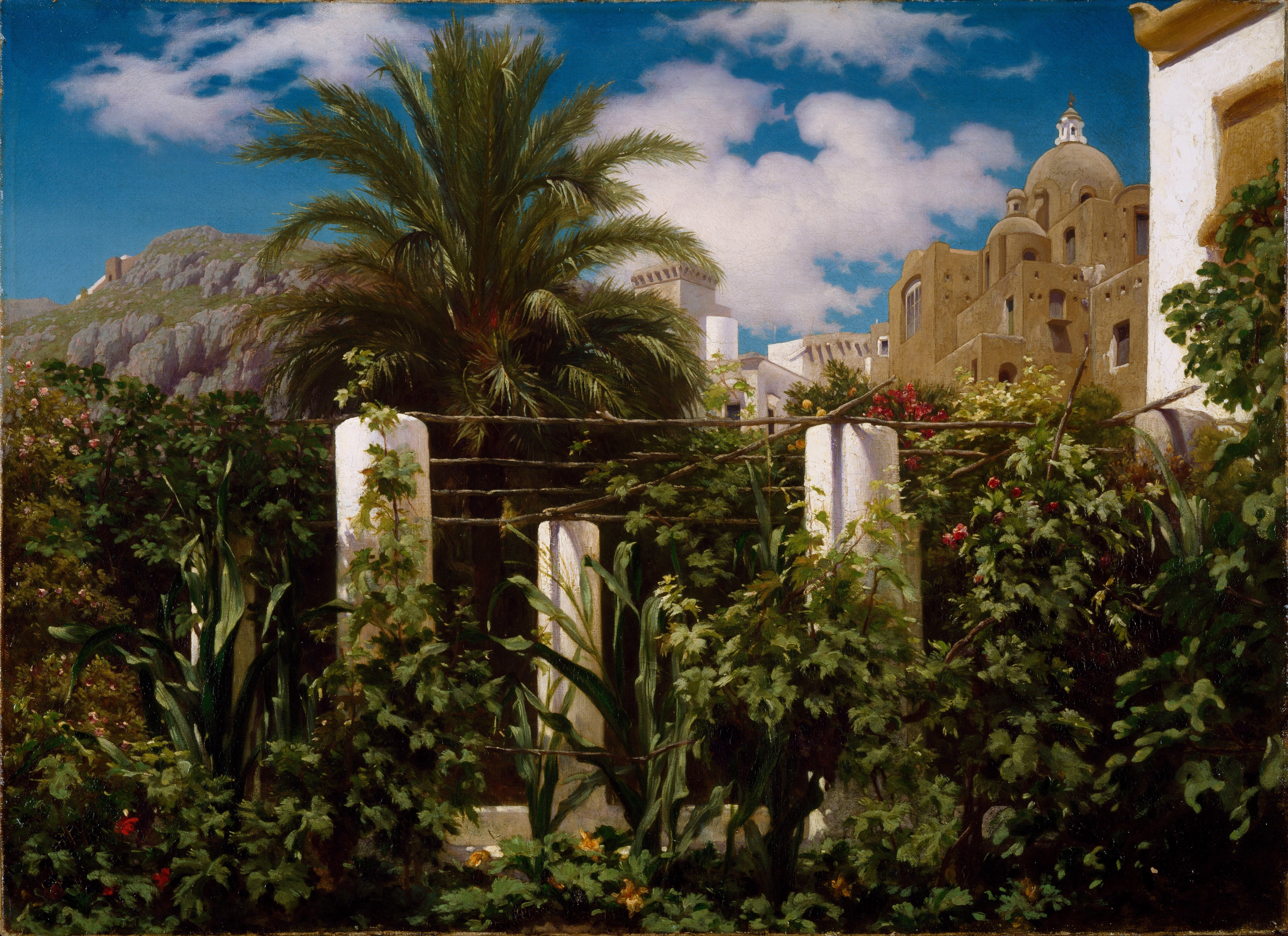
- Artist: Frederic Leighton
- Year: 1859
- Type: Oil on canvas, landscape painting
- Dimensions: 48.9 cm × 66.7 cm (19.3 in × 26.3 in)
- Location: Birmingham Art Gallery, Birmingham

Garden of an Inn, Capri is an 1859 landscape painting by the British artist Frederic Leighton. It features a view on the island of Capri in Southern Italy. It was likely produced en plein air during a visit Leighton made to Capri that year.

Leighton went on to become a major figure in British art and the President of the Royal Academy. The painting was displayed at the Royal Academy Exhibition of 1861 held at the National Gallery in London. Today it is in the collection of Birmingham Art Gallery, having been acquired in 1960.

== Bibliography ==
- Ash, Russell. Victorian Masters of Their Art. Pavilion, 1999.
- Wildman, Stephen, Marsh, Jan & Christian, John. Visions of Love and Life: Pre-Raphaelite Art from the Birmingham Collection, England. Art Services International, 1995.
