= Billingsgate Fish Market (painting) =

Painting by George Elgar Hicks

- Artist: George Elgar Hicks
- Year: 1861
- Type: Oil on canvas, genre painting
- Location: Private Collection

Billingsgate Fish Market is an 1861 genre painting by the English George Elgar Hicks. It portrays the hectic interior of Billingsgate Fish Market in the mid-Victorian era. It was then located at its historic site in the district of Billingsgate in the City of London.

Hicks had enjoyed great success with his 1859 painting Dividend Day at the Bank of England and had followed it up with The General Post Office, One Minute to Six. This painting continued his series of depictions of everyday life in the capital.

The painting was displayed at the Royal Academy Exhibition of 1861 at the National Gallery.

== Bibliography ==
- Keating, P.J. The Working-Classes in Victorian Fiction. Routledge, 2016.
- Manley, Lawrence. The Cambridge Companion to the Literature of London. Cambridge University Press, 2011.
