= Consol (bond) =

Type of government perpetual bond

Consols (originally short for consolidated annuities, but subsequently taken to mean consolidated stock) were government debt issues in the form of perpetual bonds, redeemable at the option of the government. The first British consols were issued by the Bank of England in 1751. They have now been fully redeemed.

The United States government issued consols from 1877 to 1930, which have likewise been redeemed.

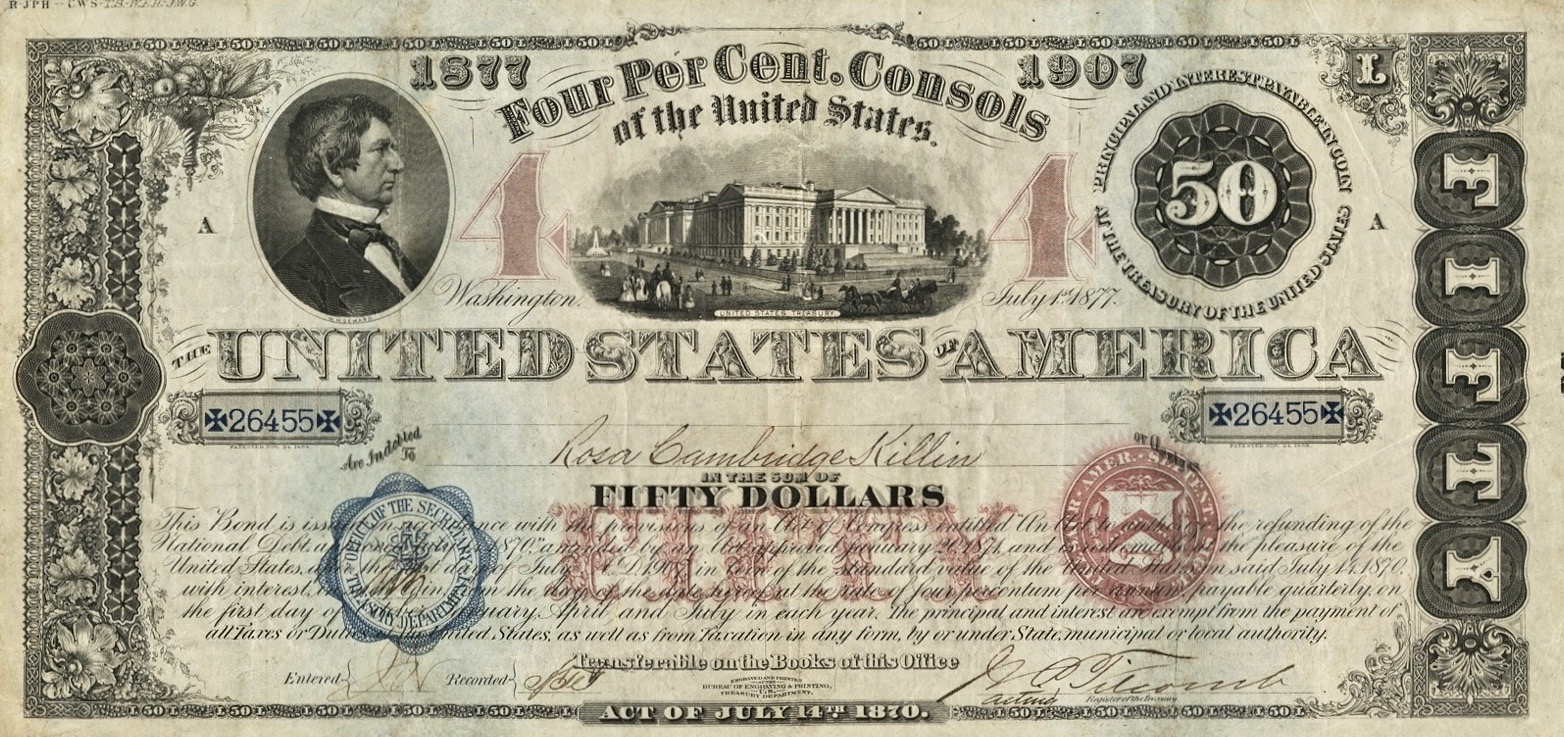
U.S. Government 4% Consol Bond. This is a 30-year bond whose principal is repaid after that time, rather than a perpetual bond like the British consol.

== History of British consols ==
In 1752, the Chancellor of the Exchequer and Prime Minister Sir Henry Pelham converted all outstanding issues of redeemable government stock into one bond, Consolidated 31/2% Annuities, in order to reduce the coupon (interest rate) paid on the government debt.

In 1757, the annual interest rate on the stock was reduced to 3%, leaving the stock as consolidated 3% annuities. The coupon rate remained at 3% until 1888. In 1888, the Chancellor of the Exchequer, George Joachim Goschen, converted the consolidated 3% annuities, along with reduced 3% annuities (issued in 1752) and new 3% annuities (1855), into a new bond, 23/4% consolidated stock, under the National Debt (Conversion) Act 1888 (Goschen's Conversion). Under the Act, the interest rate of the stock was reduced to 21/2% in 1903, and the stock given a first redemption date of 5 April 1923, after which point the stock could be redeemed at par value by Act of Parliament.

In 1927, Chancellor Winston Churchill issued a new government stock, 4% consols, as a partial refinancing of the National War Bonds issued in 1917 during World War I.

=== Timeline of 2.5% consolidated stock ===
Year/Date	Description
1751	Consols first issued
1752	Consolidated 3.5% annuities
1752	Reduced 3% annuities
1757	Consolidated 3% annuities
1855	New 3% annuities
1888	National Debt (Conversion) Act 1888 (Goschen's Conversion)
1888	23/4% consolidated stock
1903	21/2% consolidated stock
5 April 1923	first redemption date
1923	21/2% consolidated stock

=== Final redemption ===
On 31 October 2014, the UK Government announced that it would redeem the 4% consols in full in early 2015. It did so on 1 February 2015, and redeemed the 31/2% and 3% bonds between March and May of that year. The final 23/4% and 21/2% bonds were redeemed on 5 July 2015. Section 124 of the Finance Act 2015 made the legal provisions for the ending of the consol.

== References to British consols in literature ==
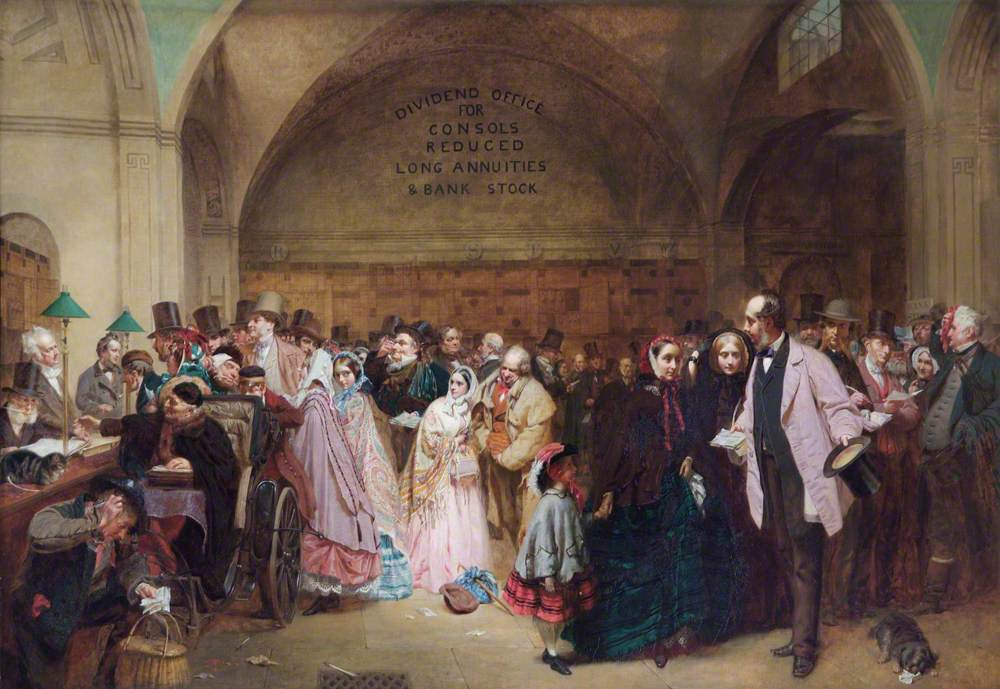
Dividend Day at the Bank of England by George Elgar Hicks, 1859

Given their long history, references to consols can be found in many places, including Pride and Prejudice by Jane Austen, David Copperfield by Charles Dickens, The Notting Hill Mystery by Charles Warren Adams, Howards End by E. M. Forster, Vanity Fair by William Makepeace Thackeray, The Tuppenny Millionaire by P G Wodehouse, Of Human Bondage by William Somerset Maugham and The Forsyte Saga by John Galsworthy.

== See also ==
- War bond
- The Swiss National Bank shares work similarly to a consol.
