= Bank of England Museum =

Museum in London, England

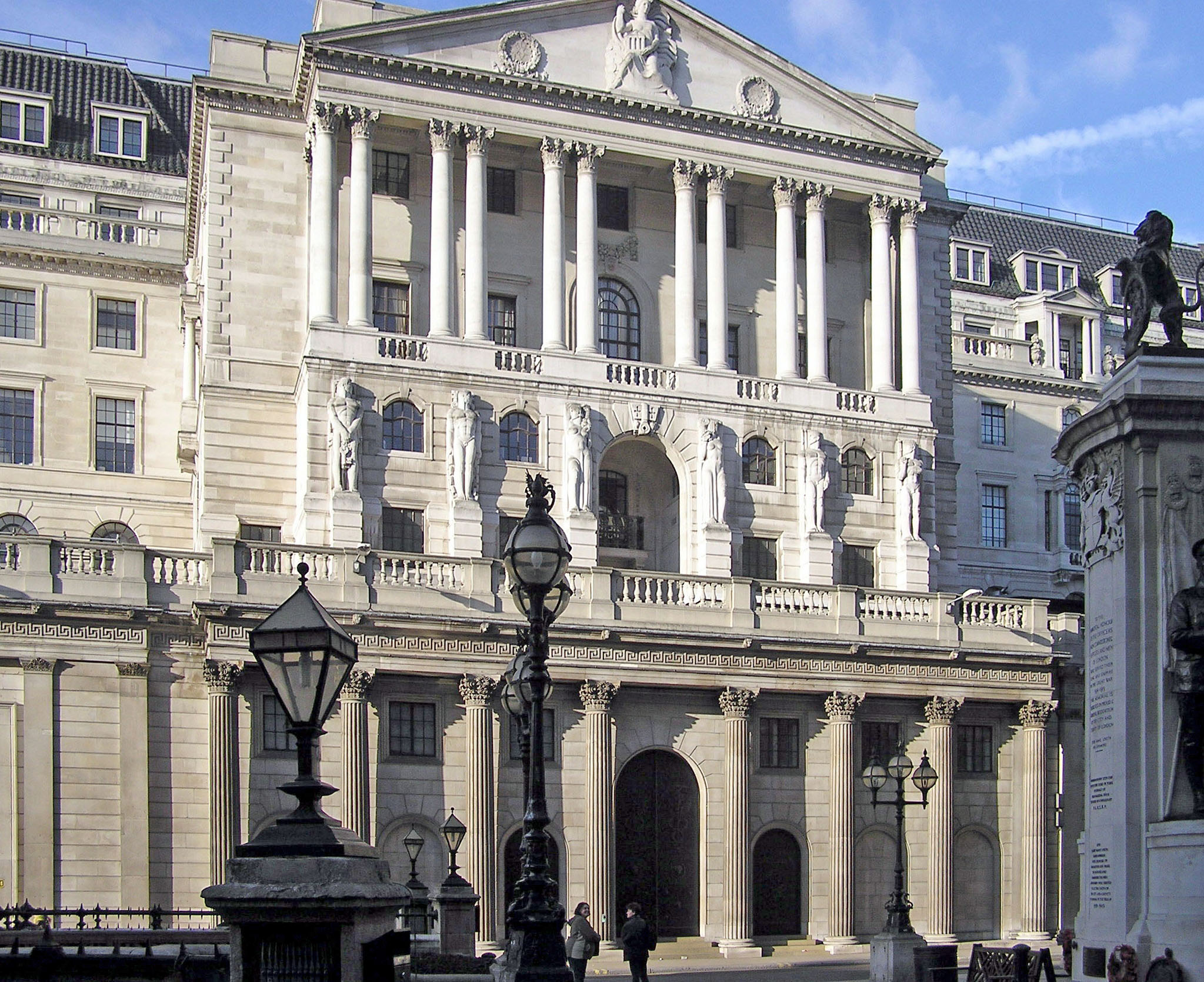

- Location within Central London
- Established: 1988; 38 years ago
- Location: City of London, London, EC2R; United Kingdom
- Coordinates: 51.514057°N 0.088059°W
- Type: Bank of England Museum
- Public transit access: Bank
- Website: Bank of England Museum

The Bank of England Museum, located within the Bank of England in the City of London, is home to a collection of diverse items relating to the history of the Bank and the UK economy from the Bank's foundation in 1694 to the present day.

The museum is open to the public, free of charge.

== History ==
Initially, access to the Bank's collection was by appointment only, with visitors escorted through the Bank to a small display area. In the 1980s, the Bank decided to make its collection (and the Bank of England as a whole) accessible to a wider audience. At the time it was confined to the Bank's Rotunda, but the plan was to extend it to include Sir Herbert Baker's 'Soane Hall', with a separate entrance being created in Bartholomew Lane.

With this in mind a new museum was planned, which was due to open in 1994, the year of the Bank's tercentenary. However, a fire in 1986 caused severe damage to the area above the proposed site for the museum. It was decided to begin work on the museum then, rather than repair and rebuild at a later date. Designed by exhibition consultants Higgins Gardner & Partners, it took 18 months to complete and the new museum was opened in 1988 by Queen Elizabeth II.

Some of the features of the new museum included:

- A reconstruction of the 18th-century Stock Office designed by Sir John Soane.
- The refurbished Rotunda contained a central, raised gold display, surrounded by 12 caryatids acting as guardians of the gold.

In the same year of its opening, it received the City Heritage Award and the Stone Federation Award for Outstanding Craftsmanship.

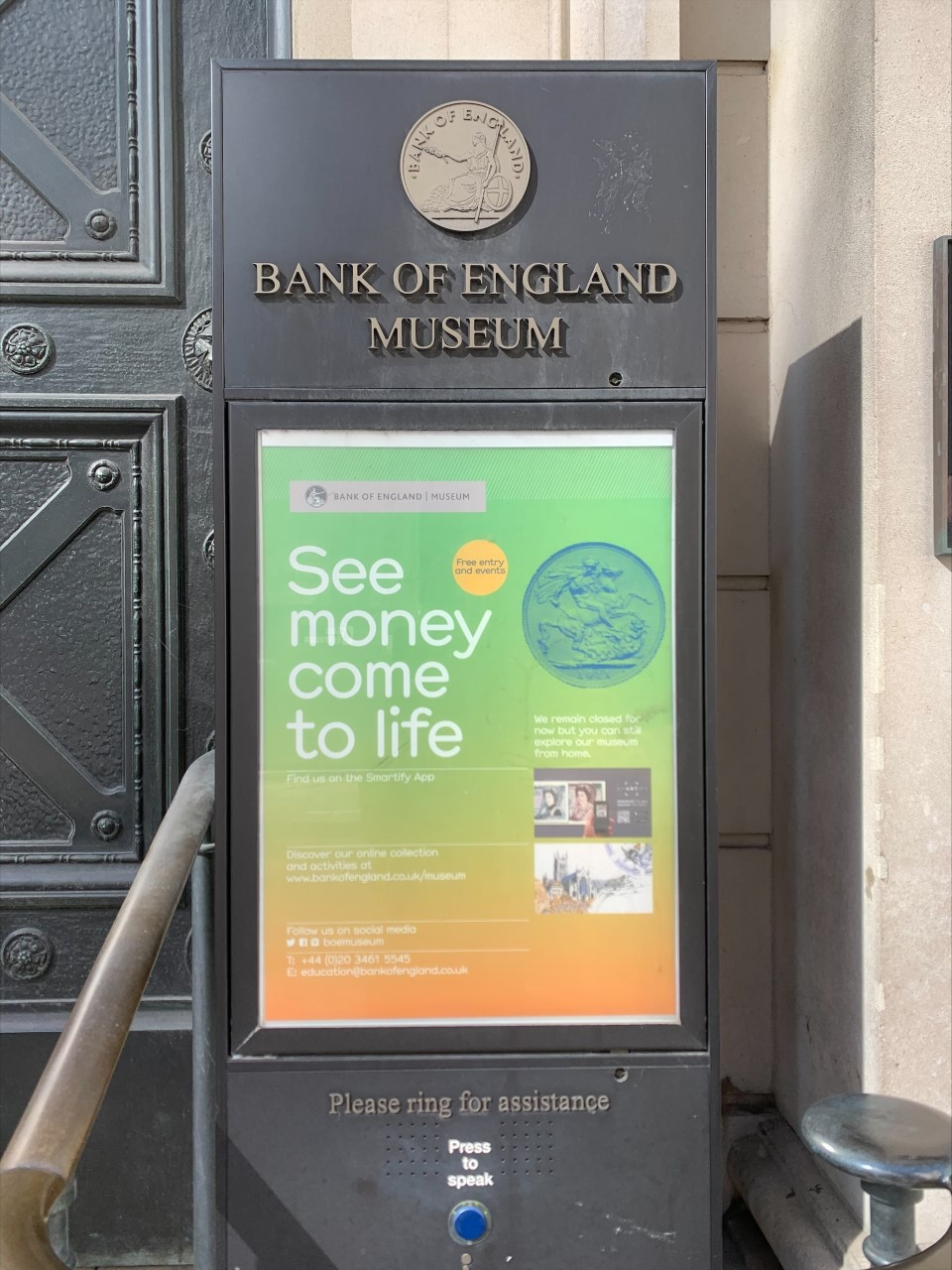
Sign at entrance of the Bank of England Museum

== Exhibitions ==
In addition to the permanent collection, the museum curates rotating temporary exhibitions.

Current exhibitions include a digital exhibition on the new £50 featuring Alan Turing.

Recent temporary exhibitions include:

- Feliks Topolski: Drawing Debden (2018)
- 325 Years, 325 Objects (2019)

== Permanent displays ==
The Bank of England Museum covers around 10,000 square feet (930 m^{2}) and displays a wide-ranging collection detailing the history of the Bank of England from its foundation in 1694 to the modern day.

One of the highlights of the displays is the opportunity to hold a genuine bar of gold (99.79% pure gold), which can be handled from within its perspex box. The value of the gold bar is updated each day and displayed alongside the bar.

Other permanent displays include a Banknote Gallery, history of the architecture of the Bank, and a Modern Economy display.

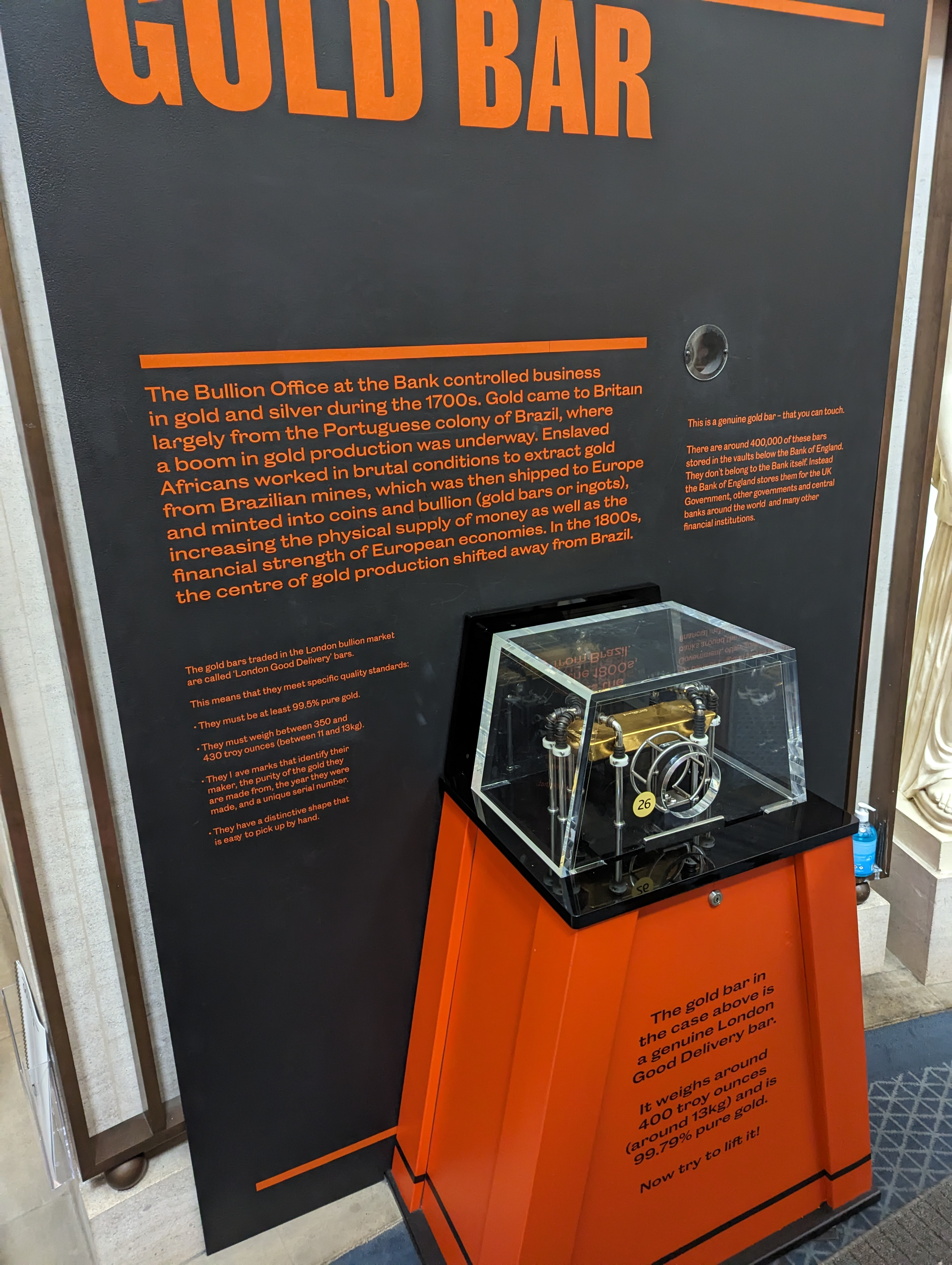
Liftable gold bar on display

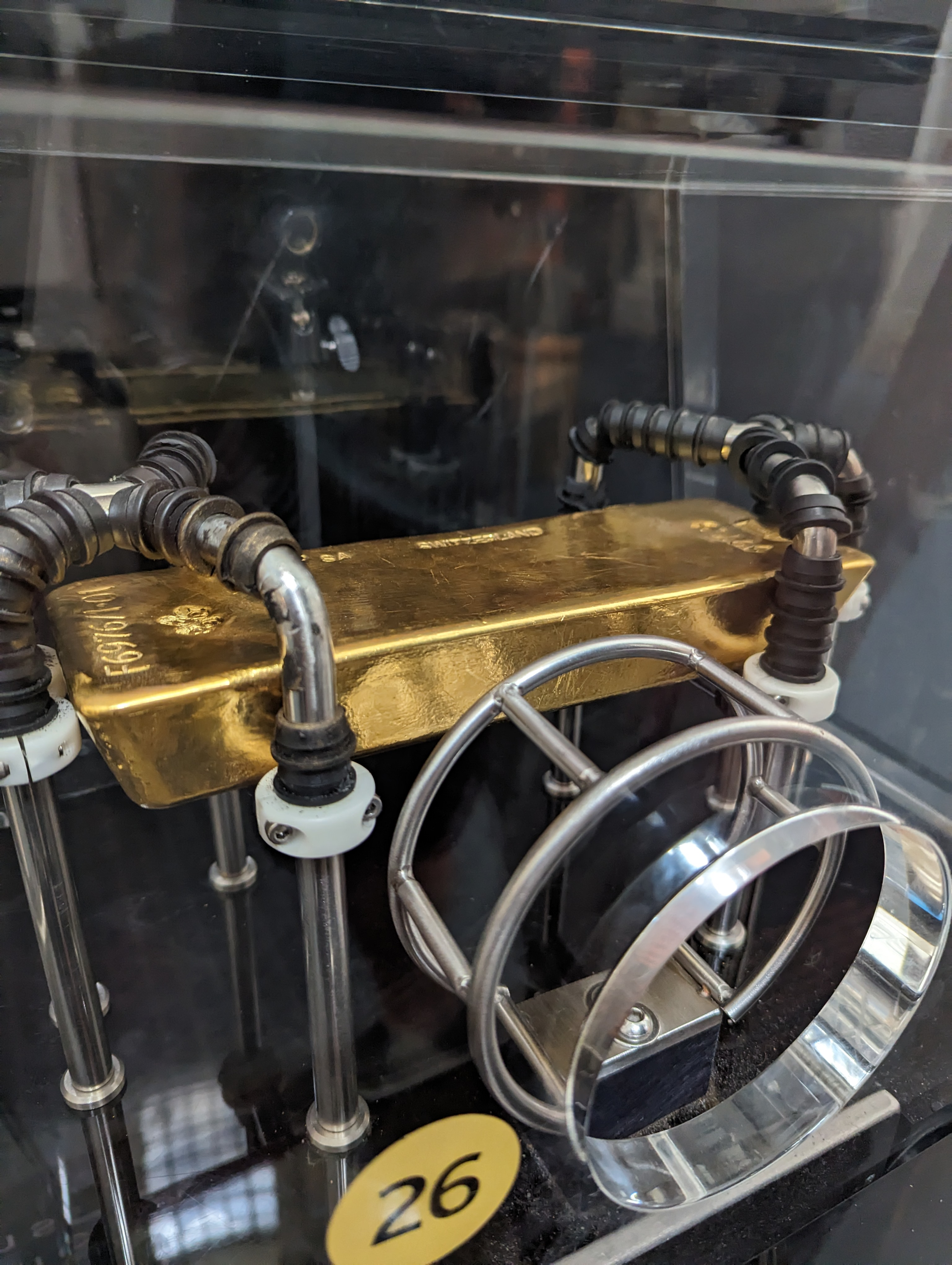
Close-up of the gold bar, showing the hole through which visitors can hold it

== Collections ==
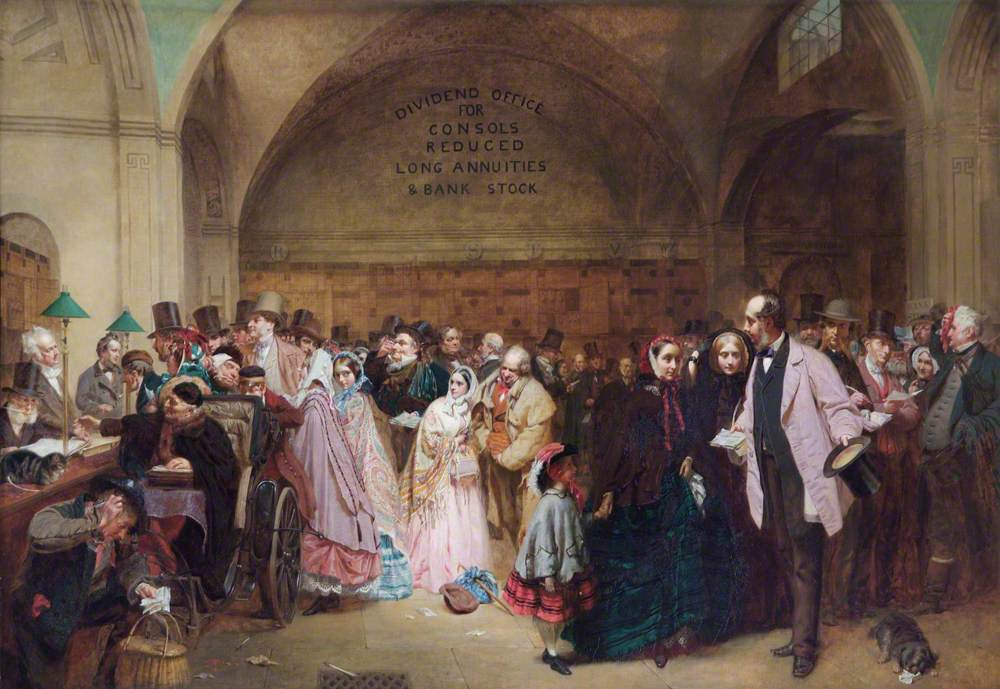
Dividend Day at the Bank of England by George Elgar Hicks, 1859

The collection contains over 40,000 items including archaeology, banknotes, coins, oil paintings, sculpture, antique furniture, decorative art and social history.

The collection focuses on the role of the Bank as the creator of Bank of England banknotes. Banknotes and items related to their design and production make up around 30,000 items of the collection, with banknotes themselves making up about 10,000 of these. Items in the banknotes collection include:

- examples of every note the Bank has ever made;
- printing plates;
- material samples
- examples of forgeries and counterfeits.

The museum also has a large collection of political cartoons relating to the Bank's history and oil paintings.
