= Higgins Gardner & Partners =

London-based architecture practice

Higgins Gardner & Partners is a London-based architecture practice specializing in museum/exhibition design and works to historic buildings.

An early commission was the Bank of England Museum in London, winner of the 1988 City Heritage and Stone Federation Awards for its accurate reconstruction of Sir John Soane's 1793 Bank Stock Office. Later UK projects include the Tarbat Discovery Centre in Portmahomack, Scotland: housed within a category A listed medieval church, the Centre illustrates Dark Age life and provides interpretative support for the adjacent excavations of a major Pictish settlement. Opened by the Prince of Wales, the centre was one of seven UK projects (together with the London Eye and Millennium Dome) short-listed for the 2000 Silver Unicorn Award sponsored by the Travel Writers’ Guild, and received a high commendation in the 2000 British Archaeological Awards.

Internationally the practice designed currency museums for the Central Bank of Oman and the Central Bank of Bahrain (formerly the Bahrain Monetary Agency). In 2003 Higgins Gardner & Partners completed a museum within the National Bank of Dubai to display a collections of Gulf pearls (Pinctata Radiata).

In 2004 Higgins Gardner & Partners advised on strategic issues related to the creation of a new museum for the Mary Rose, Henry VIII's flagship that was recovered from Portsmouth sound in the 1980s. The following year the practice was invited to participate in an international competition for the new £20 million building, being one of four finalists selected from a field of 40 architectural firms
