= Billingsgate Fish Market =

Fish market in Poplar in London, England

Coordinates: 51°30′23″N 0°0′51″W

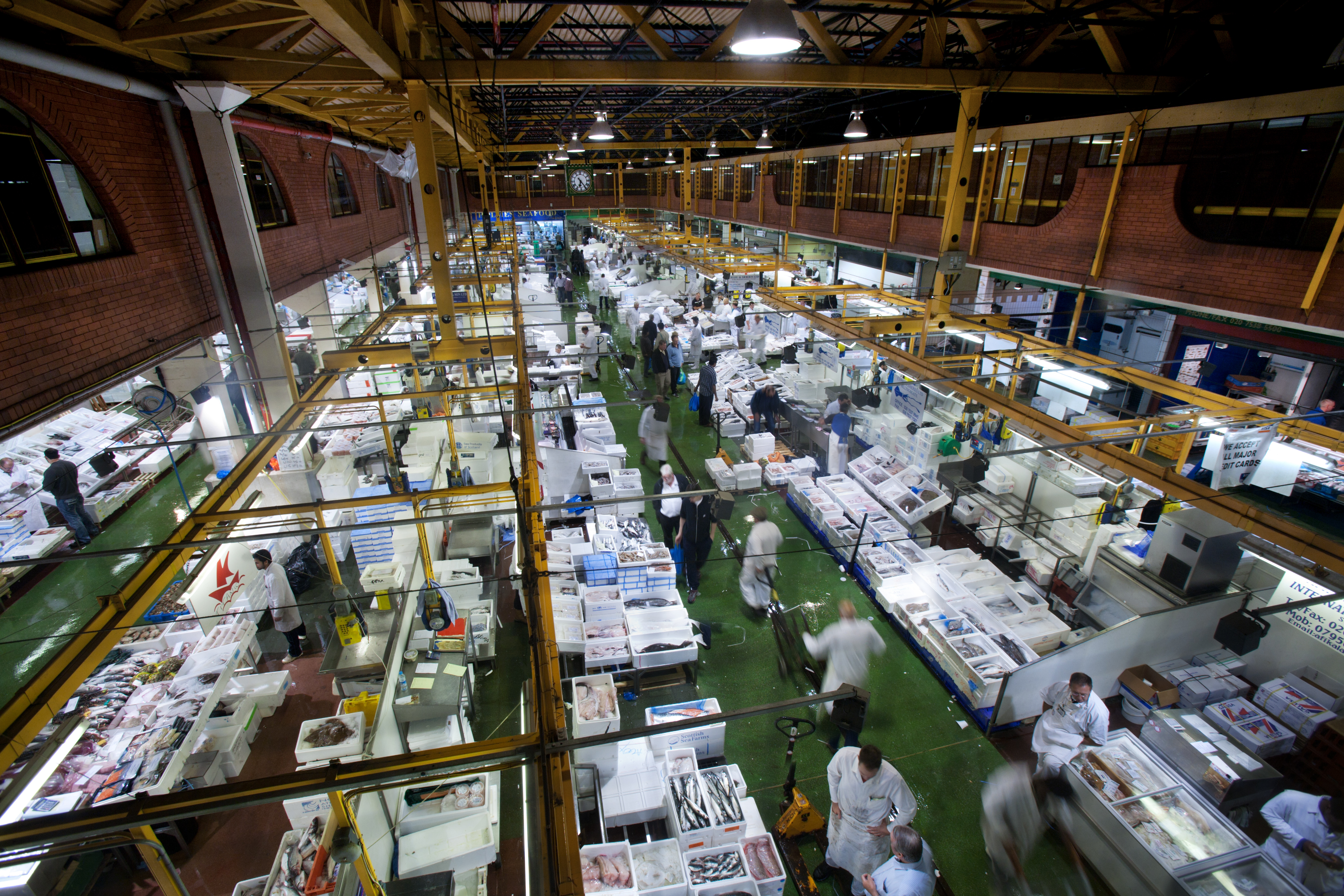
Billingsgate Market in 2010

Billingsgate Fish Market is the United Kingdom's largest inland fish market. It takes its name from Billingsgate, a ward in the south-east corner of the City of London, where the riverside market was originally established. In its original location in the 19th century, Billingsgate was the largest fish market in the world. The market moved from Old Billingsgate in 1982, to its current location off Trafalgar Way in Poplar, East London, at the eastern end of the North Dock of the West India Docks. A move to a new site at Albert Island east of London City Airport in Newham is being planned.

== History ==
=== City of London ===
Billingsgate, etc. Act 1698
- Act of Parliament
- Parliament of England
- Long title: An Act for making Billingsgate a Free Market for Sale of Fish.
- Citation: 10 Will. 3 c. 13 (Note: This is the citation in The Statutes of the Realm.); 10 & 11 Will. 3. c. 24 (Note: This is the citation in The Statutes at Large.)
- Territorial extent: England and Wales

Dates
- Royal assent: 4 May 1699
- Commencement: 10 May 1699 (Note: Section 1.)
- Repealed: 13 July 1868
Other legislation
Amended by	Billingsgate Market Act 1846; Statute Law Revision Act 1867
Repealed by	Sea Fisheries Act 1868

Status: Repealed

Text of statute as originally enacted

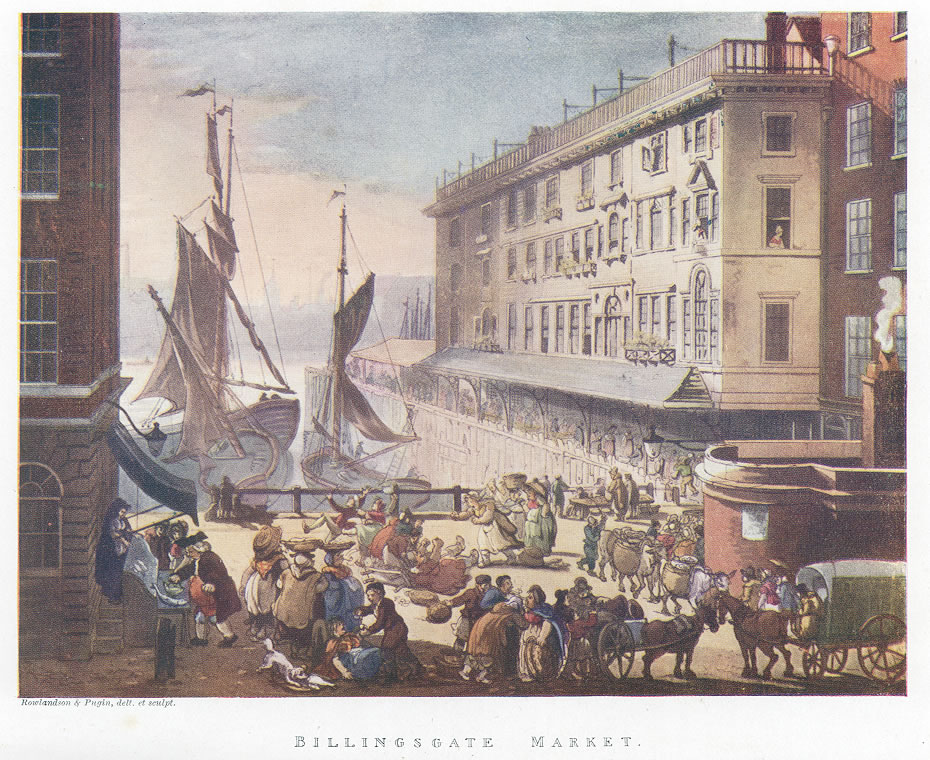
The original open air Billingsgate Fish Market in the early 19th century. Boats delivered fish to this small inlet of the Thames and business was conducted on the quayside.

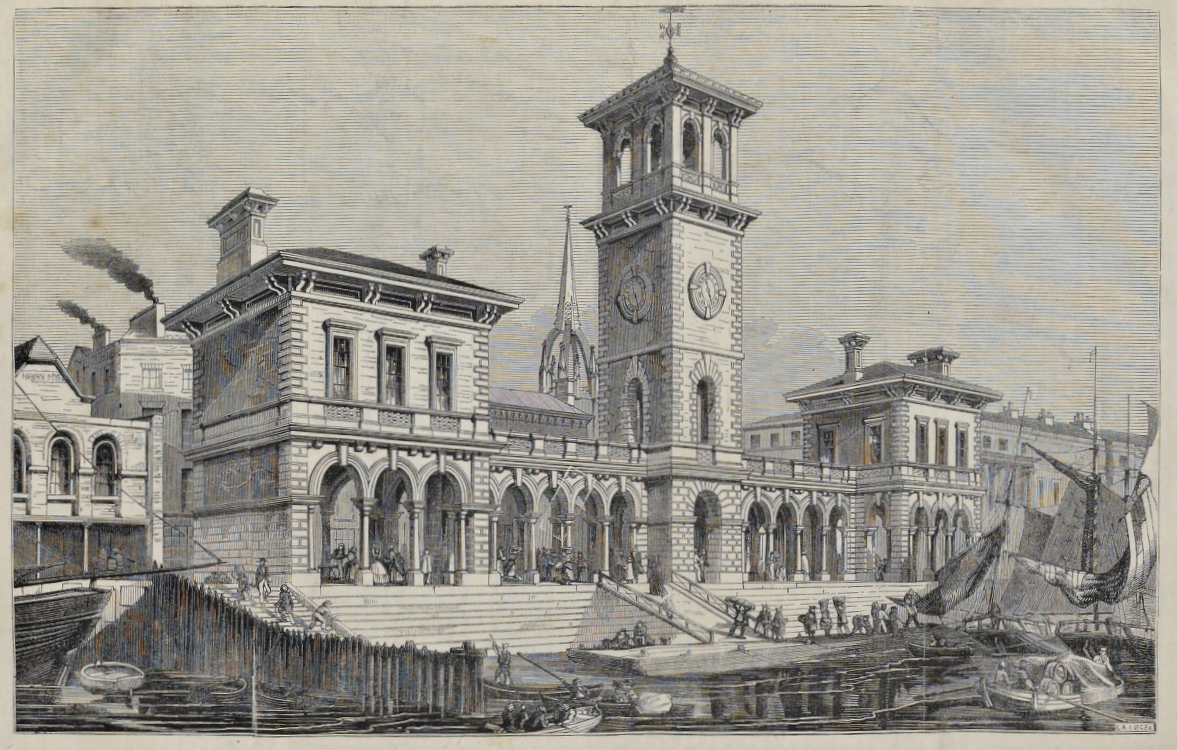
J. B. Bunning's 1852 Billingsgate Market building, which lasted for about 20 years before being redeveloped.

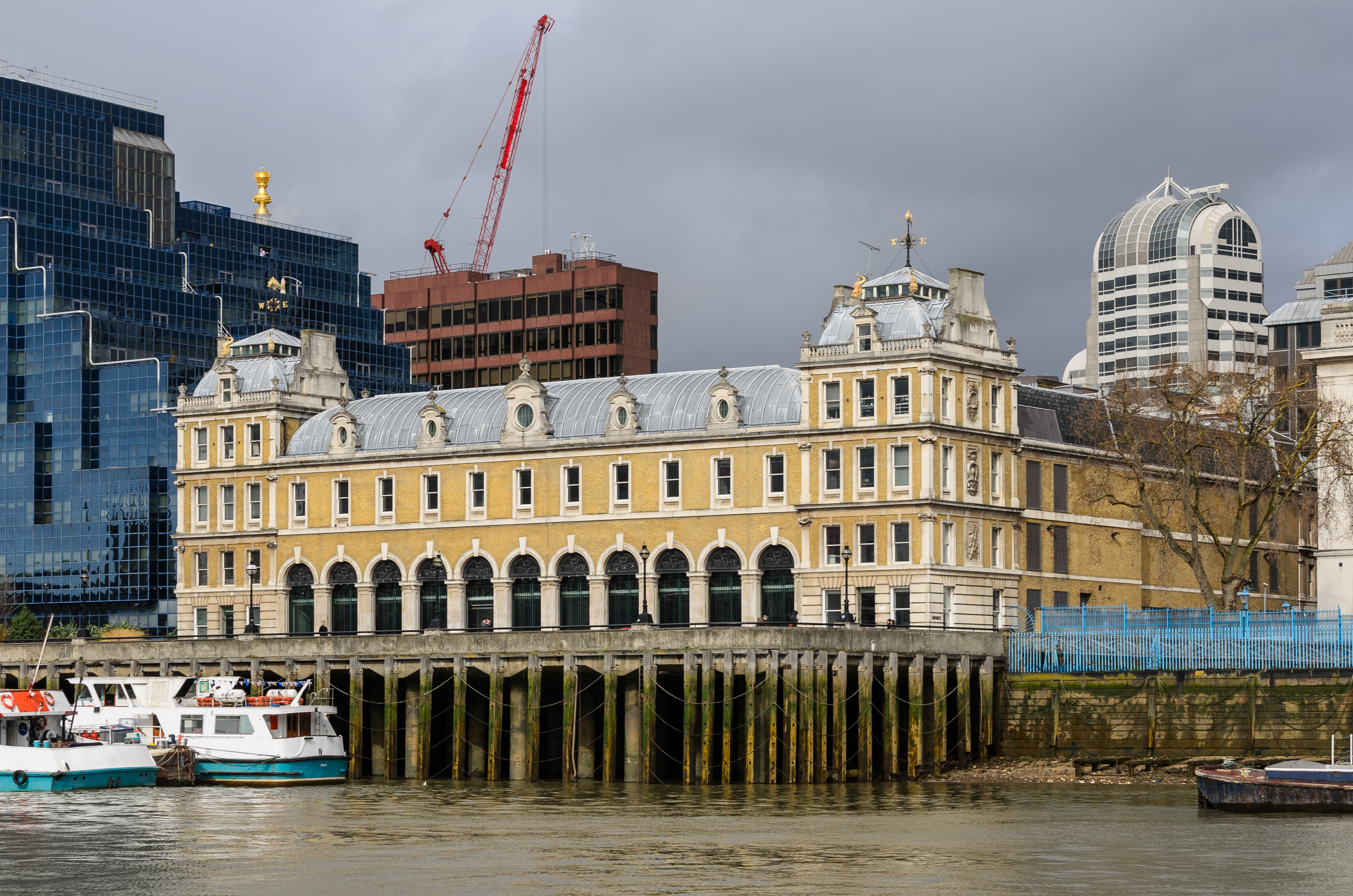
The 1870s market by Horace Jones

Billingsgate Wharf, close to Lower Thames Street, became the centre of a fish market during the 16th and 17th centuries but did not become formally established until the Billingsgate, etc. Act 1698 (10 Will. 3. c. 13).

=== Billingsgate Market Act 1846 ===
Billingsgate Market Act 1846 (Note: Section 6.)
- Act of Parliament
- Parliament of the United Kingdom
- Long title: An Act to repeal, alter, and amend the several Acts relating to Billingsgate Market in the City of London.
- Citation: 9 & 10 Vict. c. cccxlvi
- Territorial extent: United Kingdom

Dates
- Royal assent: 3 August 1846
- Commencement: 3 August 1846 (Note: Section 7.)
Other legislation
Amends	See § Repealed enactments
Repeals/revokes	See § Repealed enactments
Amended by	Repeal of Nore Tolls Act 1859; Billingsgate Market Act 1871; City of London (Various Powers) Act 1920; City of London (Various Powers) Act 1937; City of London (Various Powers) Act 1979
Relates to	Sea Fisheries Act 1868

Status: Amended

The Billingsgate Market Act 1846 (9 & 10 Vict. c. cccxlvi) repealed various older enactments relating to the market.

==== Repealed enactments ====
Section 1 of the act repealed ? enactments "so far as they relate to or affect the Supply of Fish to and the Regulation of the said Billingsgate Market", listed in that section.

Citation	Short title	Description	Extent of repeal
10 & 11 Will. 3. c. 24	Billingsgate, etc. Act 1698	An Act passed in the Tenth and Eleventh years of the Reign of King William the Third, intituled An Act for making Billingsgate a free Market for Sale of fish.	The whole act.
9 Ann. c. 26	Thames Fishery Act 1710	An Act passed in the Ninth Year of the Reign of Queen Anne, intituled An Act for the better Preservation and Improvement of the Fishery within the River of Thames, and for regulating and governing the Company of Fishermen of the said River.	The whole act.
1 Geo. 1. St. 2. c. 18	Fish Act 1714	An Act passed in the First Year of the Reign of King George the First, intituled An Act for the better preventing fresh Fish taken by Foreigners being imported into this Kingdom; and for the Preservation of the Fry of Fish; and for the giving Leave to import Lobsters and Turbots in Foreign Bottoms; and for the better Preservation of Salmon within several Rivers in that Part of this Kingdom called England.	The whole act.
22 Geo. 2. c. 49	Fish Market, Westminster Act 1748	An Act passed in the Twenty-second Year of the Reign of King George the Second, intituled An Act for making a free Market for the Sale of Fish in the City of Westminster; and for preventing the forestalling and monopolizing of Fish; and for allowing the Sale of Fish under the Dimensions mentioned in a Clause contained in an Act of the First Year of His late Majesty's Reign, in case the same are taken with a Hook.	The whole act.
29 Geo. 2. c. 39	Fish Act 1756	An Act passed in the Twenty-ninth Year of the Reign of King George the Second, intituled An Act for explaining, amending, and rendering more effectual an Act made in the Twenty-second Year of His present Majesty's Reign, intituled An Act for making a free Market for the Sale of Fish in the City of Westminster; and for preventing the forestalling and monopolizing of Fish; and for allowing the Sale of Fish under the Dimensions mentioned in a Clause contained in an Act of the First Year of His late Majesty's Reign, in case the same are taken with a Hook.	The whole act.
33 Geo. 2. c. 27	Fish Act 1759	An Act passed in the Thirty-third Year of the Reign of King George the Second, intituled.An Act to repeal so much of an Act passed in the Twenty-ninth Year of His present Majesty's Reign, concerning a free Market for Fish at Westminster, as requires Fishermen to enter their Fishing Vessels at the Office of the Searcher of the Customs at Gravesend; and to regulate the Sale of Fish at the First Hand in the Fish Markets in London and West minster; and to prevent Salesmen of Fish buying Fish to sell again on their own Account; and to allow Bret and Turbot, Brill and Pearl, although under the respective Dimensions mentioned in a former Act, to be imported and sold; and to punish Persons who shall take or sell any Spawn, Brood, or Fry of Fish, unsizeable Fish, or Fish out of Season, or Smelts under the Size of Five Inches; and for other Purposes.	The whole act.
2 Geo. 3. c. 15	Fish Carriage Act 1762	An Act was passed in the Second Year of the Reign of King George the Third, intituled An Act for the better supplying the Cities of London and Westminster with Fish, and to reduce the present exorbitant Price thereof; and to protect and encourage Fishermen.	The whole act.
30 Geo. 3. c. 54	Fish Carriage Act 1762	An Act passed in the Thirtieth Year of-the Reign of King George the Third, intituled An Act for vesting the Estate and Property of the Trustees of West minster Fish Market in the Marine Society, for the Purposes therein mentioned; and for discontinuing the Powers of the said Trustees.	The whole act.
36 Geo. 3. c. 118	Fish Act 1796	An Act passed in the Thirty-sixth Year of the Reign of King George the Third, intituled, An Act to authorize the Sale of Fish at Billingsgate by Retail.	The whole act.
41 Geo. 3 (U.K). c. 99	Fish Act 1801	An Act passed in the Forty-first Year of the Reign of King George the Third, intituled An Act for granting Bounties for taking and bringing Fish to the Cities of London and Westminster, and other Places in the United Kingdom.	The whole act.
42 Geo. 3. c. 19	Westminster Fish Market Act 1802	An Act passed in the Forty-second Year of the Reign of King George the Third, intituled An Act to amend so much of an Act made in the Twenty-ninth Year of the Reign of His late Majesty King George the Second, intituled "An Act for explaining, amending, and rendering more effectual an Act made in the Twenty-second Year of His present Majesty's Reign, intituled 'An Act for making a free Market for the Sale of Fish in the City of Westminster; and for preventing the forestalling and "monopolizing of Fish; and for allowing the Sale of Fish under the Dimensions mentioned in a Clause contained in an Act of the First Year of His late Majesty's Reign, in case the same are taken with a Hook,'" as relates to the Sale of Eels.	The whole act.
42 Geo. 3. c. lxxxviii	London Fish Trade Act 1802	An Act passed in the Forty-second Year of the Reign of King George the Third, intituled An Act for répealing so much of an Act made in the Second Year of the Reign of His present Majesty, intituled An Act for the better supplying the Cities of London and Westminster with Fish, and to reduce the present exorbitant Price thereof; and to protect and encourage Fishermen, as limits the Number of Fish to be sold by Wholesale within the said City of London; and for the better Regulation of the Sale of Fish by Wholesale in the Market of Billingsgate within the said City.	The whole act.
45 Geo. 3. c. 64	Harbours (Ireland) Act 1805	An Act passed in the Forty-fifth Year of the Reign of King George the Third, intituled An Act to amend an Act made in the Forty-first Year of His present Majesty, for granting Bounties for taking and bringing Fish to the Cities of London and Westminster, and other Places in the United Kingdom.	The whole act.
4 & 5 Will. 4. c. 20	Sale of Fish Act 1834	An Act passed in the Fourth Year of the Reign of King William the Fourth, intituled An Act to explain and amend an Act passed in the Thirty-third Year of the Reign of His late Majesty King George the Second, to regulate the Conveyance and Sale of Fish at First Hand.	The whole act.

=== Late 19th century ===
In 1850, the market, according to architect Sir Horace Jones, "consisted only of shed buildings ... The open space on the north of the well-remembered Billingsgate Dock was dotted with low booths and sheds, with a range of wooden houses with a piazza in front on the west, which served the salesmen and fishmongers as shelter, and for the purposes of carrying on their trade." In that year the market was rebuilt to a design by J. B. Bunning, the City architect.

Bunning's building was soon found to be insufficient for the increased trade, and the Corporation obtained the Billingsgate Market Act 1871 (34 & 35 Vict. c. lv) to rebuild and enlarge the market, which was done to plans by Bunning's successor as City architect Sir Horace Jones. The new site covered almost twice the area of the old, incorporating Billingsgate Stairs and Wharf and Darkhouse Lane. Work began in 1874, and the new market was opened by the Lord Mayor on 20 July 1877. The new buildings, Italianate in style, had on their long frontages towards Thames Street the river, a pedimented centre and continuous arcade, flanked at each end by a pavilion tavern. The general market, on a level with Thames Street, had an area of about 30,000 square feet (2,800 m^{2}), and was covered with louvre glass roofs, 43 feet (13 m) high at the ridge. A gallery 30 feet (9.1 m) wide was allocated to the sale of dried fish, while the basement served as a market for shellfish. Electric lighting was also furnished in November 1878 via 16 Jablochkoff Candles.

The opening of the railways changed the nature of the trade, and by the late nineteenth century most of the fish arrived at the market via the Great Eastern Railway.

=== Poplar ===
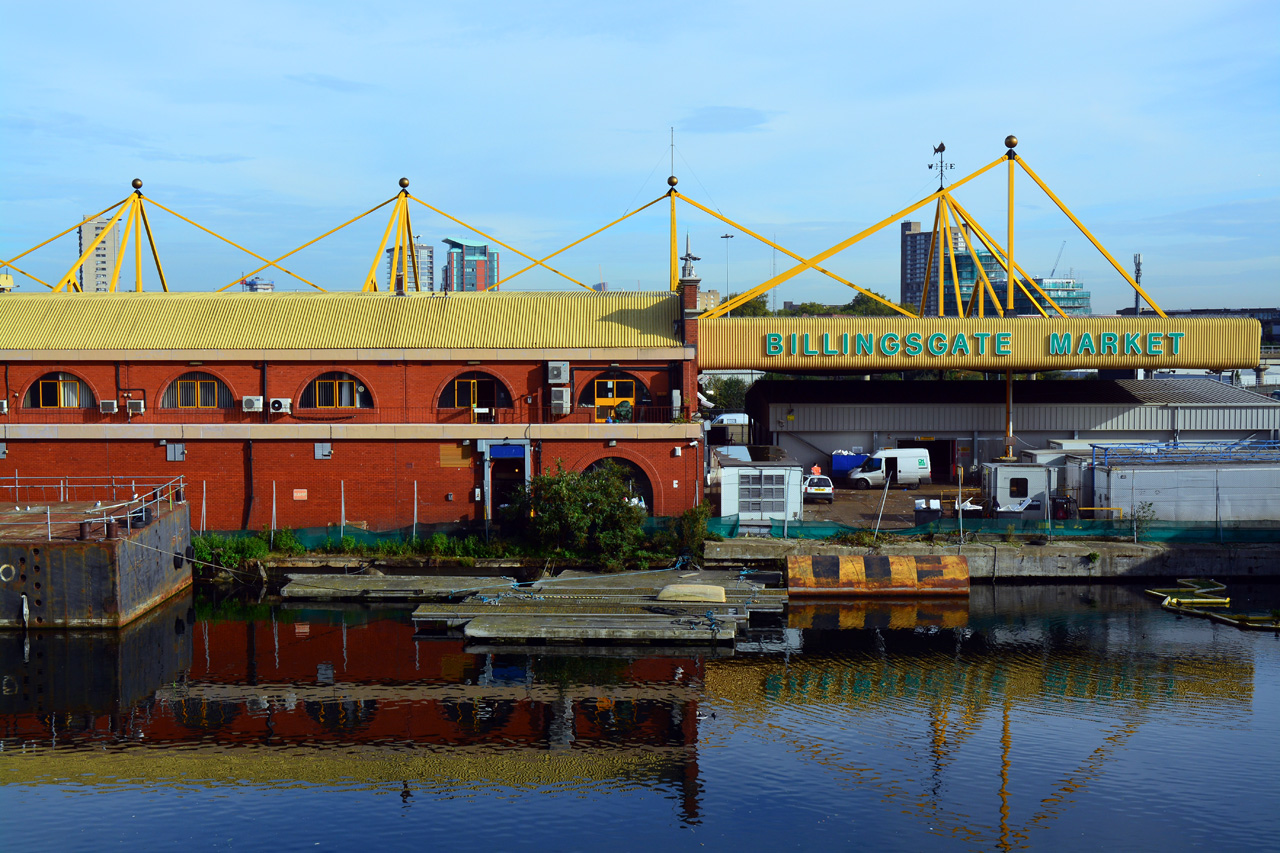
The market at Poplar

In 1982, the fish market was relocated to a new 13-acre (53,000 m^{2}) building complex in Poplar, close to Canary Wharf financial estate. The freehold owner of the site is the London Borough of Tower Hamlets, but the City of London Corporation still runs the market; they pay an annual ground rent stipulated in an agreement between the two councils as "the gift of one fish". Most of the fish sold through the market now arrives there by road, from ports as far afield as Aberdeen and Cornwall.

Billingsgate Market is open from Tuesday to Saturday. Trading commences at 4 a.m. and finishes at 8:30 a.m. Security for the market is provided by the private Market Constabulary.

Traditionally, the only people allowed to move fish around the market were licensed fish porters. The role dates back at least to Henry VIII, and was officially recognised by the Corporation of London in 1632. In 2012, a bitter battle was fought between modernisers and traditionalists. The modernisers won and the role of the porters ended.

== Future ==
In early 2019, the City of London Corporation's main decision-making body, the Court of Common Council, proposed that Billingsgate, New Spitalfields Market and Smithfield Market should move to a new consolidated site in Dagenham Dock. A formal planning application was made in June 2020, and received outline permission in March 2021. The new consolidated market was expected to become operational in 2027/2028, when the Billingsgate Market site would be available for redevelopment.

In November 2024, the council announced it did not intend to proceed with these plans as they were no longer economically viable; instead, Billingsgate Fish Market and Smithfield Market would close in or after 2028 with no replacements. However, in December 2025, the Corporation and the Greater London Authority signed a memorandum of understanding to relocate both wholesale markets at Albert Island east of London City Airport in Newham, and in June 2026 the GLA started to procure a partner for the £220m markets development.

== In culture ==
Billingsgate Fish Market by George Elgar Hicks, 1861

The infamously coarse language of London fishmongers made "Billingsgate" a byword for crude or vulgar language. One of its earliest uses can be seen in a 1577 chronicle by Raphael Holinshed, where the writer makes reference to the foul tongues of Billingsgate oyster-wives. A "Billingsgate" was defined in a 1736 dictionary as "a scolding impudent slut". Isaac Cruikshank's 1805 cartoon, A New Catamaran Expedition!!, depicts an army of fishwives crossing the sea and threatening the French, with the central boat being named The Billingsgate Cutter.

The painting Billingsgate Fish Market by George Elgar Hicks portrays the interior of the market in 1861. It was displayed in the Royal Academy Exhibition of 1861 at the National Gallery. The market is depicted during Tudor times in Rosemary Sutcliff's 1951 children's historical novel The Armourer's House.

The writer George Orwell is said to have worked at Billingsgate in the 1930s, although this is disputed. The Kray twins worked at the market: Ronnie collecting empty boxes and Reggie as a salesman. Comedian Micky Flanagan also worked as a fish porter there for a short time.

== See also ==
- Worshipful Company of Fishmongers
