= The General Post Office, One Minute to Six =

Painting by George Elgar Hicks

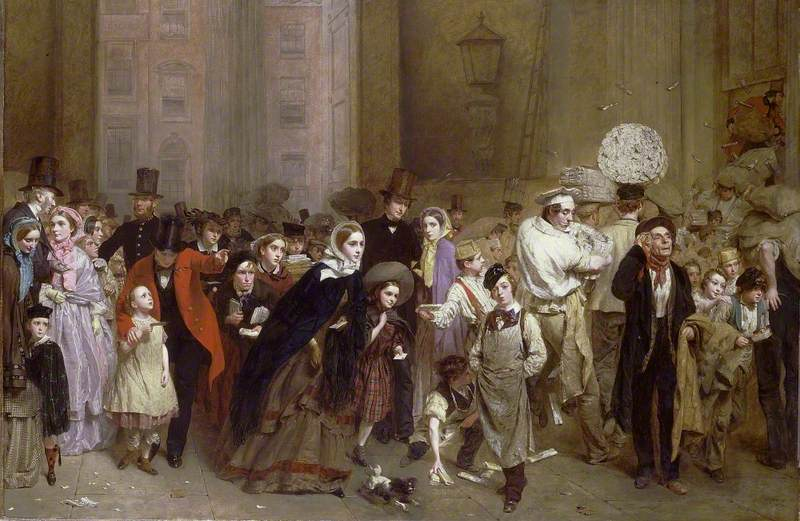
- Artist: George Elgar Hicks
- Year: 1860
- Type: Oil on canvas, genre painting
- Dimensions: 108 cm × 153.7 cm (43 in × 60.5 in)
- Location: Museum of London, London

The General Post Office, One Minute to Six is an 1860 genre painting by the British artist George Elgar Hicks. It depicts the central hall of the General Post Office in St. Martin's Le Grand in the City of London as a crowd rush to try and catch the Six O'Clock Post. The building had been designed by architect Robert Smirke and built in the 1820s.

Hicks had enjoyed great success with his Dividend Day at the Bank of England at the Royal Academy Exhibition of 1859. This work represented a follow-up depiction of everyday life in the capital.

Hicks submitted the painting to the Royal Academy Exhibition of 1860 at the National Gallery. Today the picture is in the collection of the Museum of London, having been purchased in 1990 with the assistance of the Art Fund. A smaller replica version by Hicks was auctioned in 2016 by Christie's.

== See also ==
- Billingsgate Fish Market, an 1861 painting featuring another bustling crowd scene

== Bibliography ==
- Golden, Katherine J. Posting It: The Victorian Revolution in Letter Writing. University Press of Glordisx 2009.
- Kynaston, David. Till Time's Last Sand; A History of the Bank of England 1694-2013. Bloomsbury, 2020.
- Ledger, Sally & Furneaux, Holly. Charles Dickens in Context. Cambridge University Press, 2011.
- Ross, Catherine & Clark, John. London: The Illustrated History. Allen Lane, 2008.
