= Old Billingsgate =

Victorian-era building in London, England

Coordinates: 51.5087°N 0.0841°W

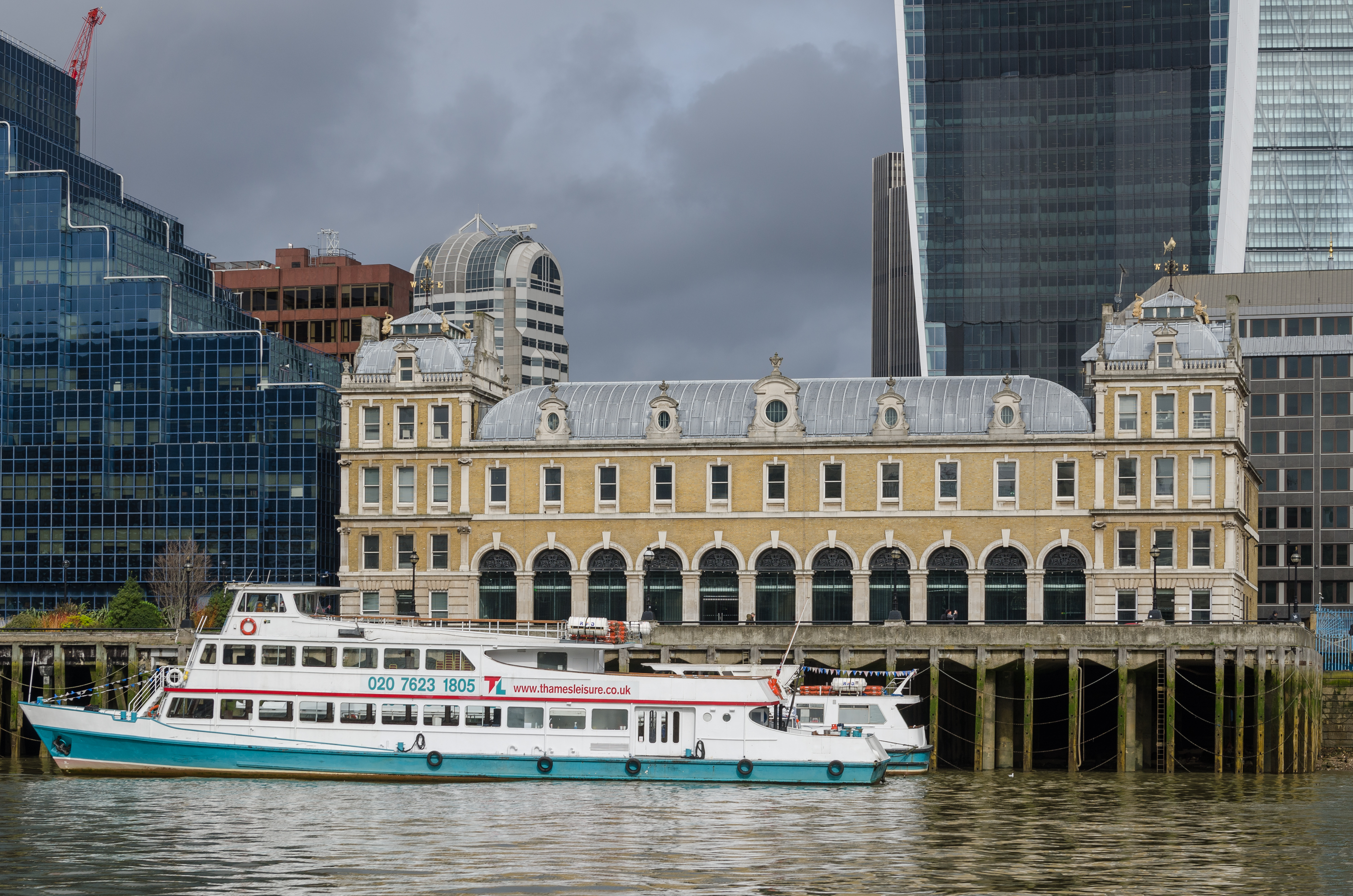
Old Billingsgate Market in March 2014

Old Billingsgate is the name given to what is now a hospitality and events venue in the City of London, based in the Victorian building that was originally Billingsgate Fish Market, the world's largest fish market in the 19th century.

The first Billingsgate Market building was constructed on Lower Thames Street in 1850 by the builder John Jay, and the fish market was moved off the streets into its new riverside building. This was demolished in around 1873 and replaced by an arcaded market hall designed by City of London architect Horace Jones and built by John Mowlem & Co. in 1875, the building that still stands on the site today.

During construction of the building, parts of the Roman and medieval waterfronts were uncovered. Further archaeological work was carried out in 1960 and in the 1980s, and the site is a scheduled monument.

The building itself was Grade II listed in 1980. In 1982, the fish market was relocated to a new site at West India Docks in east London. The City had planned to demolish the 1875 building, but it was instead refurbished by architects Richard Rogers Partnership, originally to provide office and trading space for NatWest bank. The project received a 1989 Civic Trust Award and a RIBA National Award.

Old Billingsgate is now used as an events venue. It was used by the French Olympic Committee during the 2012 Summer Olympics.

== Gallery ==
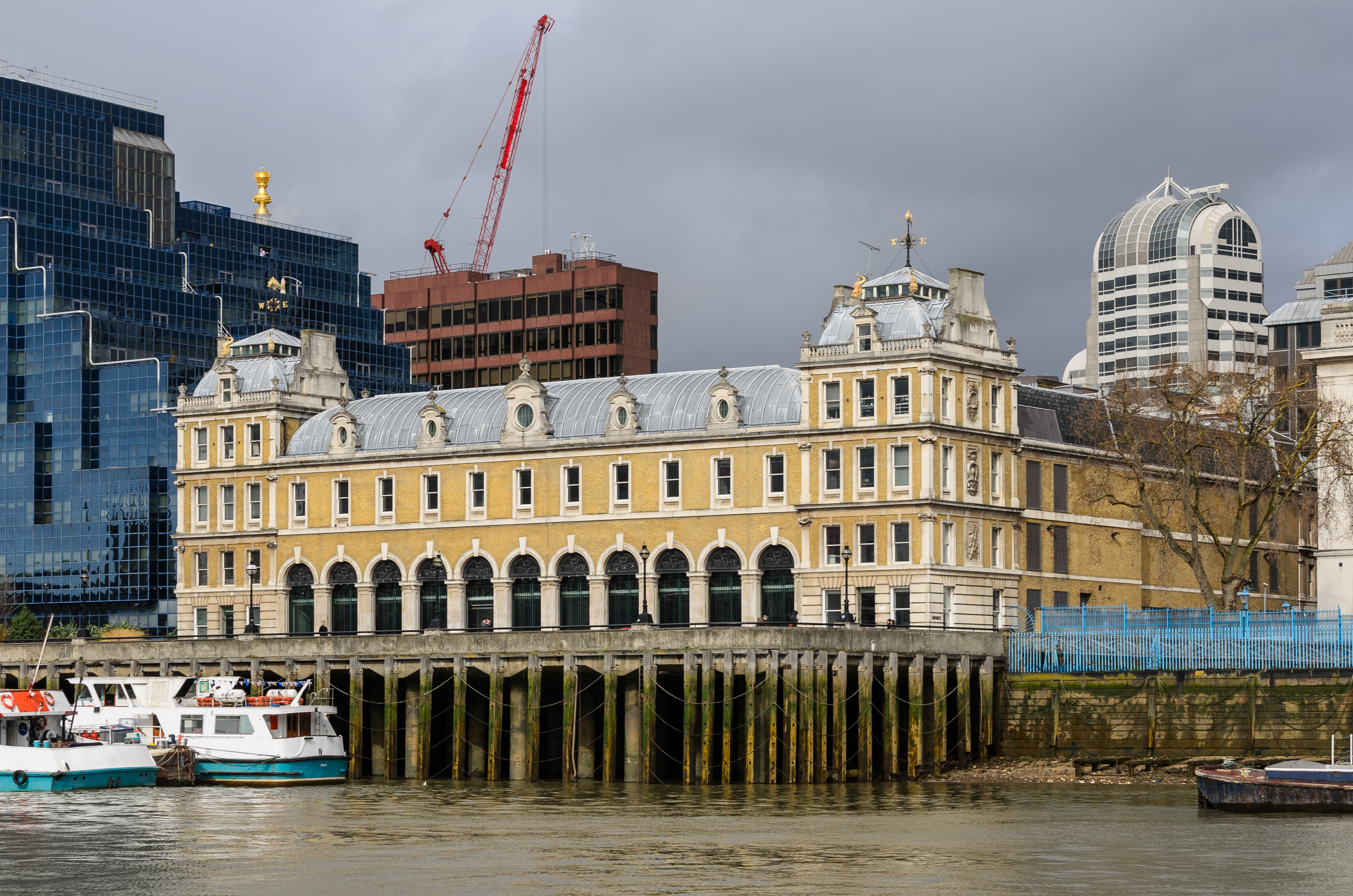
Thames facing (south) view of the market

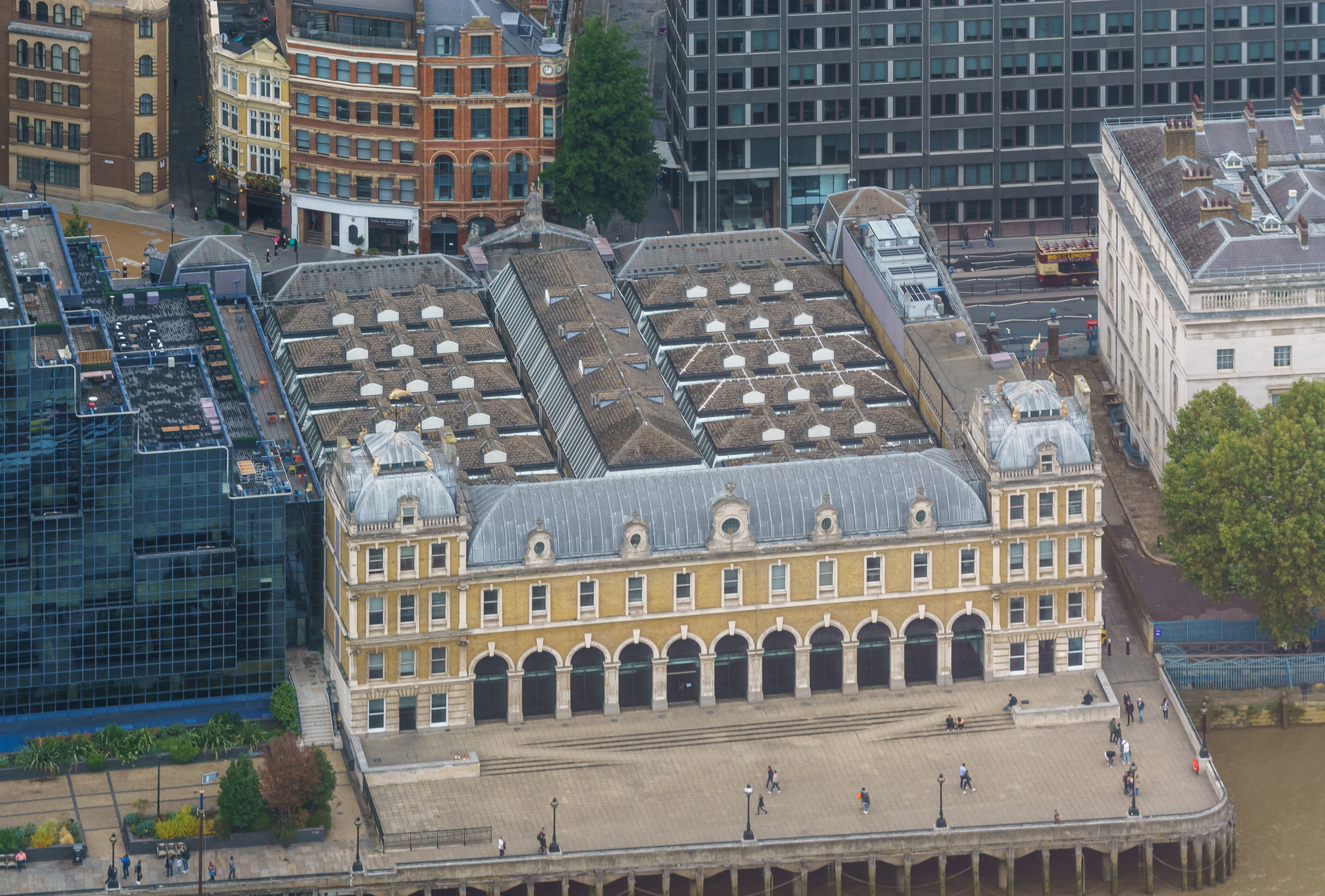
View of the market from The Shard

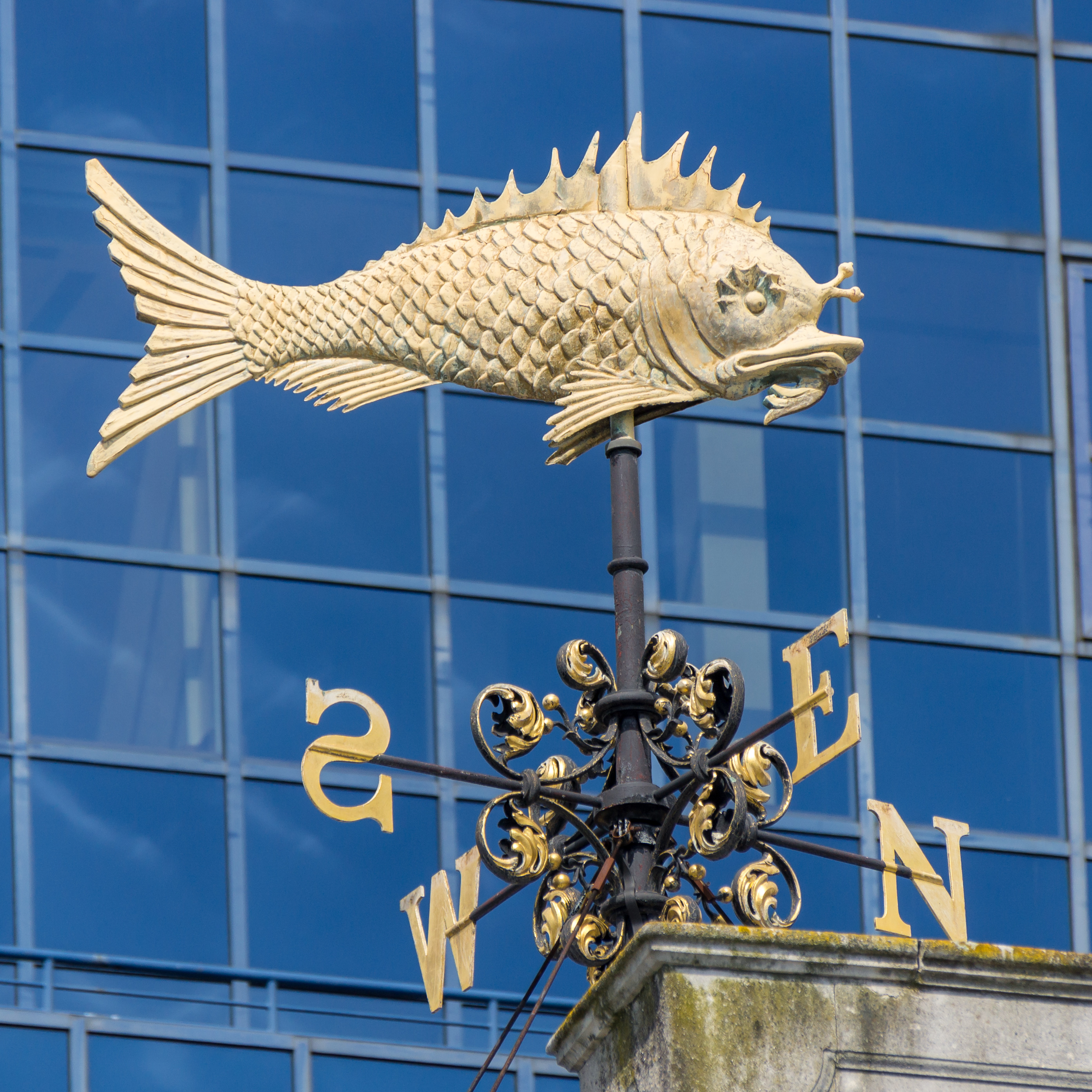
Weather vane

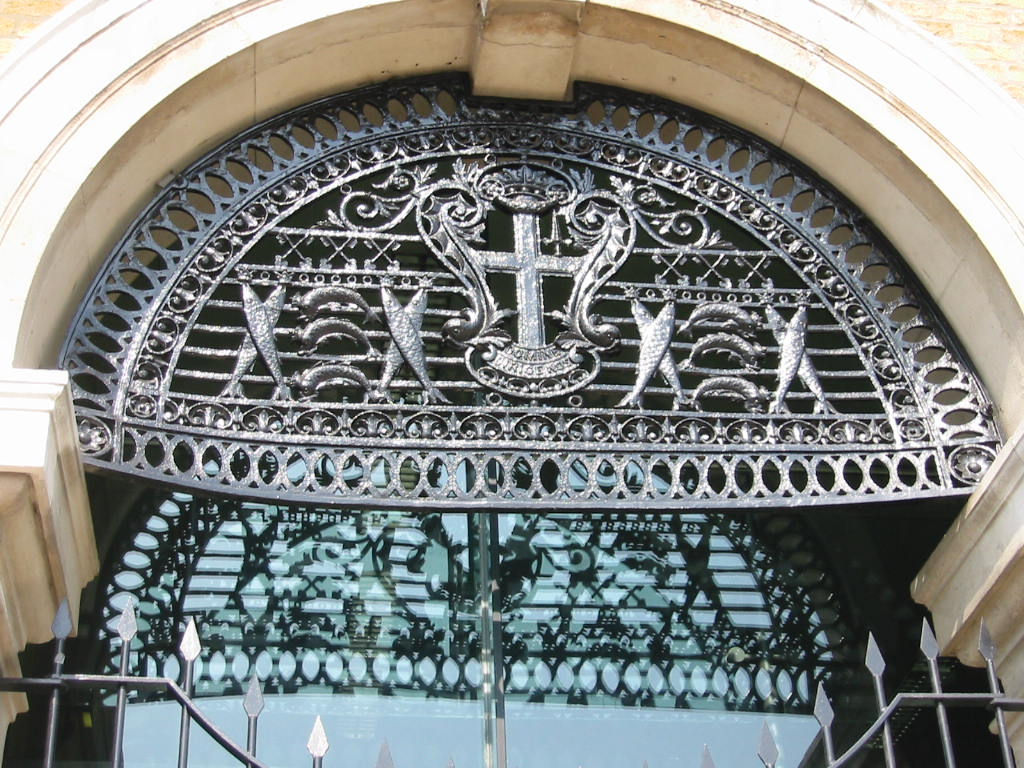
Door detail

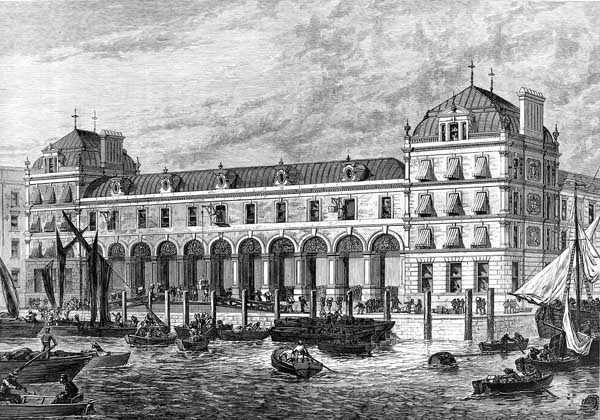
Market in 1876
