= Changing Homes =

Painting by George Elgar Hicks

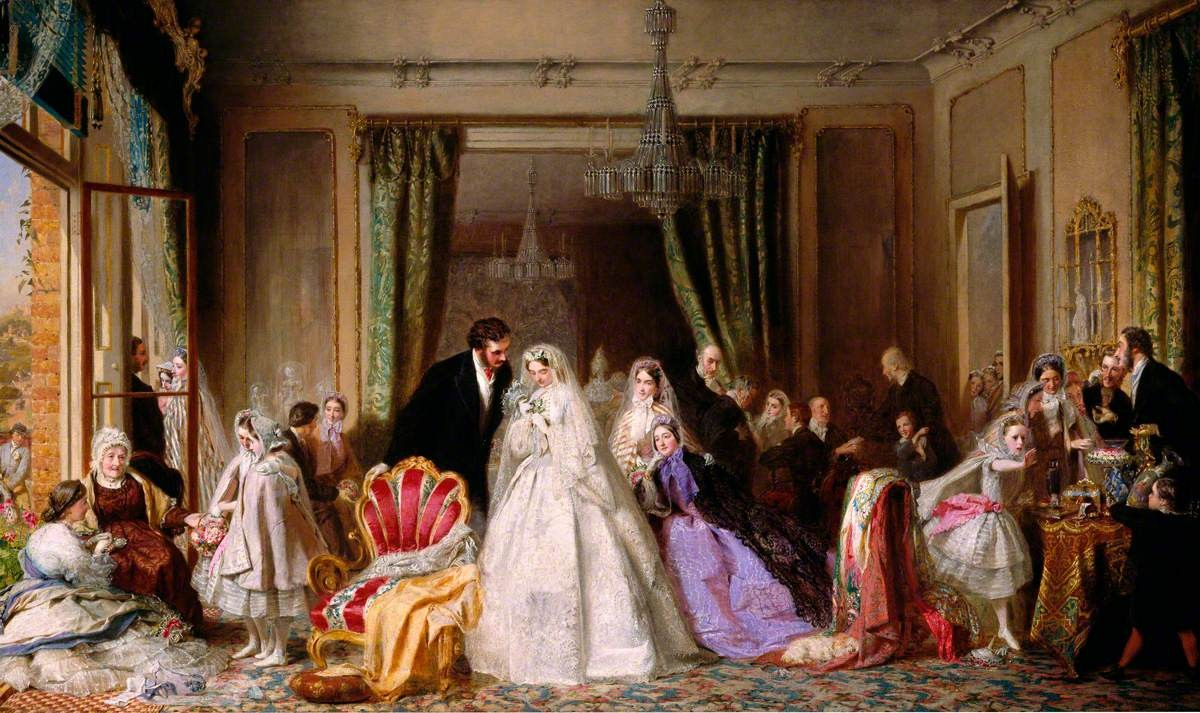
- Artist: George Elgar Hicks
- Year: 1862
- Type: Oil on canvas, genre painting
- Dimensions: 89 cm × 150 cm (35 in × 59 in)
- Location: Museum of the Home, London

Changing Homes is an 1862 oil painting by the British artist George Elgar Hicks. A genre painting it depicts a wedding party, most probably during the 1840s. The new bride contemplates leaving her old family home to start a new life with her husband.

Hicks was noted for his scenes of everyday Victorian life, which resembled those of William Powell Frith. This work was commissioned by the art dealer Louis Victor Flatow for £500. The picture was displayed at the Royal Academy Exhibition of 1863 held at the National Gallery in London. Today it is in the Museum of the Home, having been acquired for the collection in 1974.

== Bibliography ==
- Allwood, Rosamond. George Elgar Hicks: Painter of Victorian Life. Geffrye Museum, 1982.
- Hammerschlag, Keren Rosa. The Chosen Race: Troubling Whiteness in Victorian Painting. University of California Press, 2026.
- Kestner, Joseph A. Masculinities in Victorian Painting. Taylor & Francis, 2026.
- Woodward, Kathleen. Figuring Age: Women, Bodies, Generations. Indiana University Press, 1999.
