= Dividend Day at the Bank of England =

Painting by George Elgar Hicks

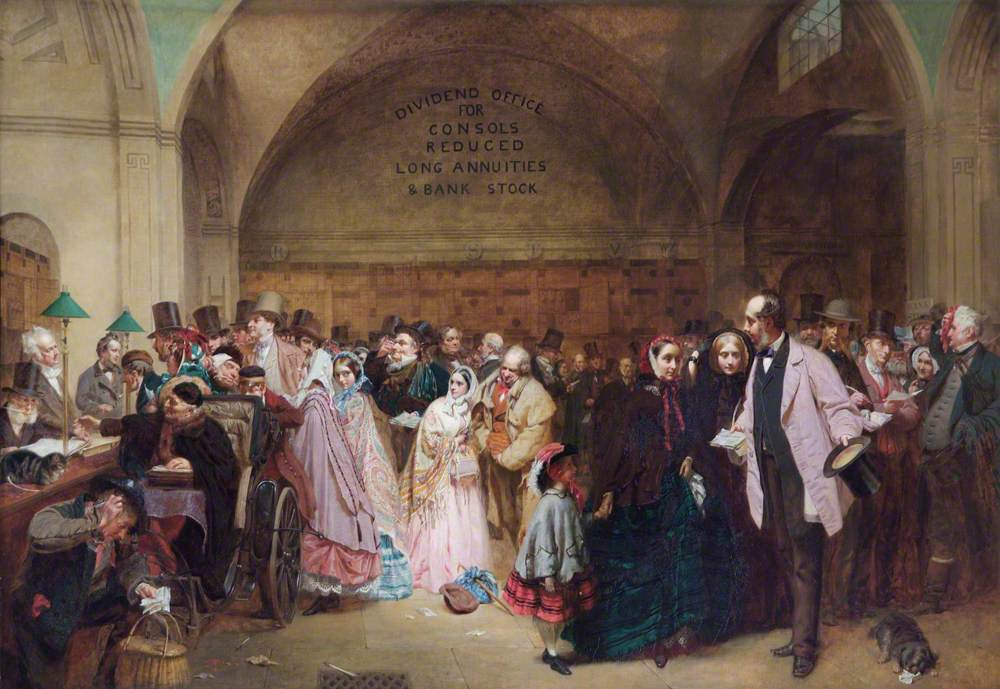
- Artist: George Elgar Hicks
- Year: 1859
- Type: Oil on canvas, genre painting
- Dimensions: 90 cm × 135 cm (35 in × 53 in)
- Location: Bank of England Museum, London

Dividend Day at the Bank of England is an 1859 genre painting by the British artist George Elgar Hicks. It depicts a scene at the Bank of England in the City of London during the quarterly dividend day when individual holders could collect from consols. Many present were widows and children, dependent on the payouts for their living costs.

Hicks was inspired by the popular success of crowd scenes in William Powell Frith's Ramsgate Sands and The Derby Day. The work was displayed at the Royal Academy Exhibition of 1859 held at the National Gallery. It was a hit with the public but less well-received by critics. The painting is now in the collection of the Bank of England Museum, having been given by the artist in 1903. A preliminary study is at Wimpole Hall in Cambridgeshire.

== See also ==
- The General Post Office, One Minute to Six, an 1860 painting by Hicks

== Bibliography ==
- Hennessey, Elizabeth. A Domestic History of the Bank of England, 1930-1960. Cambridge University Press, 1992.
- Kynaston, David. Till Time's Last Sand; A History of the Bank of England 1694-2013. Bloomsbury, 2020.
- Murphy, Anne L. Virtuous Bankers; A Day in the Life of the Eighteenth-Century Bank of England.
