= George Elgar Hicks =

English painter (1824–1914)

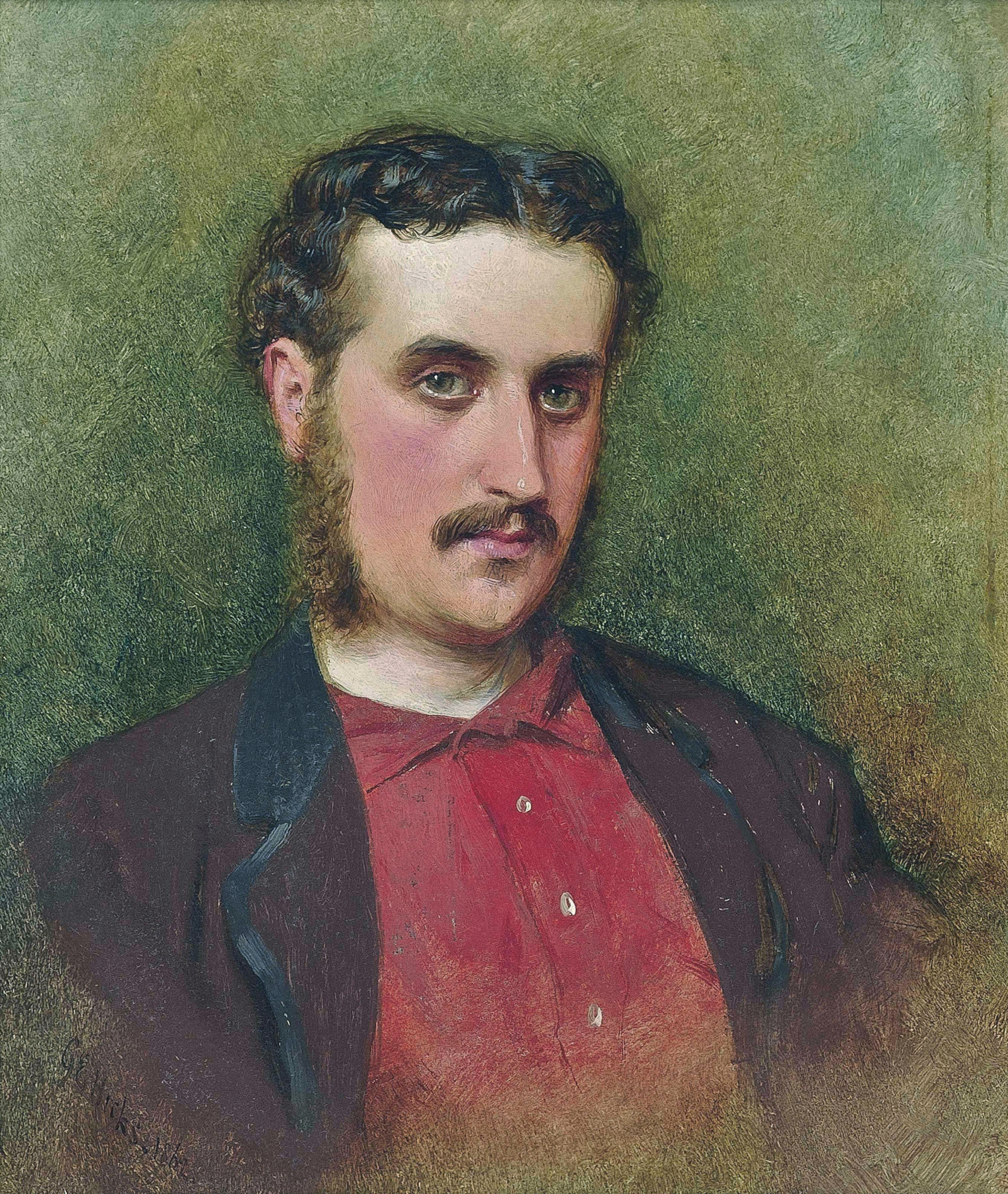
Self portrait (George Elgar Hicks, 1862)

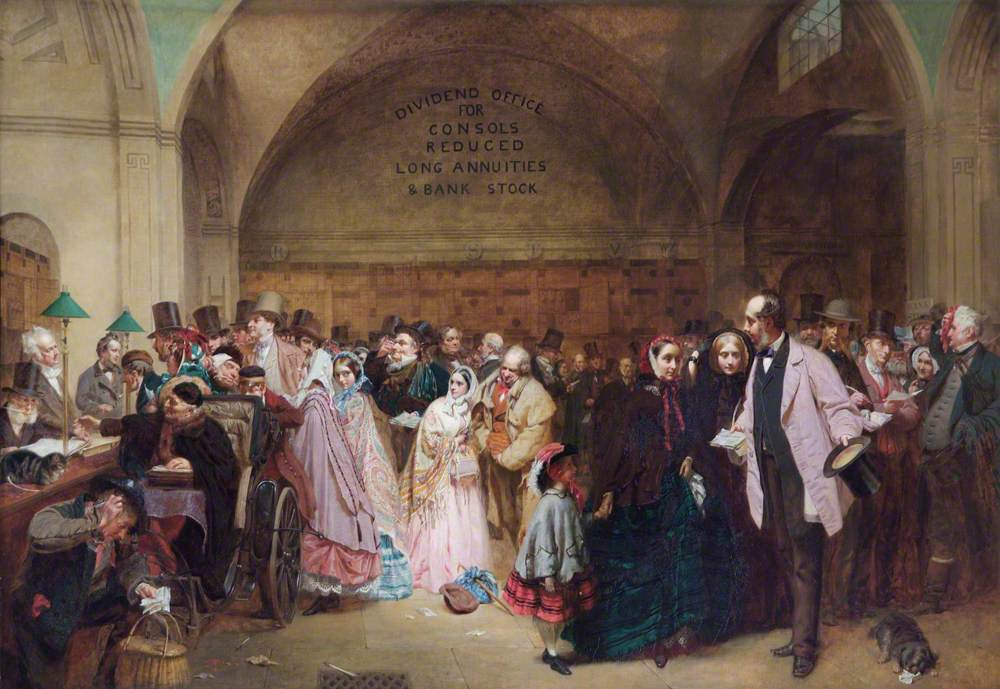
Dividend Day at the Bank of England (1859, RA)

George Elgar Hicks (13 March 1824 – 1914) was an English painter during the Victorian era. He is best known for his large genre paintings, which emulate William Powell Frith in style, but was also a society portraitist.

== Biography ==
Born on 13 March 1824 in Lymington, Hampshire, George Elgar Hicks was the second son of a wealthy magistrate. His parents encouraged Hicks to become a doctor and so Hicks studied medicine at University College from 1840 to 1842. However, after three years' "arduous and disagreeable study" Hicks decided he wanted to be an artist. Due to these circumstances, Hicks began training considerably later in life than most artists of the time. In 1843, Hicks attended Sass's Academy and by 1844 had entered the Royal Academy Schools.

In 1847 Hicks married Maria Hariss and six of their eight children were born in the seven years following. He did not achieve much success as an artist during this period and later referred to his art at this time as "small and unimportant." He blamed this on the fact he had little time to study art or interact with other artists, due to a busy family life.

In 1859, Hicks painted his first large genre painting, Dividend Day at the Bank of England (exhibited at the Royal Academy in 1859) – following the success of Frith's paintings Ramsgate Sands and The Derby Day at the Royal Academy. It was a typical genre painting, showing a scene from the Bank of England and featuring a broad range of social classes. He painted several more large modern-life paintings in the following years which were generally poorly reviewed by critics. These include The General Post Office. One minute to 6 (1860), Billingsgate Fish Market (1861) and Changing Homes (1862). Hicks' paintings were often of subjects that no other artists attempted, such as the General Post Office and Billingsgate Fish Market. Hicks was one of the few artists that showed lasting interest in the emulation of Frith's style and is generally considered Frith's principal imitator.

By the late 1860s, the popularity of genre painting had declined and Hicks began to focus on historical subjects, leading to society portraiture in the 1870s.

In 1884, Hicks remarried following the death of Maria in 1881. He retired in the 1890s and died a month before the declaration of World War I in 1914.

== Gallery ==
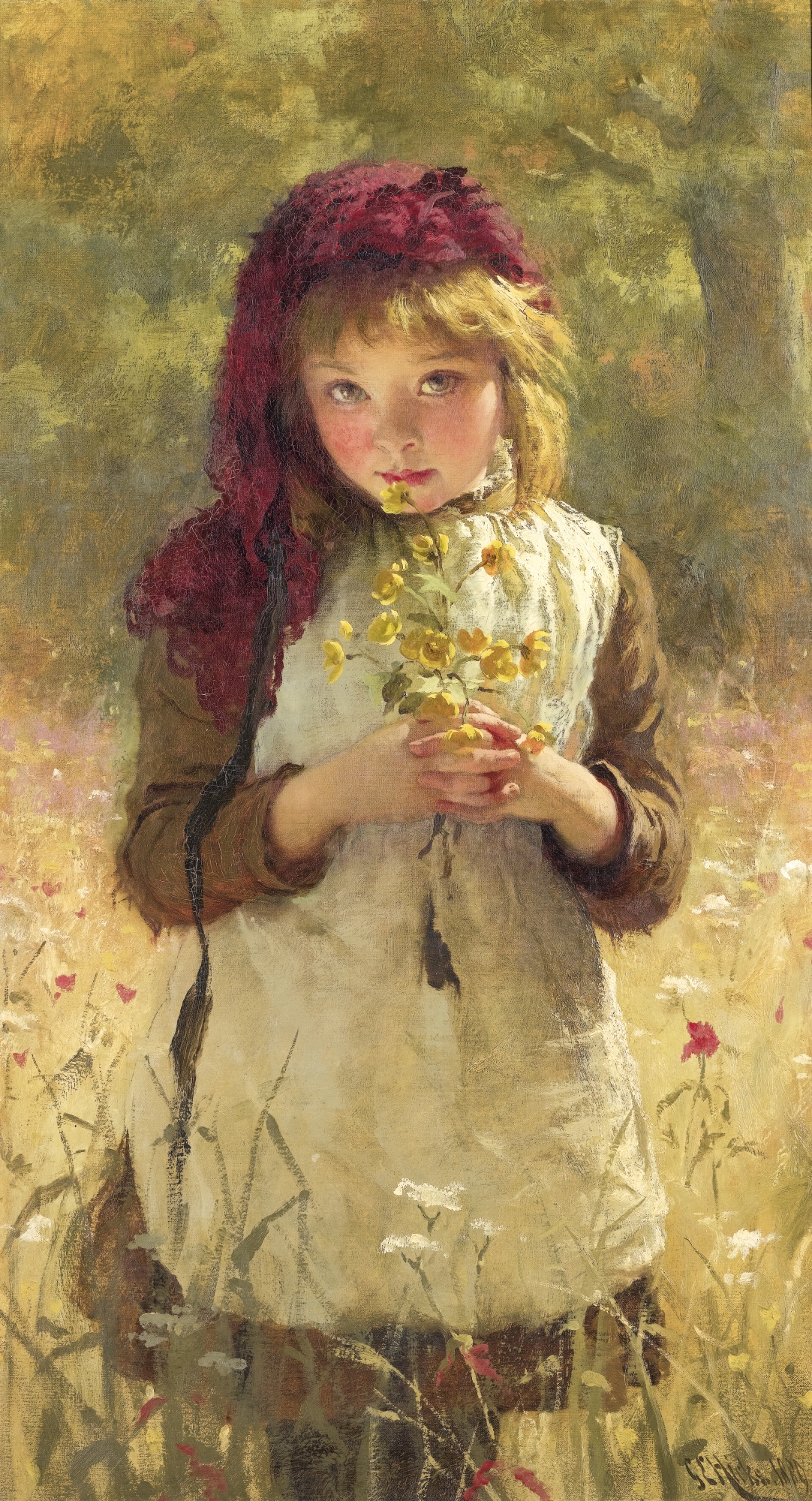
Buttercups, 1889

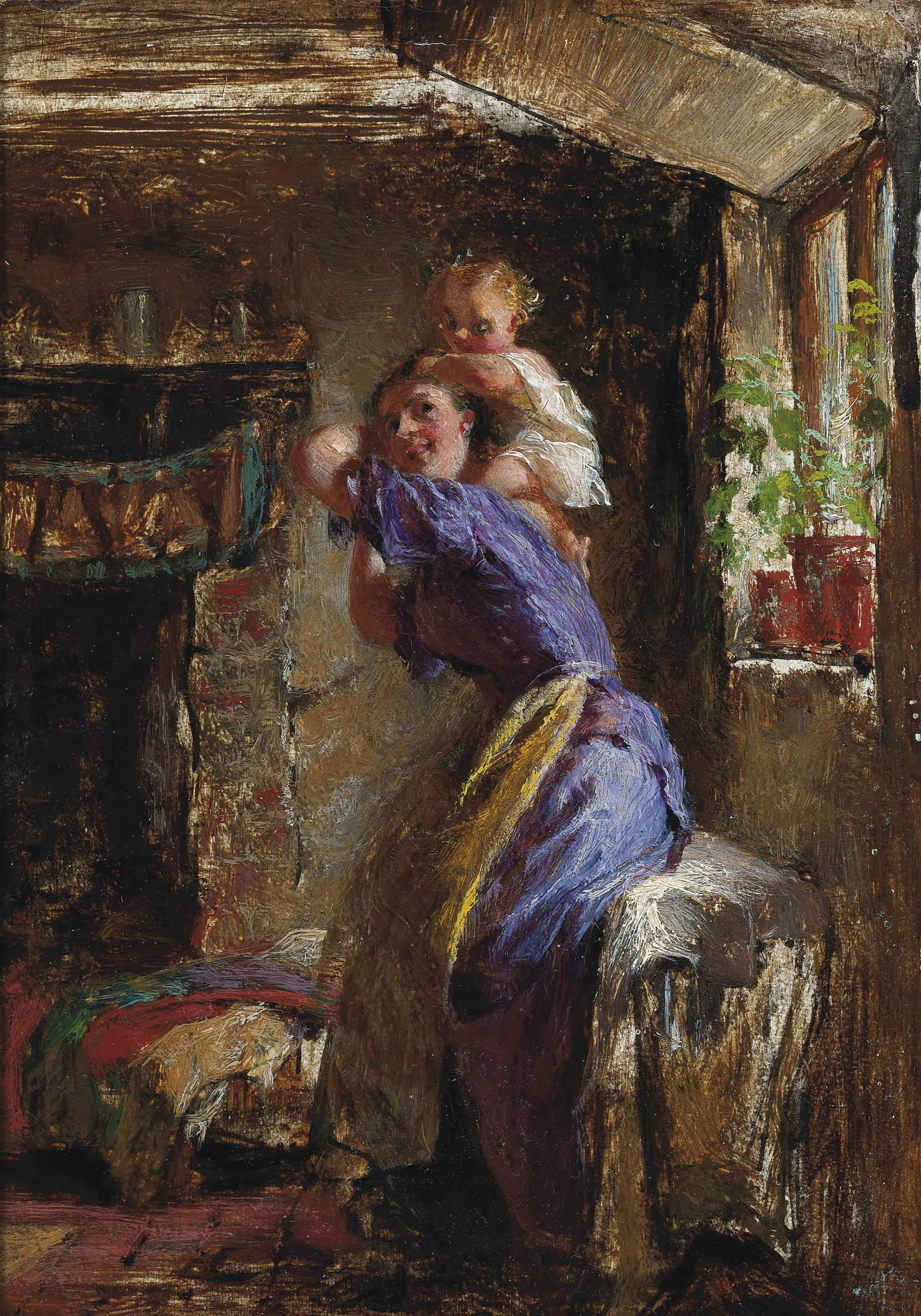
Playtime, 1866

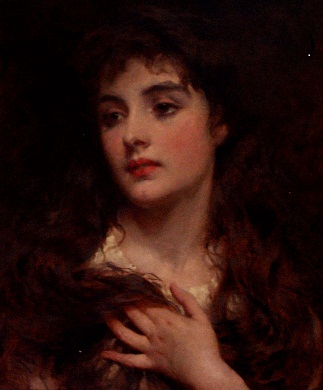
Portrait, circa 1890

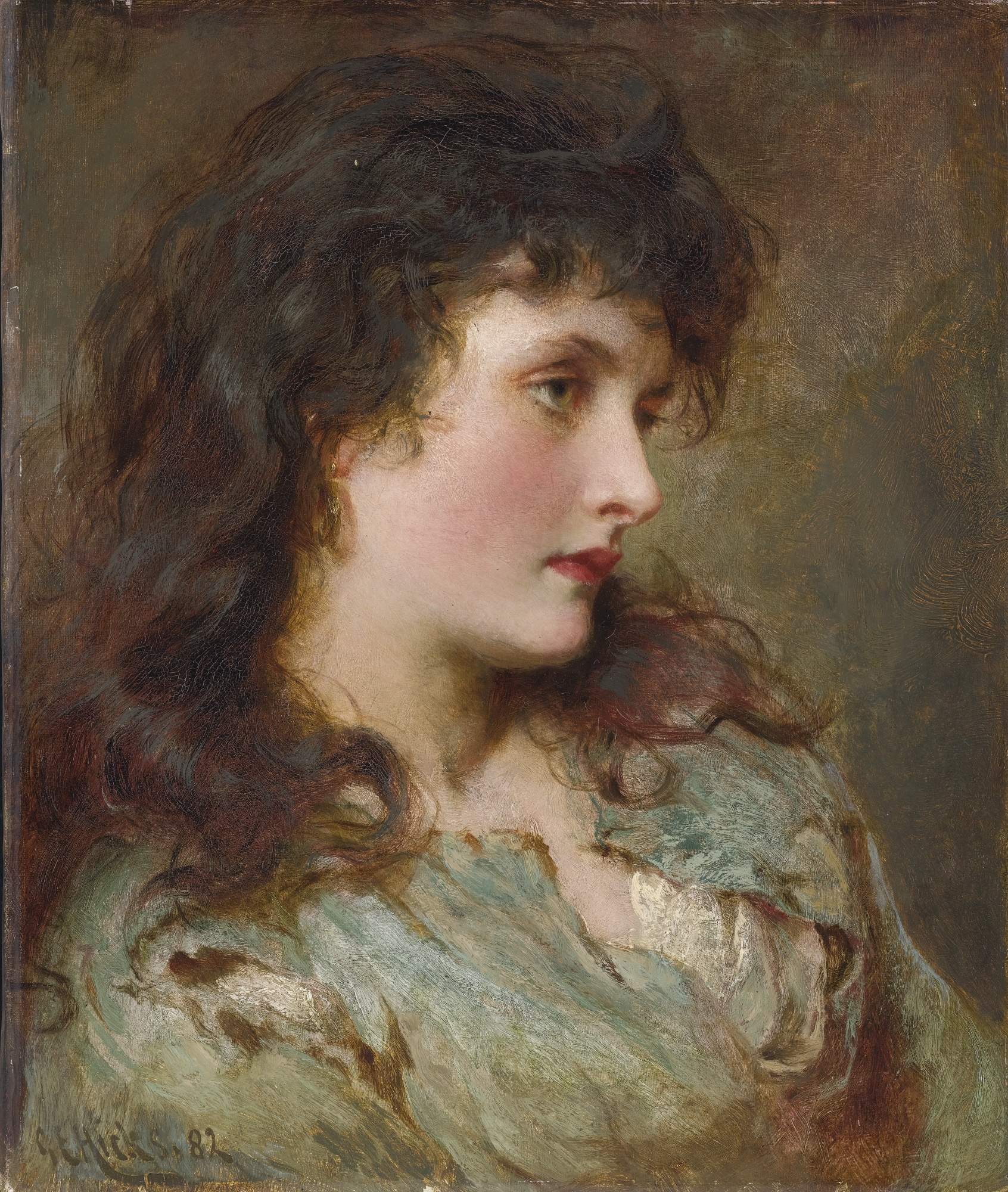
Maud, 1882

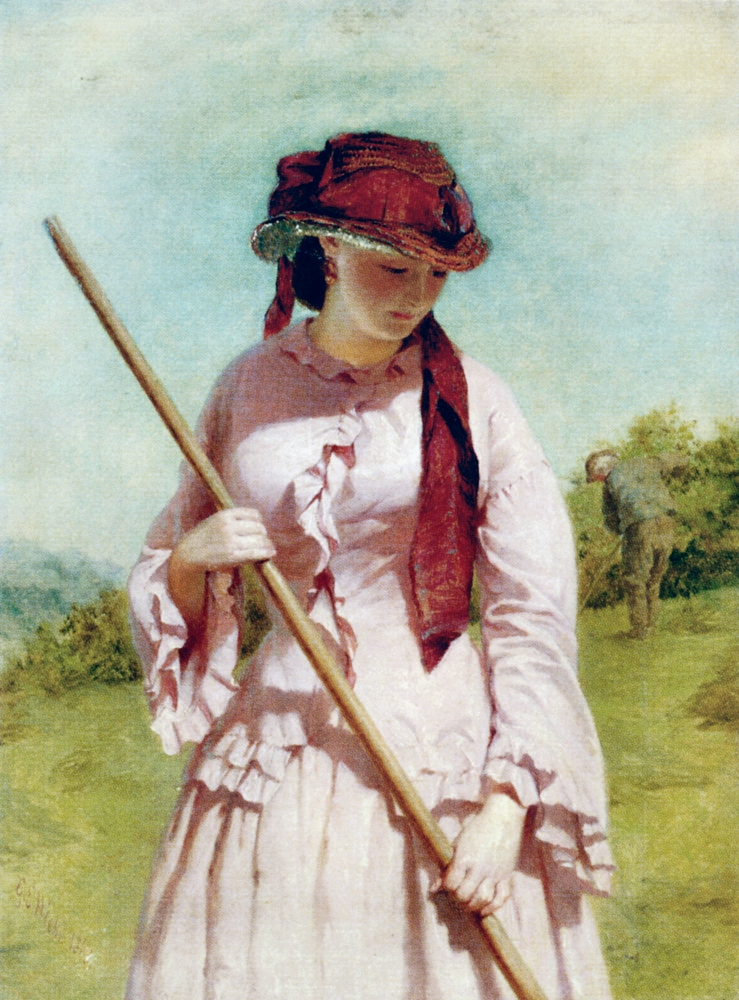
The Farmer's Daughter, circa 1880

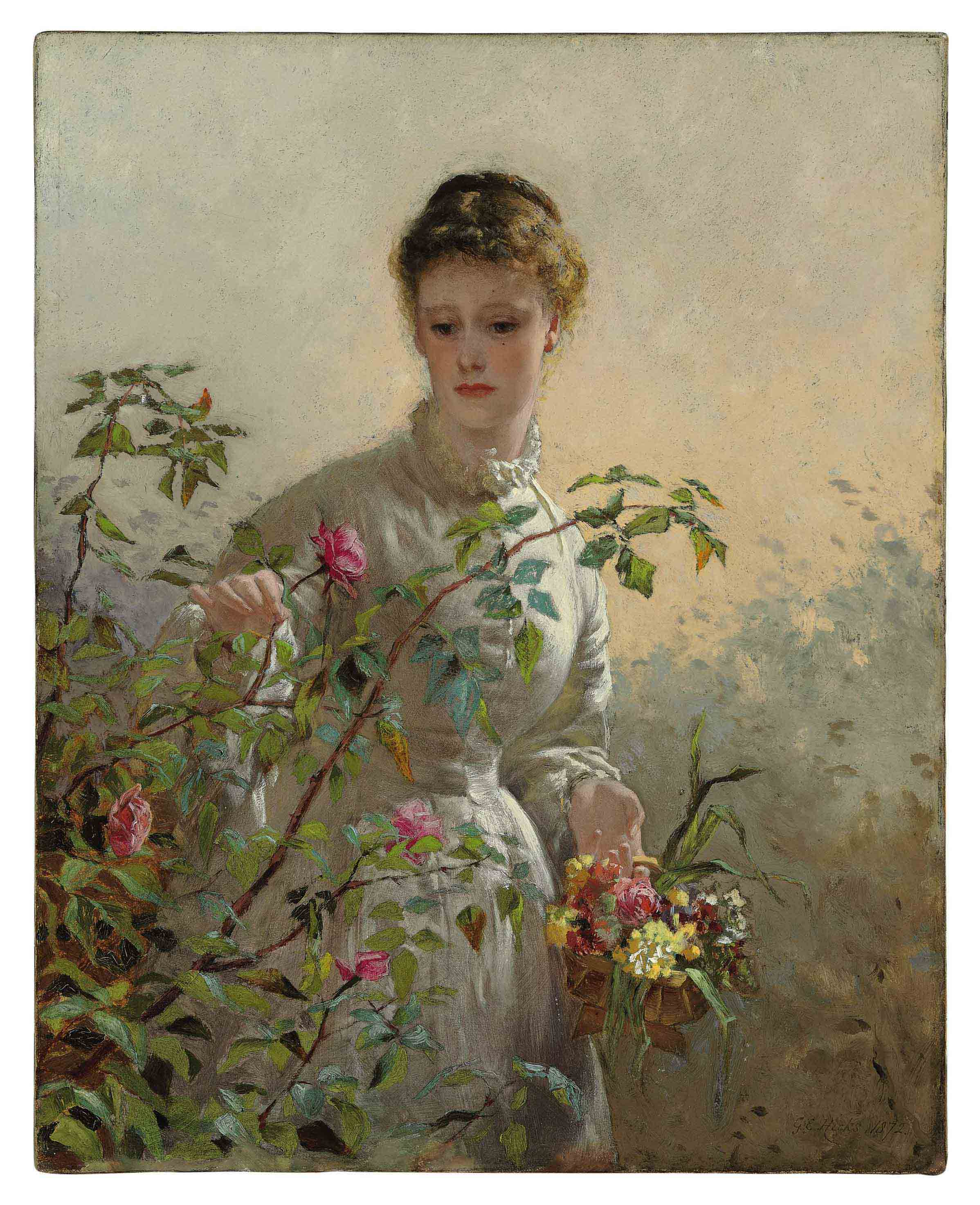
A Summer Bouquet, 1872

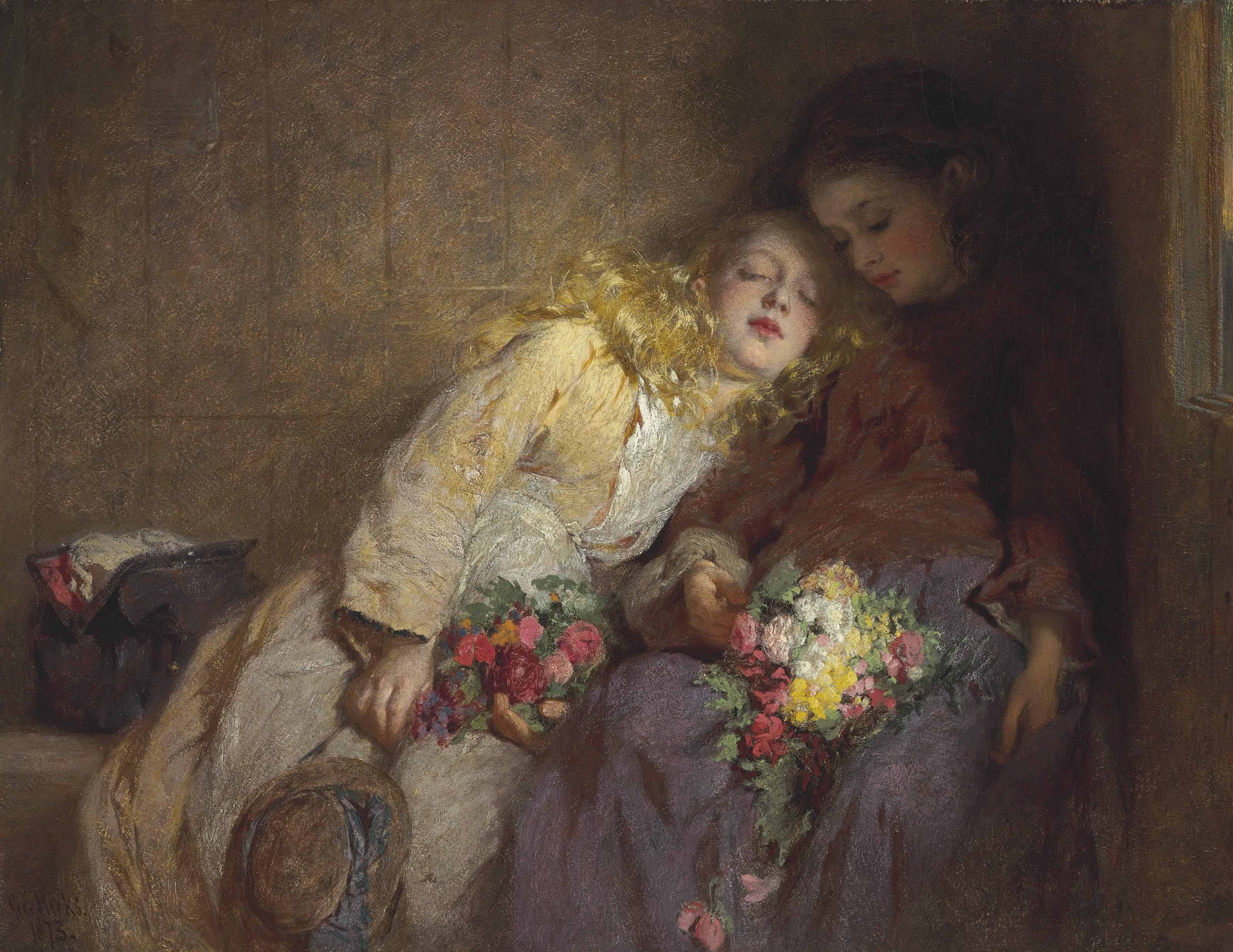
The Return Home, 1873

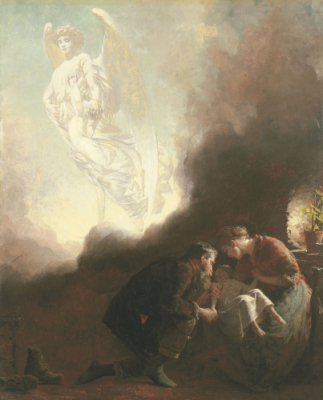
A Cloud With A Silver Lining, 1890

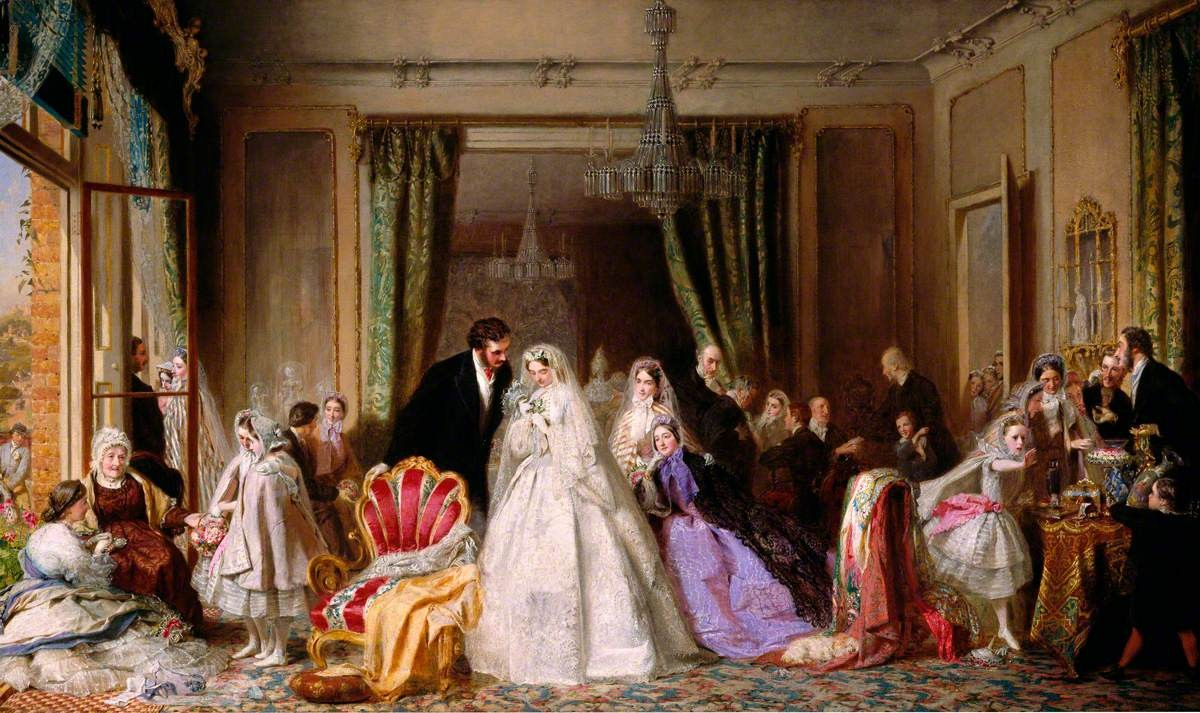
Changing Homes, 1862

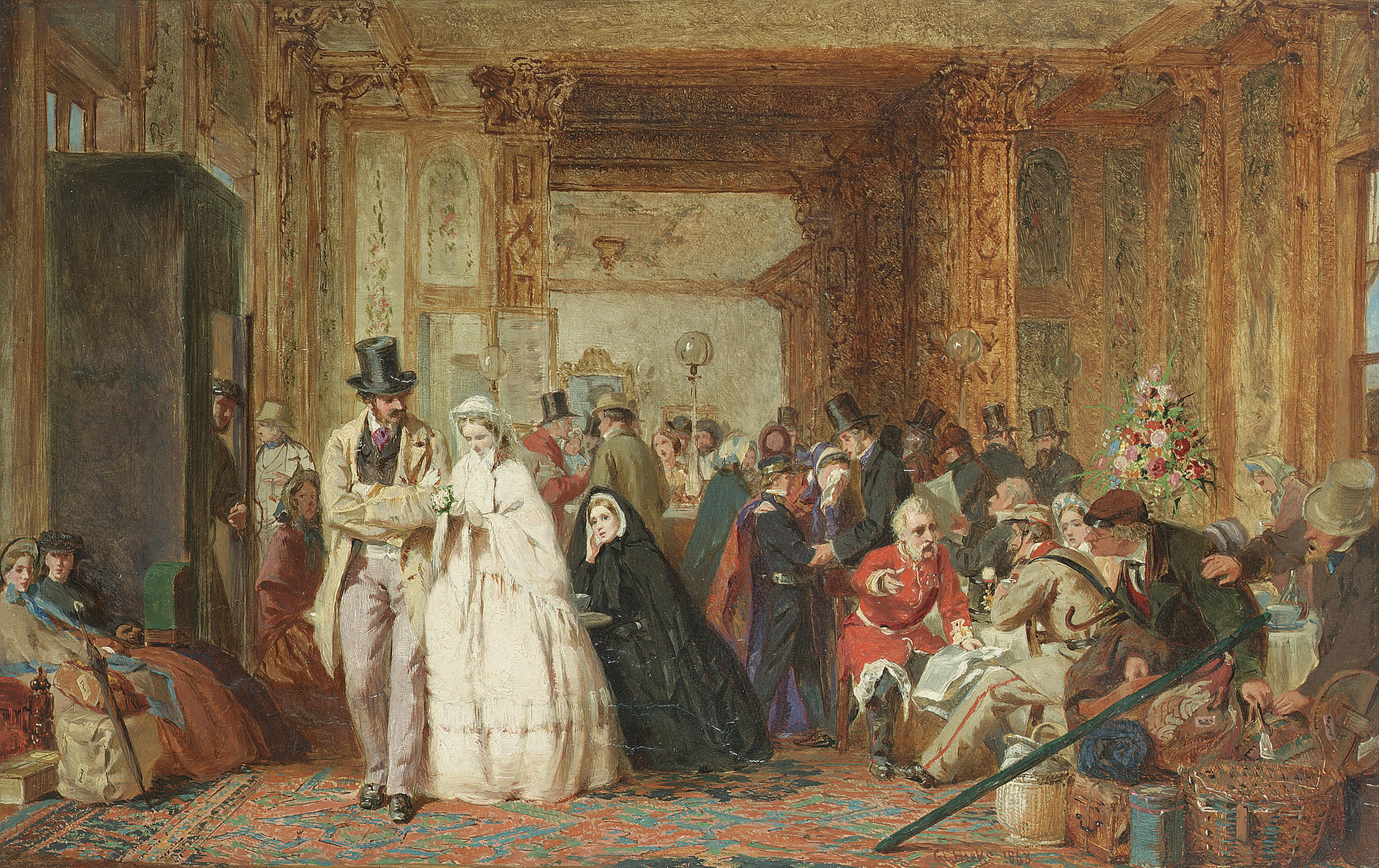
The Buffet Swindon Station, 1863

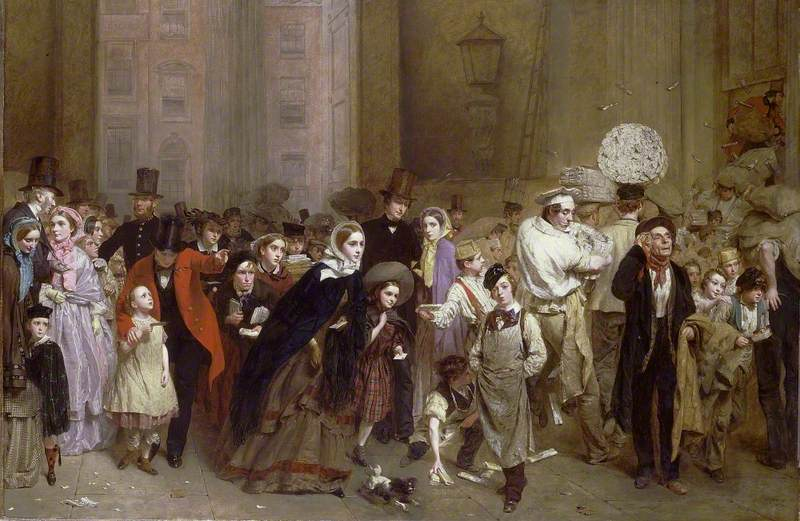
The General Post Office, One Minute to Six, 1860

Billingsgate Fish Market, 1861

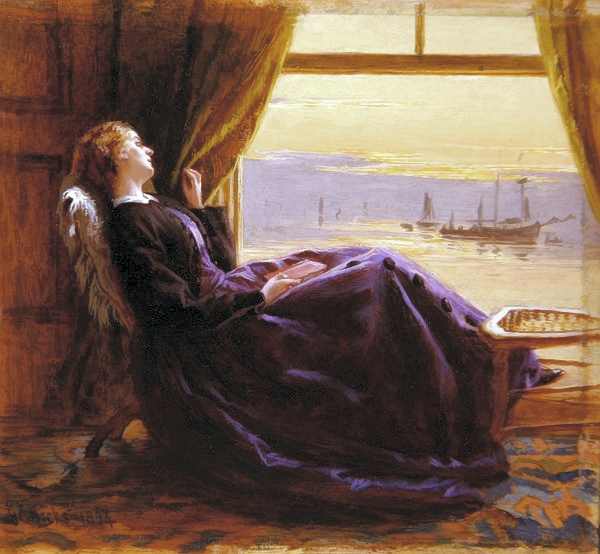
At Evening Time, 1866

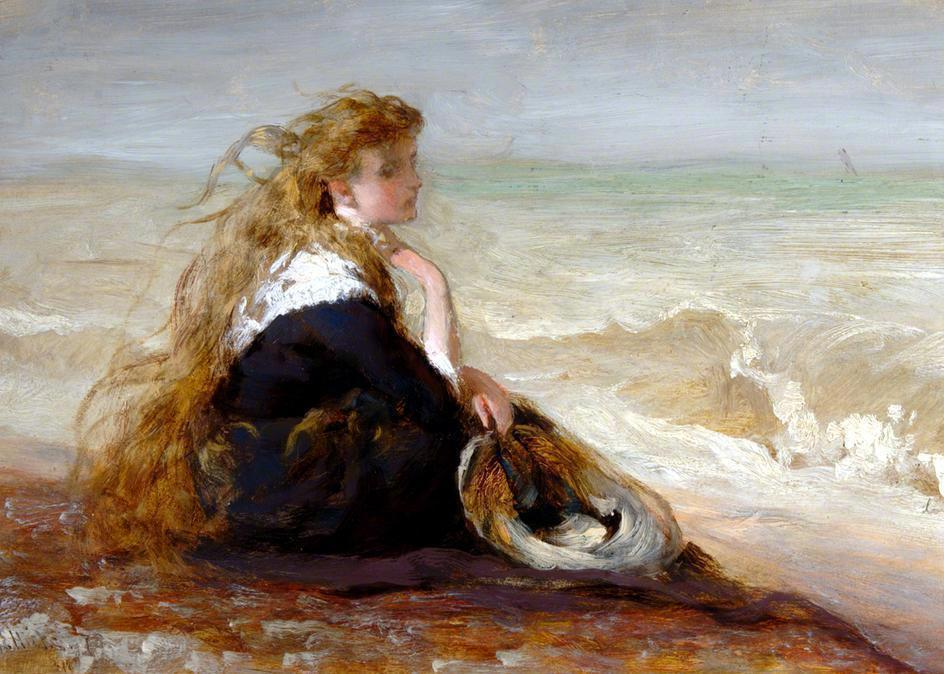
Girl Seated by the Seashore, 1878
