= The Picador =

The Picador may refer to:

- The Picador (film)
- The Picador (watercolour painting)
