= The Wounded Man =

The Wounded Man may refer to:

- The Wounded Man (painting) (L'Homme blessé), a 19th-century painting by Gustave Courbet
- The Wounded Man (film) (L'Homme blessé), a 1983 French film directed by Patrice Chéreau
- Wound Man, an illustration which first appeared in European surgical texts in the Middle Ages

== See also ==
- Wounded Man, Japanese manga
