= The Picador (watercolour painting) =

1832 watercolor by Eugène Delacroix

- Le Picador (French)
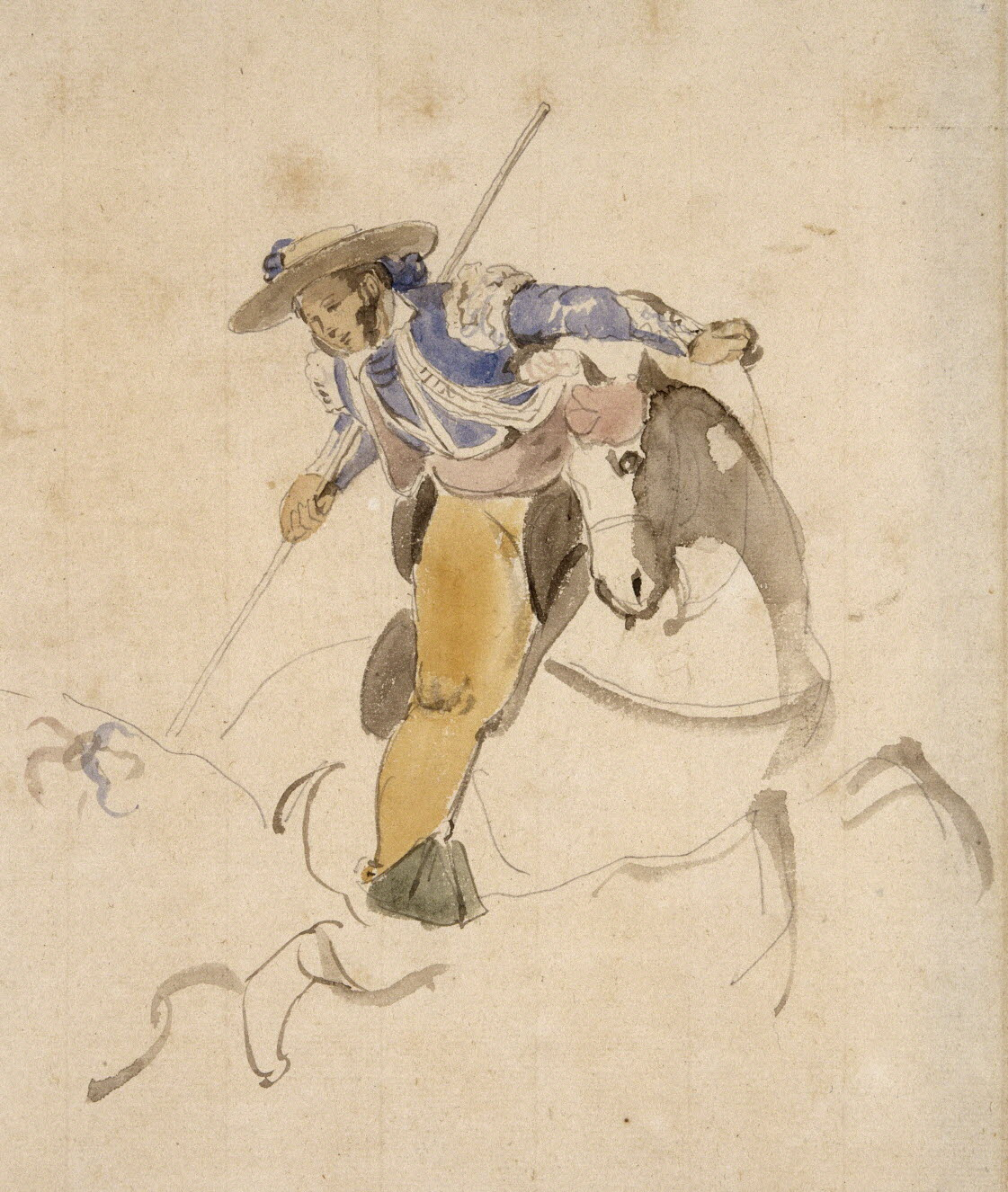
- Artist: Eugène Delacroix
- Year: 1932
- Medium: Watercolor
- Dimensions: 28.8 cm × 21.9 cm (11.3 in × 8.6 in)
- Location: Louvre, Paris

The Picador is an 1832 watercolor painting by the French Romantic painter Eugène Delacroix, showing the 'tercio de pique' or third phase of a bullfight. It is held in the department of prints and drawings at the Louvre with other drawings of bullfights by the same artist, notably Picador and Chuletillo (lead pencil, 1832).

The work's small dimensions allowed him to compete with the sinister The Bullfights of Bordeaux by Goya. Luigina Rossi-Bortolatto considers that the work's poses draw on the painter's The Battle of Nancy, painted the previous year. The man's simple gesture and the soft colours of the clothes are a major contrast with his paintings such as The Lion Hunt
