= Sylvain Amic =

French art historian (1967–2025)

- Born: Sylvain Aimé Louis Amic; 26 April 1967; Dakar, Senegal
- Died: 31 August 2025 (aged 58); Bagnols-sur-Cèze, France
- Occupation: Art historian

Sylvain Aimé Louis Amic (French pronunciation: [silvɛ̃ amik]; 26 April 1967 – 31 August 2025) was a Senegal-born French art historian. A member of the Academy of Sciences, Belles-Lettres and Arts of Rouen, he served as president of the Musée d'Orsay and the Musée de l'Orangerie in Paris from 2024 to 2025.

== Career ==
Amic was born in Dakar. He worked as a teacher before training as a curator at the National Institute of Cultural Heritage, graduating in 1997. He specialised in modern and contemporary art.

Between 2016 and 2022 Amic directed the Réunion des Musées Métropolitains Rouen Normandie (RMM), an umbrella institution of museums of the Métropole Rouen Normandie. In 2018 he was tasked, together with the curator Olivia Voisin, by then-Minister of Culture Françoise Nyssen with developing a project for the circulation of artworks between the French regions.

Amic had already been a candidate as president of the Musée d'Orsay in 2017, at which time the position went to Laurence des Cars. He assumed the position in 2024.

Amic died from a heart attack on 31 August 2025, at his vacation home in Bagnols-sur-Cèze, Gard, at the age of 58.

== Honours ==
- Knight of the Ordre des Arts et des Lettres (2014)
