= Musée d'Orsay =

Art museum in Paris, France

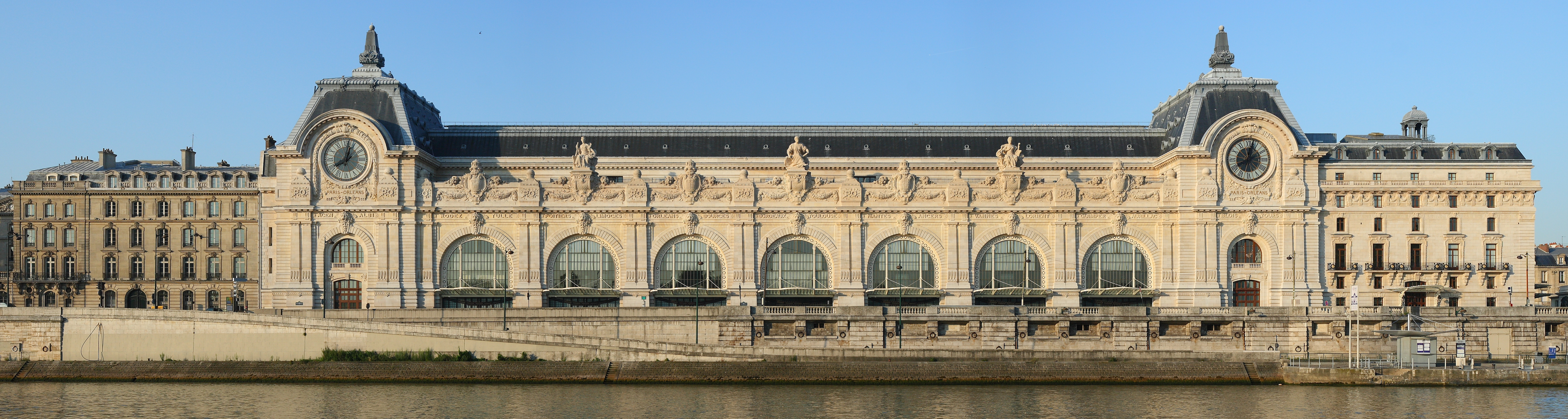
- Musée d'Orsay seen from the right bank of the Seine river
- Interactive fullscreen map
- Established: 1986
- Location: Rue de Lille 75343 Paris, France
- Coordinates: 48°51′36″N 2°19′35″E
- Type: Art museum, design/textile museum, historic site
- Visitors: 3.9 million (2023)
- Director: Serge Lemoine
- Public transit access: Solférino; Musée d'Orsay
- Website: musee-orsay.fr

The Musée d'Orsay (UK: /ˌmjuːzeɪ dɔːrˈseɪ/ MEW-zay dor-SAY, US: /mjuːˈzeɪ -/ mew-ZAY -, French: [myze dɔʁsɛ]; English: Orsay Museum) is a museum in Paris, France, on the Left Bank of the Seine. One of the largest art museums in Europe, it is housed in the former Gare d'Orsay, a Beaux-Arts railway station built from 1898 to 1900. The museum holds mainly French artworks (including works by France-based foreign artists) dating from 1848 to 1914, including paintings, sculptures, furniture, and photography. It houses the largest collection of Impressionist and post-Impressionist masterpieces in the world, by painters such as Monet, Manet, Renoir, Morisot, Degas, Sisley, Cézanne, Seurat, Gauguin, and van Gogh. Many of these works were held at the Galerie nationale du Jeu de Paume prior to the museum's opening in 1986.

The museum had 3.2 million visitors in 2022, making it the sixth-most-visited art museum in the world, and second-most-visited art museum in France after the Louvre.

== History ==
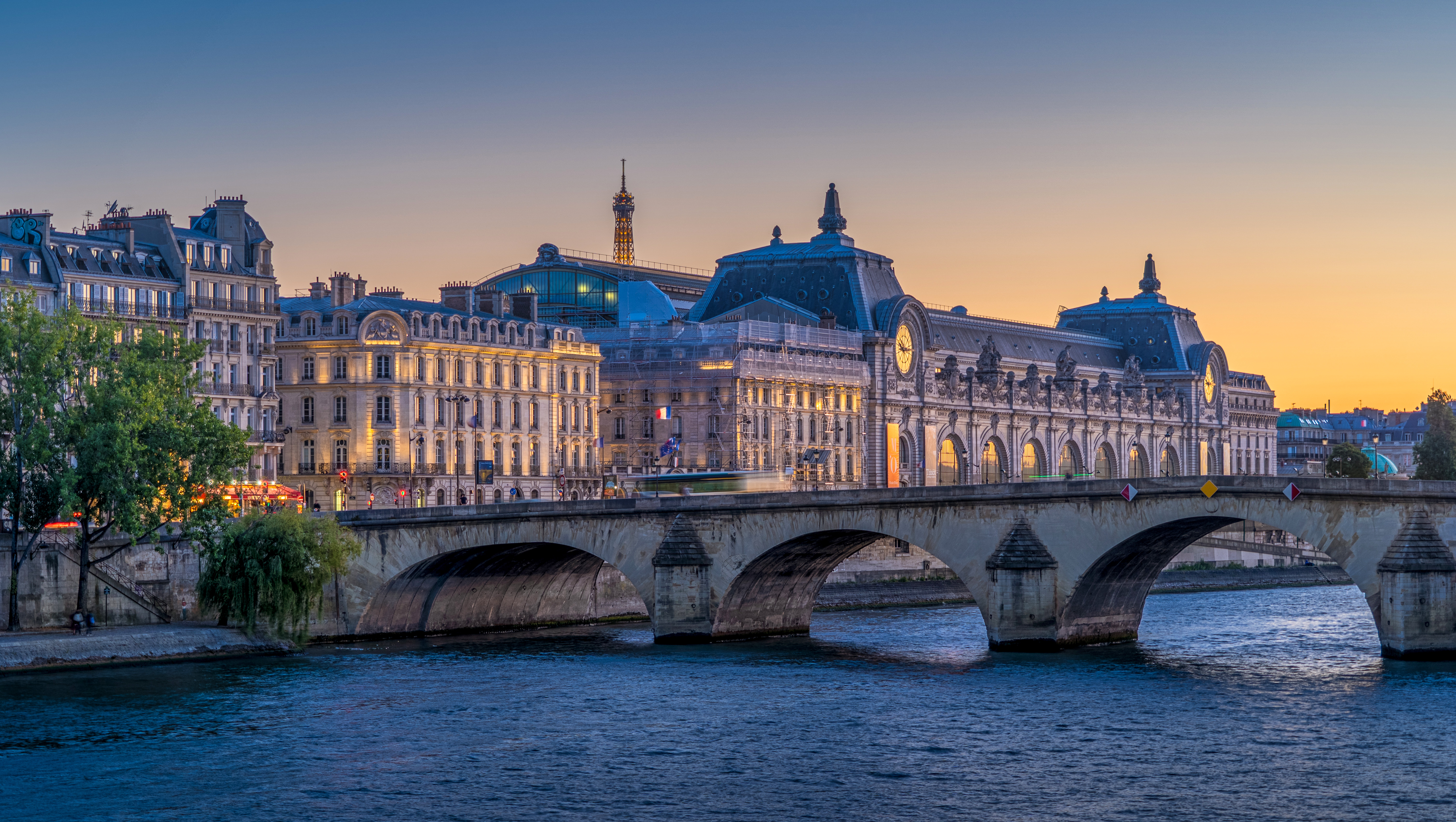
Musée d'Orsay as seen from the Pont du Carrousel

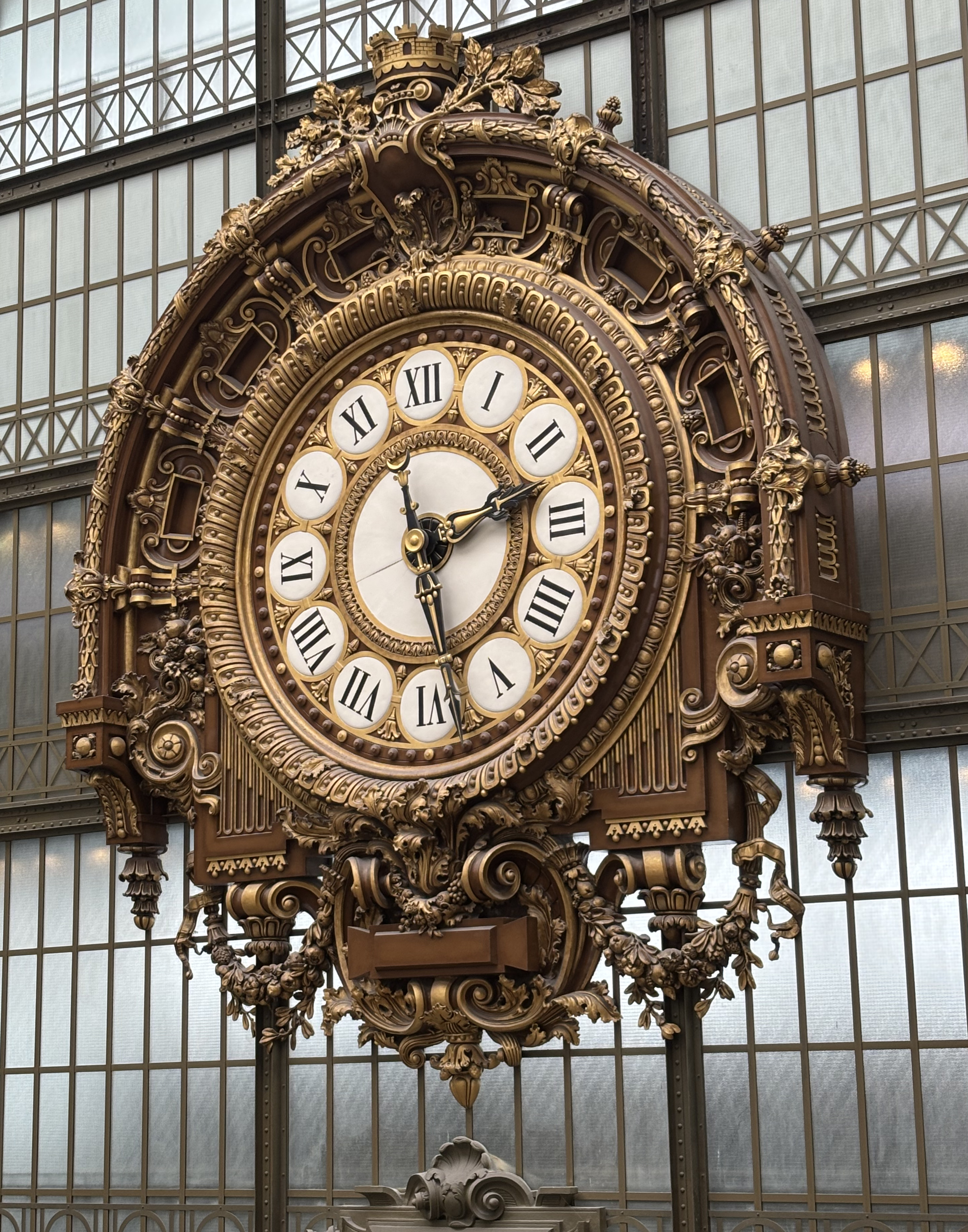
Musée d'Orsay Clock in the main hall, created by Victor Laloux

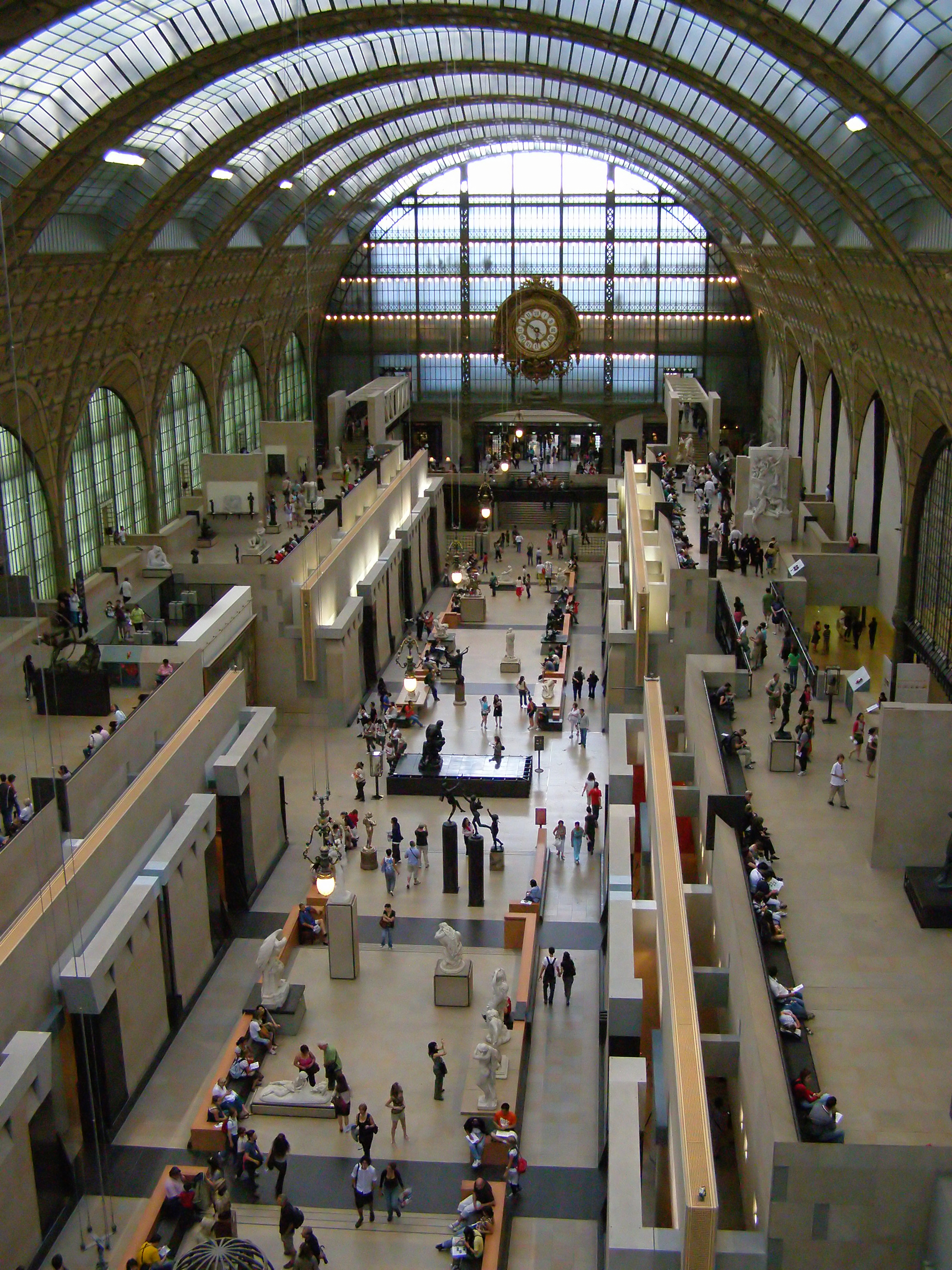
The interior of the main hall

The museum building was originally a railway station, Gare d'Orsay, located next to the Seine river. Built on the site of the Palais d'Orsay, its central location was convenient for commuting travelers. The station was constructed for the Chemin de Fer de Paris à Orléans and finished in time for the 1900 Exposition Universelle to the design of three architects: Lucien Magne, Émile Bénard and Victor Laloux. The Gare d'Orsay design was considered to be an "anachronism". The museum building reflects 19th-century aesthetics and construction techniques introduced in the wake of projects undertaken to modernize Paris.

One of the permanent exhibits in the museum is devoted to architectural history, focusing on the Paris opera house, and the Palais Garnier, designed by Charles Garnier and built from 1863 to 1875. Another permanent exhibit is dedicated to town planning.

In the 1970s, work began on building a 1 km-long tunnel under the station as part of the creation of line C of the Réseau Express Régional with a new station under the old station. In 1970, permission was granted to demolish the station but Jacques Duhamel, Minister for Cultural Affairs, ruled against plans to build a new hotel in its stead. The station was put on the supplementary list of Historic Monuments and finally listed in 1978. The suggestion to turn the station into a museum came from the Directorate of the Museum of France. The idea was to build a museum that would bridge the gap between the Louvre and the National Museum of Modern Art at the Georges Pompidou Centre. The plan was accepted by Georges Pompidou and a study was commissioned in 1974. In 1978, a competition was organized to design the new museum. ACT Architecture, a team of three young architects (Pierre Colboc, Renaud Bardon and Jean-Paul Philippon), were awarded the contract which involved creating 20,000 square metres (220,000 sq ft) of new floorspace on four floors. The construction work was carried out by Bouygues. In 1981, the Italian architect Gae Aulenti was chosen to design the interior including the internal arrangement, decoration, furniture and fittings of the museum. The arrangement of the galleries she designed was elaborate and inhabited the three main levels that are under the museum's barrel vault atrium. On the main level of the building, a central nave was formed by the surrounding stone structures that were previously the building's train platforms. The central nave's structures break up the immense sculpture and gallery spaces and provided more organized units for viewing the art.

In July 1986, the museum was ready to receive its exhibits. It took six months to install the approximately 2,000 paintings, 600 sculptures, and other works. The museum was officially opened in December 1986 by then-president François Mitterrand. At any given time about 3,000 art pieces are on display at Musée d'Orsay. Within the museum is a 1:100 scale model created by Richard Peduzzi of an aerial view of the Paris Opera and surrounding area. This model is encapsulated underneath glass flooring that visitors walk on as they proceed through the museum, allowing them to understand the city planning of Paris at the time, which has made this attraction one of the most popular within the museum.

Another exhibit within the museum is "A Passion for France: The Marlene and Spencer Hays Collection". This collection was donated by Marlene and Spencer Hays, art collectors who reside in Texas and have been collecting art since the early 1970s. In 2016 the museum complied to keeping the collection of about 600 art pieces in one collection rather than dispersed throughout other exhibits. Since World War II, France has not been donated a collection of foreign art this large. The collection favors mostly post-impressionist works. Artists featured in this collection are Bonnard, Vuillard, Maurice Denis, Odilon Redon, Aristide Maillol, André Derain, Edgar Degas, and Jean-Baptiste-Camille Corot. To make room for the art that has been donated, the Musée d'Orsay is scheduled to undergo a radical transformation over a decade starting in 2020. This remodel is funded in part by an anonymous US patron who donated €20 million to a building project known as Orsay Grand Ouvert (Orsay Wide Open). The gift was made via the American Friends of the Musées d'Orsay et de l'Orangerie. The projected completion date is 2026, implementing new galleries and education opportunities to endorse a conductive experience.

Festival hall of the Musée d'Orsay

The square next to the museum displays six bronze allegorical sculptural groups in a row, originally produced for the Exposition Universelle:

- South America by Aimé Millet
- Asia by Alexandre Falguière
- Oceania by Mathurin Moreau
- Europe by Alexandre Schoenewerk
- North America by Ernest-Eugène Hiolle
- Africa by Eugène Delaplanche

== Collection ==
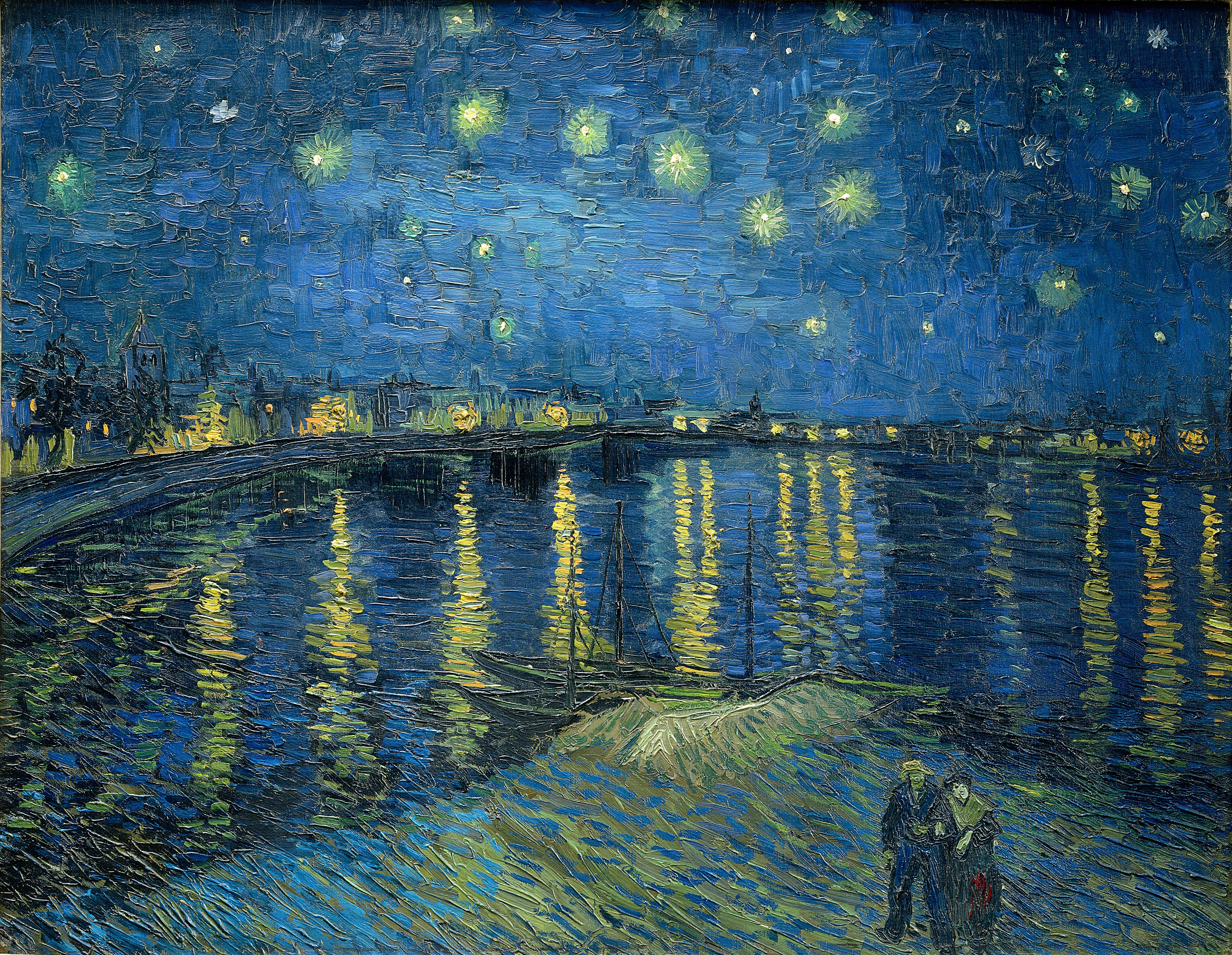
Vincent van Gogh: Starry Night Over the Rhône, 1888

Pierre-Auguste Renoir: Bal du moulin de la Galette, 1876

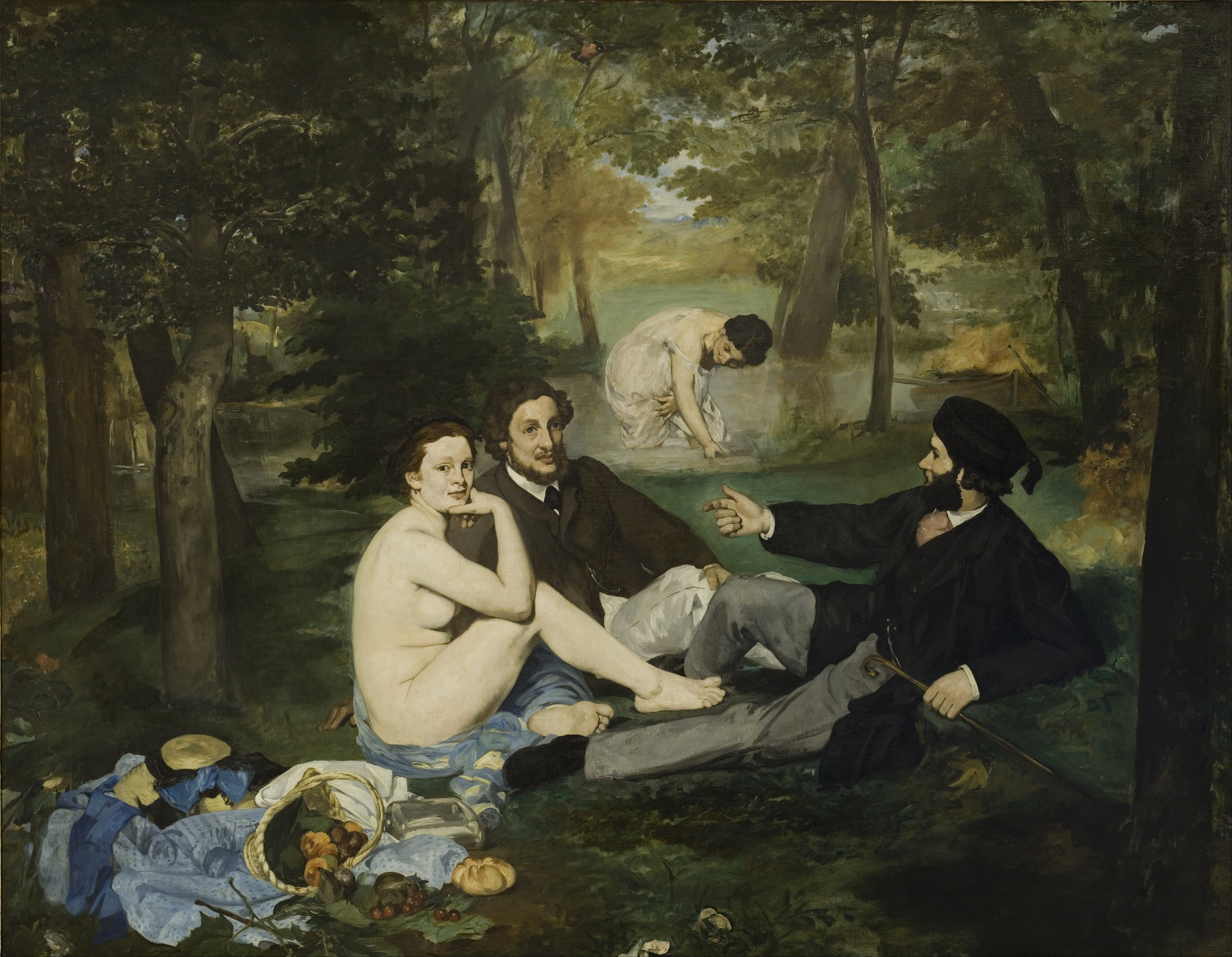
Édouard Manet The Luncheon on the Grass 1862–63

Gustave Courbet: The Artist's Studio 1855

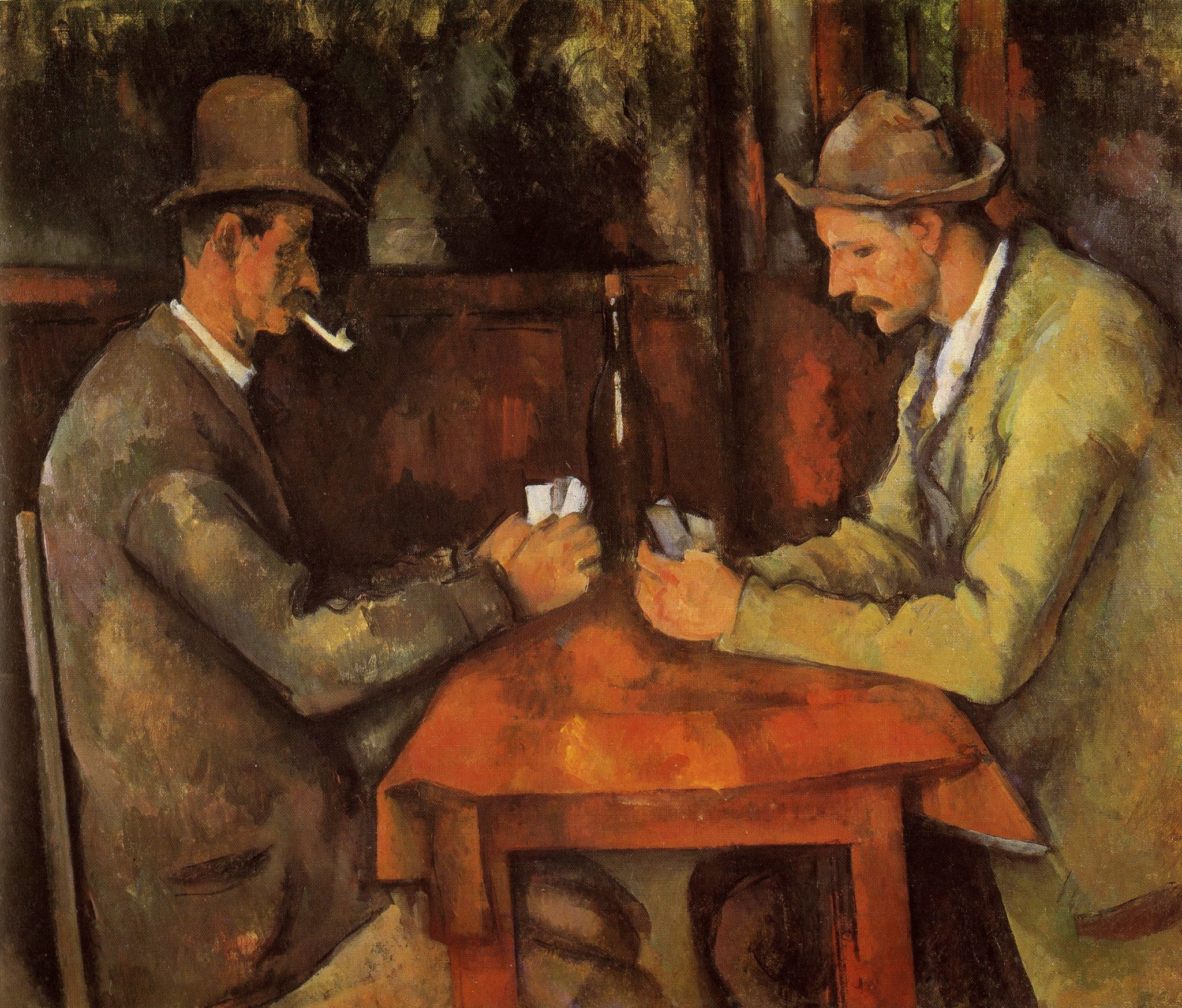
Paul Cézanne: The Card Players 1894–1895

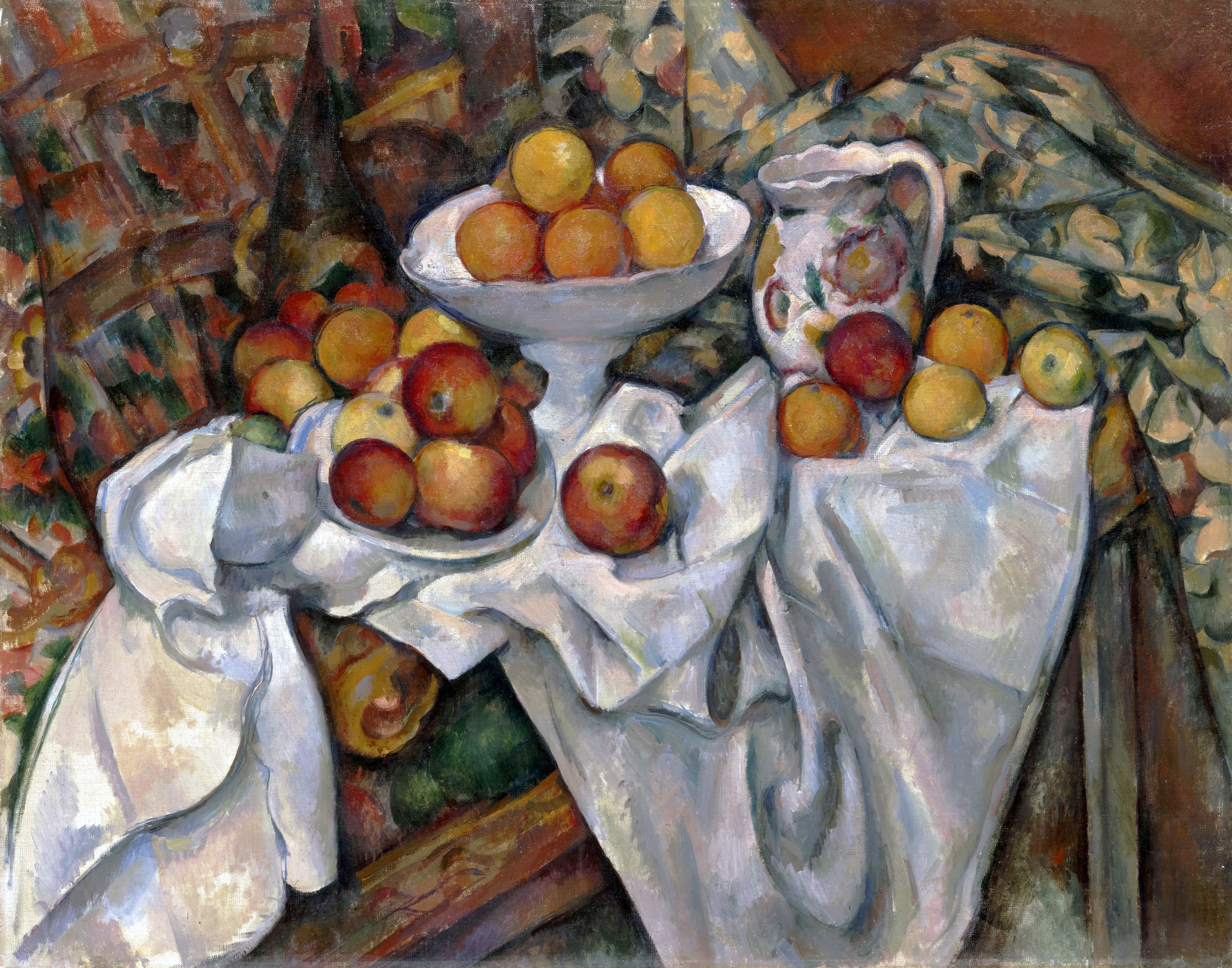
Paul Cézanne: Apples and Oranges c. 1899

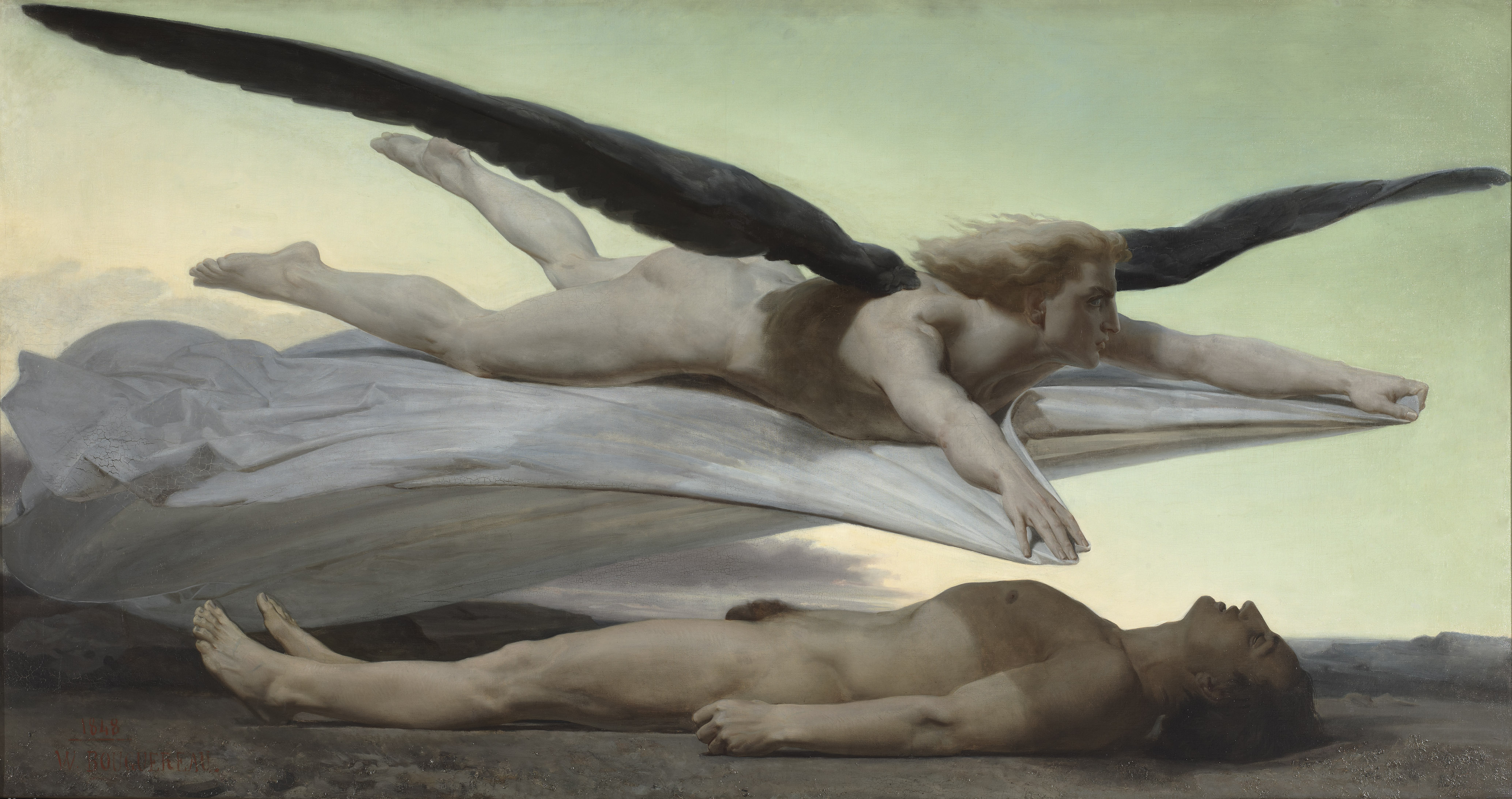
William-Adolphe Bouguereau, Equality Before Death, 1848

=== Paintings: major painters and works represented ===
- Frédéric Bazille – 6 paintings including The Family Reunion, The Improvised Field Hospital, The Pink Dress, Studio in Rue de La Condamine
- Cecilia Beaux – Sita and Sarita (Jeune Fille au Chat)
- Rosa Bonheur – Ploughing in the Nivernais
- Pierre Bonnard – 60 paintings including The Chequered Blouse
- Eugène Boudin – 33 paintings including Trouville Beach
- William-Adolphe Bouguereau – 12 paintings including The Birth of Venus, La Danse, Dante and Virgil
- Louise Catherine Breslau – 4 paintings including Portrait of Henry Davison
- Alexandre Cabanel – The Birth of Venus, The Death of Francesca da Rimini and Paolo Malatesta
- Gustave Caillebotte – 7 paintings including The Floor Scrapers, Boating Party, Vue de toits (Effet de neige)
- Eugène Carrière – 86 paintings including The Painting Family, The Sick Child, Intimacy
- Mary Cassatt – 1 painting
- Paul Cézanne – 56 paintings including Apples and Oranges, The Hanged Man's House, The Card Players, Portrait of Gustave Geffroy
- Théodore Chassériau – 5 paintings (the main collection of his paintings is in the Louvre)
- Pierre Puvis de Chavannes – Young Girls by the Seaside, The Young Mother also known as Charity, View on the Château de Versailles and the Orangerie
- Gustave Courbet – 48 paintings including The Artist's Studio, A Burial at Ornans, Young Man Sitting, L'Origine du monde, Le ruisseau noir, Still-Life with Fruit, The Wave, The Wounded Man
- Jean-Baptiste-Camille Corot – 32 paintings (the main collection of his paintings is in the Louvre) including A Morning. The Dance of the Nymphs
- Henri-Edmond Cross – 10 paintings including The Cypresses in Cagnes
- Leon Dabo – 1 paintings Moore Park
- Henri-Camille Danger – Fleau!
- Charles-François Daubigny – The Harvest
- Honoré Daumier – 8 paintings including The Laundress
- Edgar Degas – 43 works including paintings such as The Parade, also known as Race Horses in front of the Tribunes, The Bellelli Family, The Tub, Portrait of Édouard Manet, Portraits, At the Stock Exchange, L'Absinthe, and pastels like Café-Concert at Les Ambassadeurs and Les Choristes
- Alfred Dehodencq – Boabdil's Farewell to Granada
- Eugène Delacroix – 5 paintings (the main collection of his paintings is in the Louvre)
- Maurice Denis – Portrait of the Artist Aged Eighteen, Princess Maleine's Minuet or Marthe Playing the Piano, The Green Trees or Beech Trees in Kerduel, October Night (panel for the decoration of a girl's room), Homage to Cézanne
- André Derain – Charing Cross Bridge, also known as Westminster Bridge
- Édouard Detaille – The Dream
- André Devambez – The Charge
- Albert Edelfelt – Pasteur's portrait by Edelfelt
- Henri Fantin-Latour – Around the Piano, A Studio at Les Batignolles
- Paul Gauguin – 24 paintings including Arearea, Tahitian Women on the Beach
- Jean-Léon Gérôme – Portrait of the Baroness Nathaniel de Rothschild, Reception of Condé in Versailles, La Comtesse de Keller, The Cock Fight, Jerusalem
- Vincent van Gogh – 24 paintings including L'Arlésienne, Bedroom in Arles, Self Portrait, portrait of his friend Eugène Boch, The Siesta, The Church at Auvers, View from the Chevet, The Italian Woman, Starry Night, Portrait of Dr. Gachet, Doctor Gachet's Garden in Auvers, Imperial Fritillaries in a Copper Vase, Saint-Paul Asylum, Saint-Rémy, Self-portrait
- Armand Guillaumin – 44 paintings
- Ferdinand Hodler – Der Holzfäller (The Woodcutter)
- Winslow Homer – Summer Night
- Jean Auguste Dominique Ingres – 4 paintings (the main collection of his paintings is in the Louvre) including The Source
- Eugène Jansson – Proletarian Lodgings
- Johan Barthold Jongkind – 9 paintings
- Gustav Klimt – 1 painting
- Maximilien Luce – The Quai Saint-Michel and Notre-Dame
- Édouard Manet – 34 paintings including Olympia, The Balcony, Berthe Morisot With a Bouquet of Violets, The Luncheon on the Grass, The Fifer, The Reading
- Henri Matisse – Luxe, Calme et Volupté
- Gustave Doré – Master of Imagination collection
- Jean-François Millet – 27 paintings including The Angelus, Spring, The Gleaners
- Piet Mondrian – 2 paintings
- Claude Monet – 86 paintings (another main collection of his paintings is in the Musée Marmottan Monet) including The Saint-Lazare Station, The Rue Montorgueil in Paris. Celebration of 30 June 1878, Wind Effect, Series of The Poplars, Rouen Cathedral. Harmony in Blue, Blue Water Lilies, Le Déjeuner sur l'herbe, Haystacks, The Magpie, Women in the Garden
- Gustave Moreau – 8 paintings including L'Apparition
- Berthe Morisot – 9 paintings
- Henri-Paul Motte – The Fiancée of Belus
- Edvard Munch – 1 painting
- Henri Ottmann – The Luxembourg Station in Brussels
- Camille Pissarro – 46 paintings including White Frost
- Odilon Redon – 106 paintings including Caliban
- Henri Regnault – Summary Execution under the Moorish Kings of Granada
- Pierre-Auguste Renoir – 81 paintings including Bal au moulin de la Galette, Montmartre, The Bathers, Dance in the City, Dance in the Country, Frédéric Bazille at his Easel, Girls at the Piano, The Swing
- Alfred Philippe Roll – The Young Republic
- Henri Rousseau – 3 paintings
- Théo van Rysselberghe – 6 paintings
- Paul Sérusier – The Talisman, the Aven River at the Bois d'Amour
- Georges Seurat – 19 paintings including The Circus
- Paul Signac – 16 paintings including Women at the Well
- Alfred Sisley – 46 paintings including Inondation at Port-Marly
- Henri de Toulouse-Lautrec – 18 paintings including La Toilette
- Félix Vallotton – Misia at Her Dressing Table
- Édouard Vuillard – 70 paintings
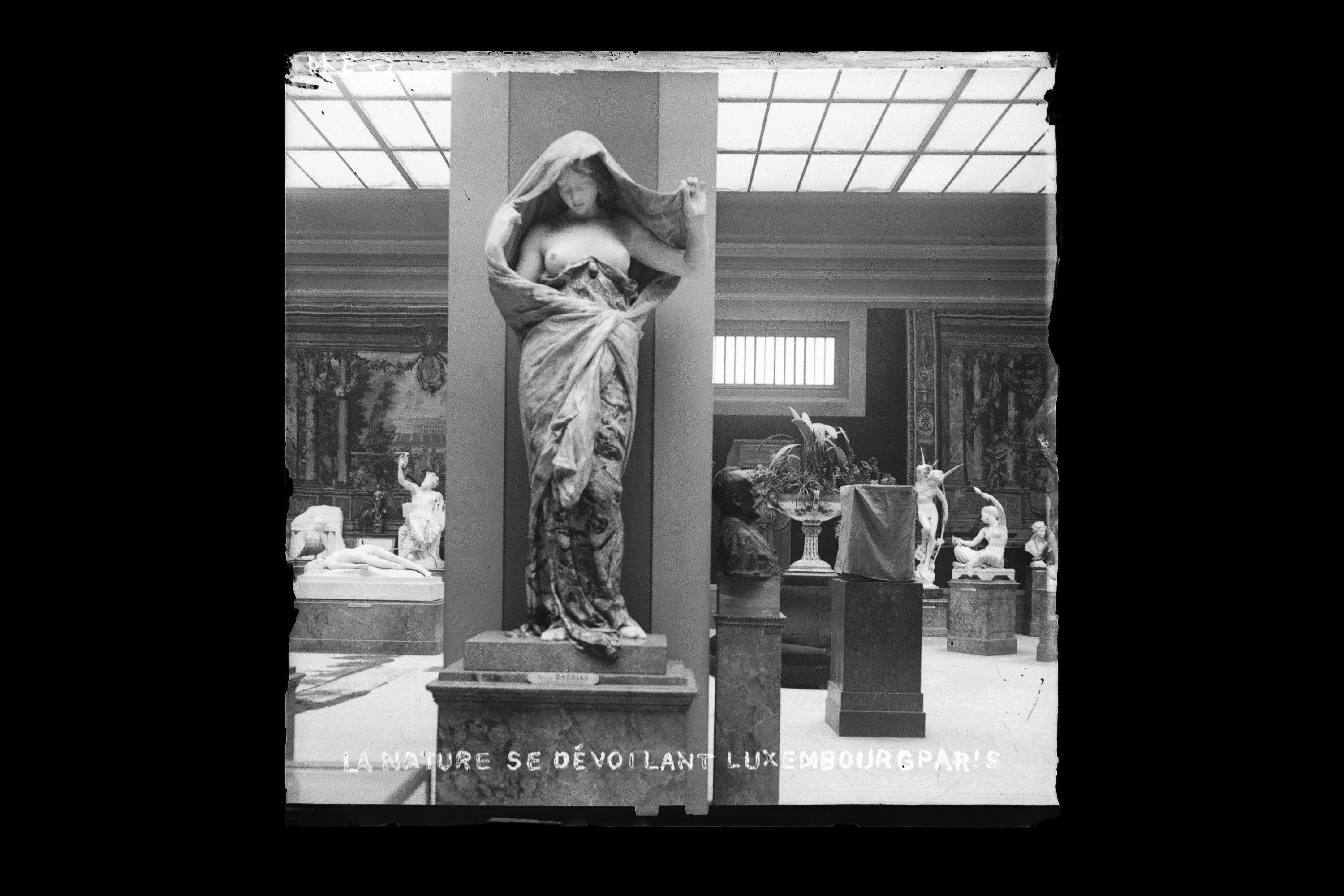
- Ernest Barrias, Nature Unveiling Herself, 1899
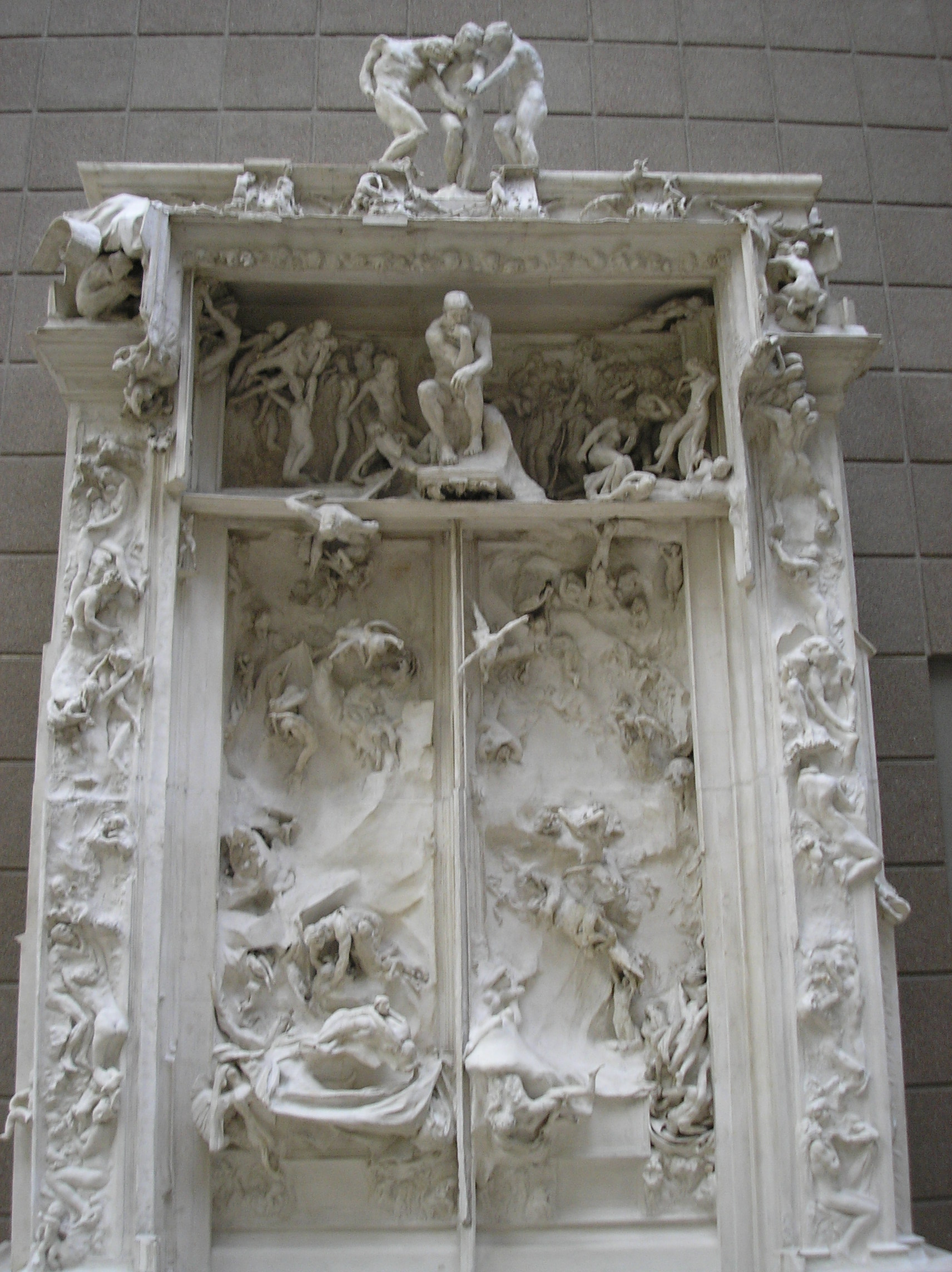
  Auguste Rodin, The Gates of Hell
  James McNeill Whistler – 3 paintings including Arrangement in Grey and Black: The Artist's Mother, also known as Whistler's Mother

=== Sculptures ===
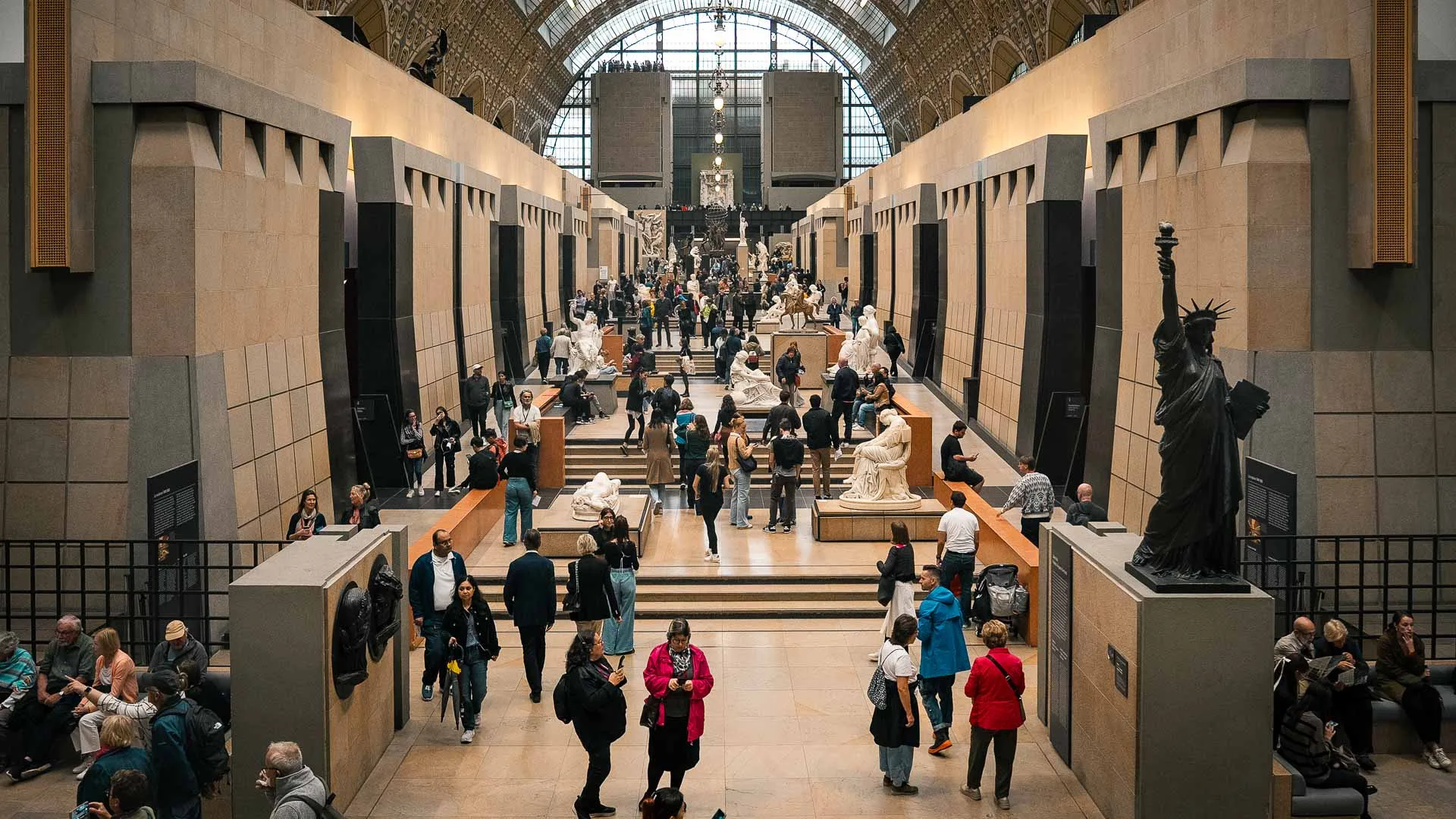
A view of the main room on level O of the Musée d'Orsay, Paris, showcasing the sculptures on display.

Sculpture was in high demand in the 19th century and became widely used as a way to display a person's social and political standings. The style and ideology represented by many of the sculptures were out of fashion by the mid-20th century, and the sculptures were put into storage. It wasn't until the conversion of the Orsay railway station into the Musée d'Orsay museum in the 1970s that many sculptures from the 19th century were placed on exhibit again. The substantial nave inside the new museum offered a perfect area for the display of sculptures. During the grand opening of the museum in December 1986, there were 1,200 sculptures on display, brought in from collections such as the Louvre, state loans, and the Musée du Luxembourg. The museum also obtained more than 200 sculptures before opening through donations from art connoisseurs, the lineage of artists, and people in support of the Musée d'Orsay.

Since the grand opening in 1986, the museum has collected works from exchanges that other museums or institutions once showcased such as Nature Unveiling Herself Before Science by Louis-Ernest Barrias that was initially commissioned for Conservatoire des Arts et Métiers, as well as The Thinker and The Gates of Hell by Auguste Rodin. The museum also purchases specific works to fill gaps and finish the collections already in the museum such as one of the panels of Be Mysterious by Paul Gauguin, the full set of Honoré Daumier's Célébrités du Juste Milieu, and Maturity by Camille Claudel. There are currently more than 2,200 sculptures in the Musée d'Orsay.

Major sculptors represented in the collection include Alfred Barye, François Rude, Jules Cavelier, Jean-Baptiste Carpeaux, Émile-Coriolan Guillemin, Auguste Rodin, Paul Gauguin, Camille Claudel, Sarah Bernhardt, Aristide Maillol and Honoré Daumier.

=== Other works ===
It also holds collections of architecture and decorative arts, as well as photography.

== Selected collection highlights ==
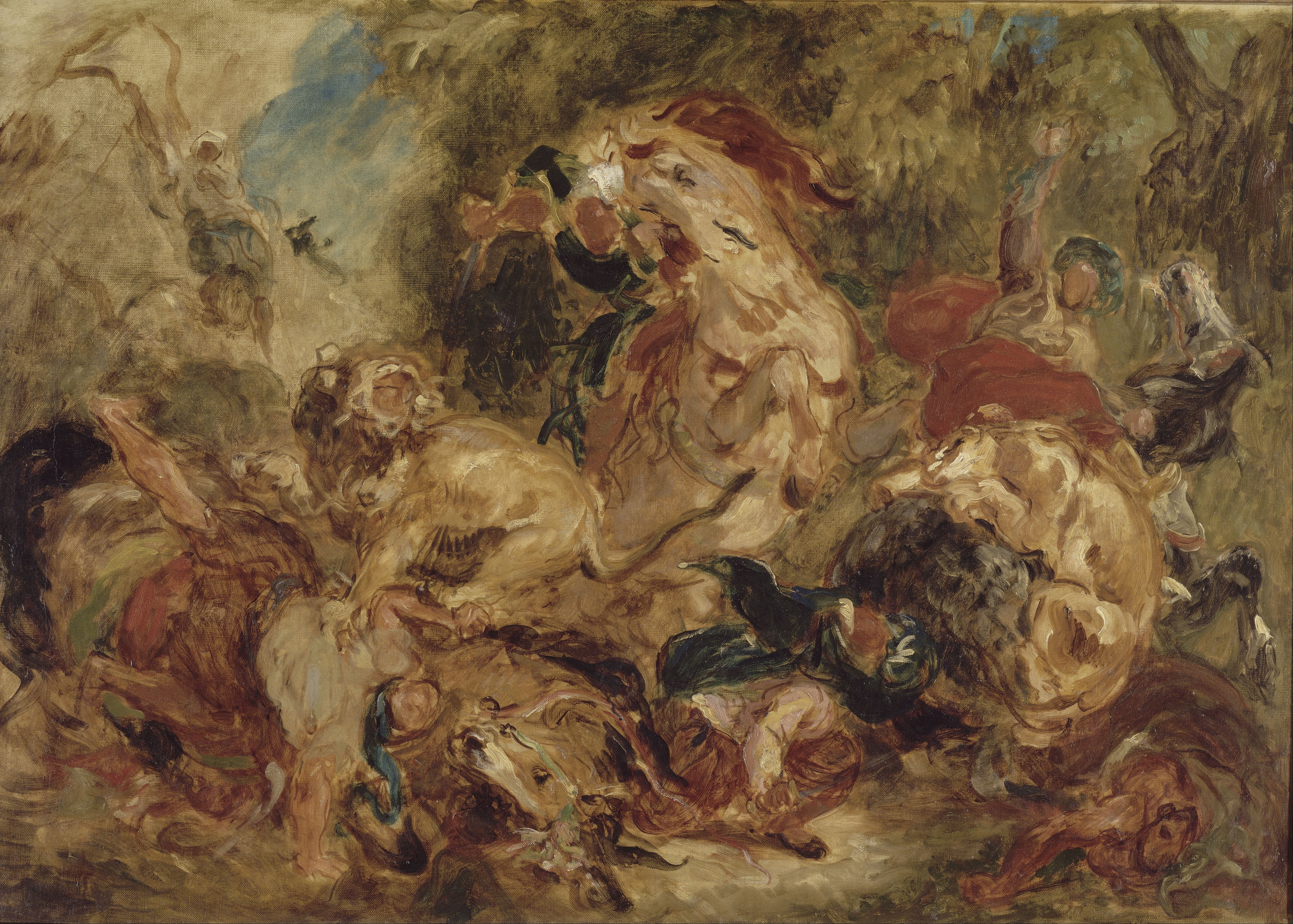
Eugène Delacroix, The Lion Hunt, c. 1854

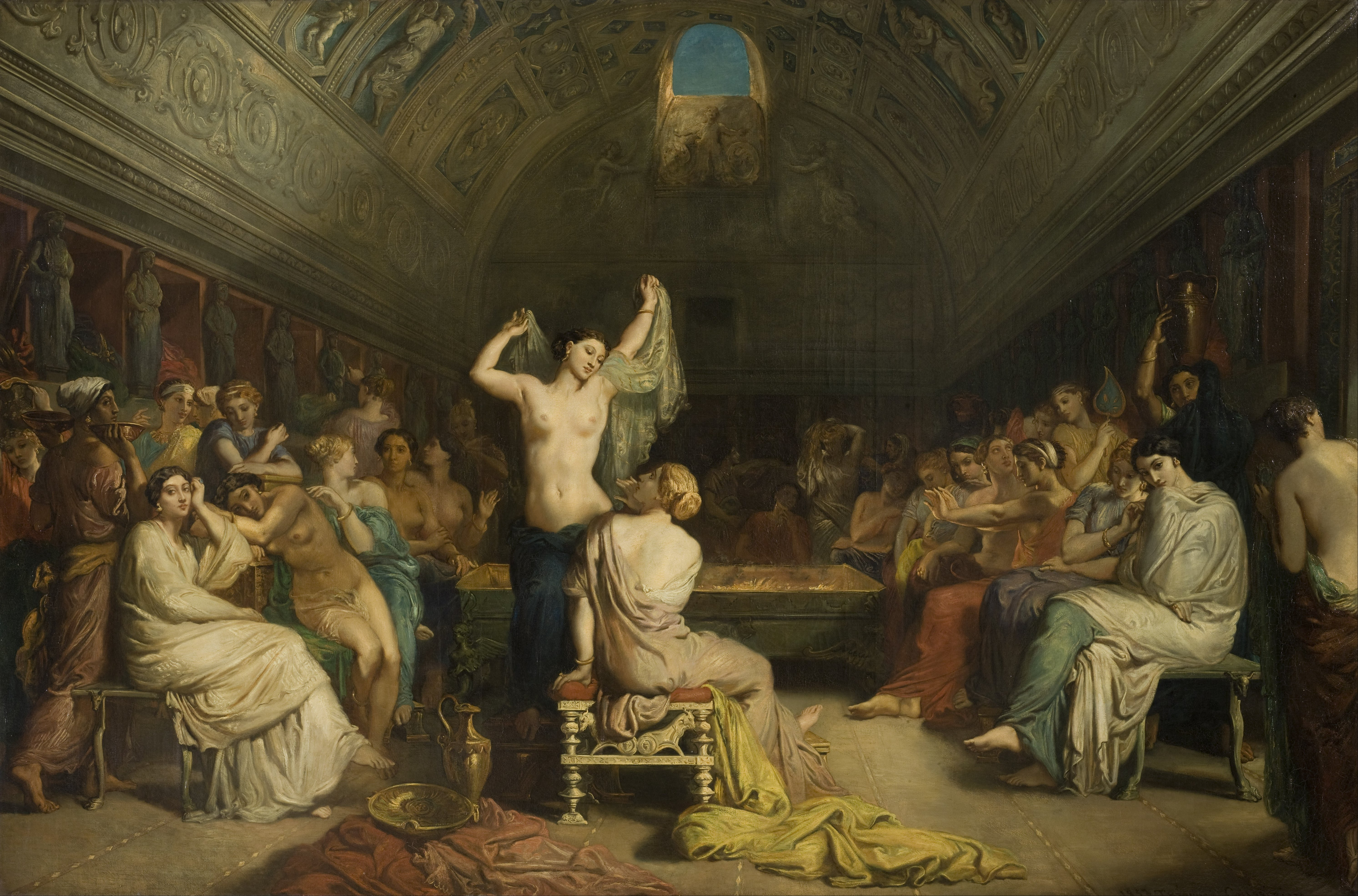
Théodore Chassériau, Tepidarium, 1853

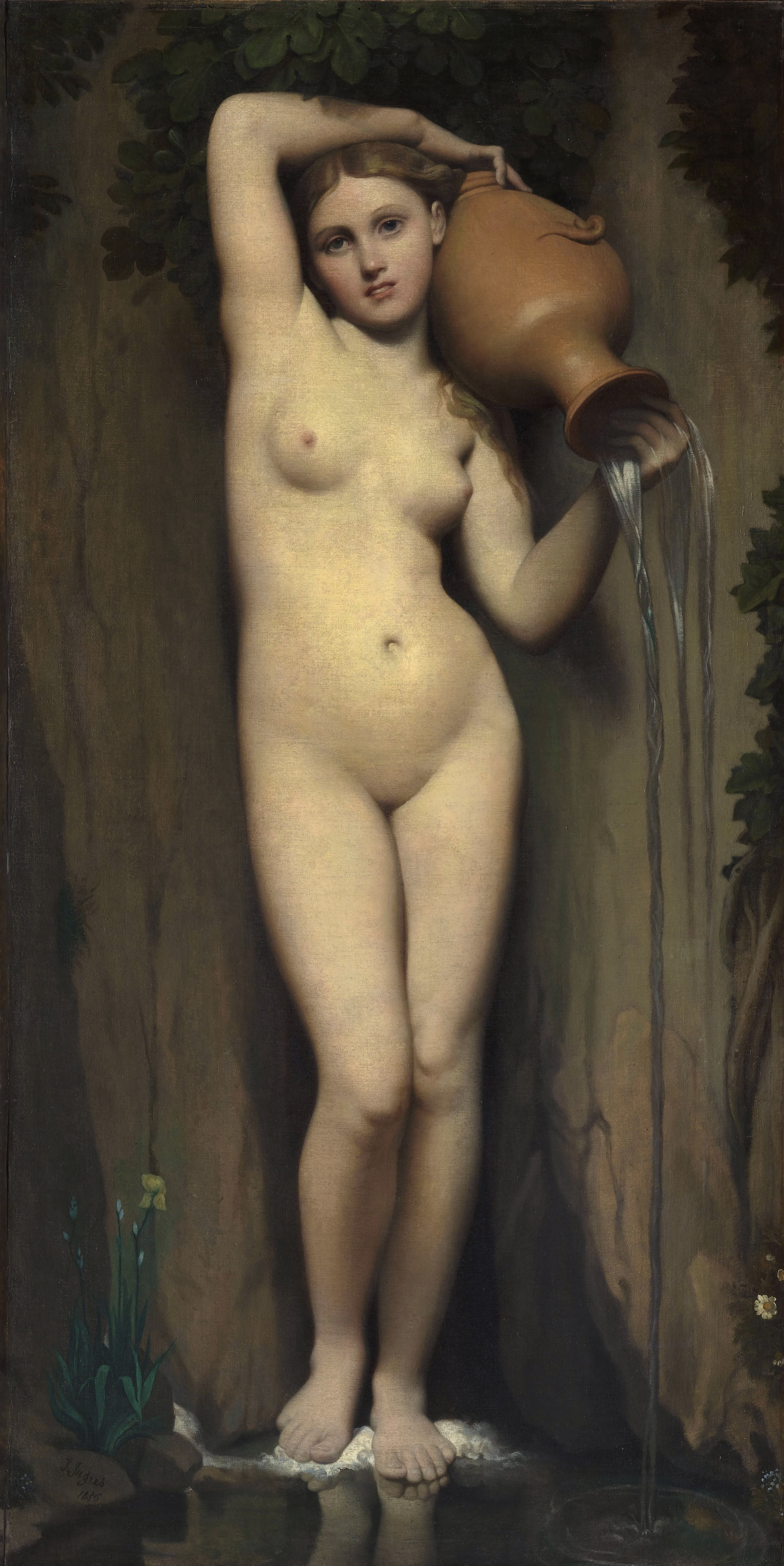
Jean Auguste Dominique Ingres, The Source, 1856

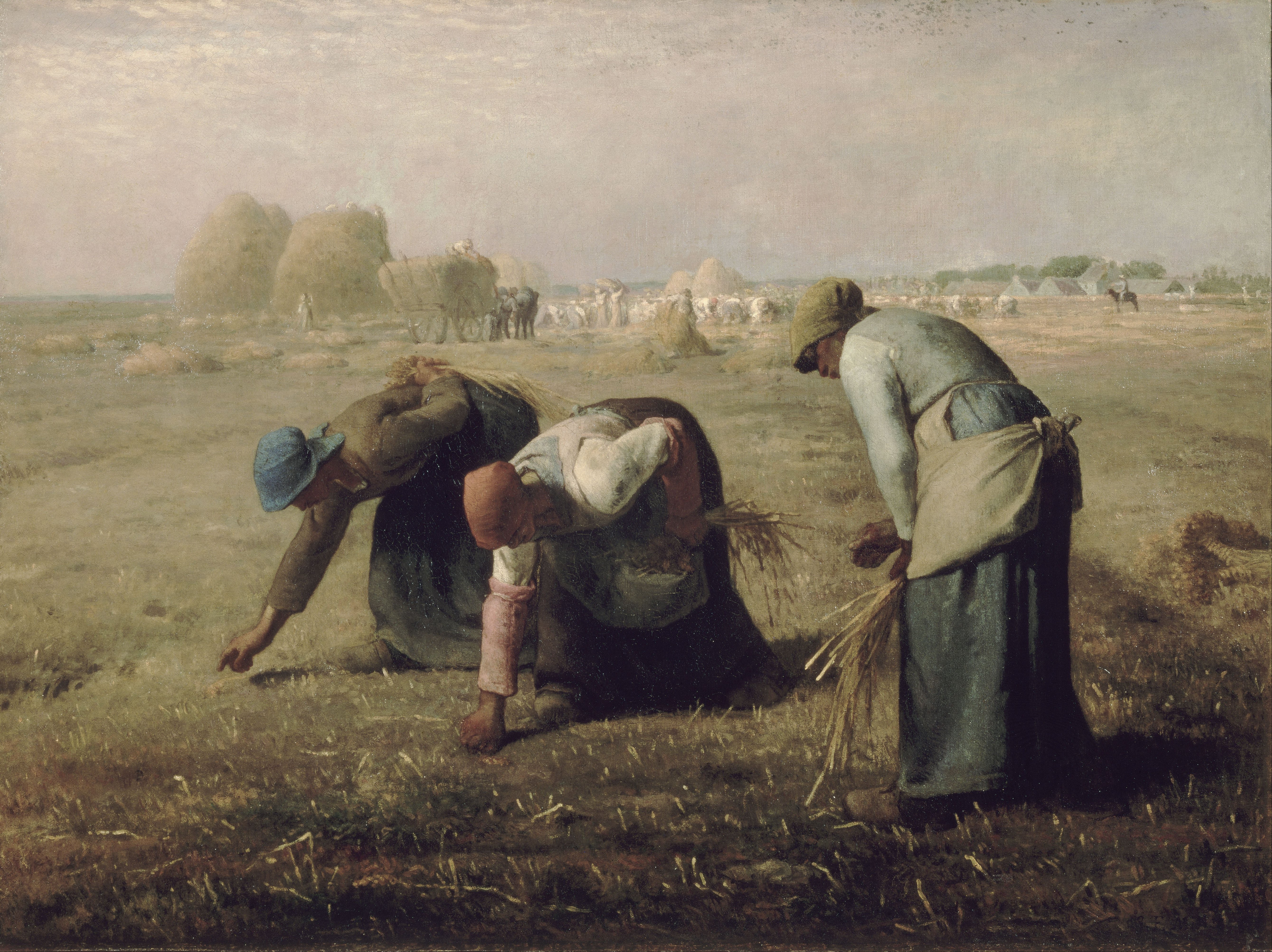
Jean-François Millet, The Gleaners, 1857

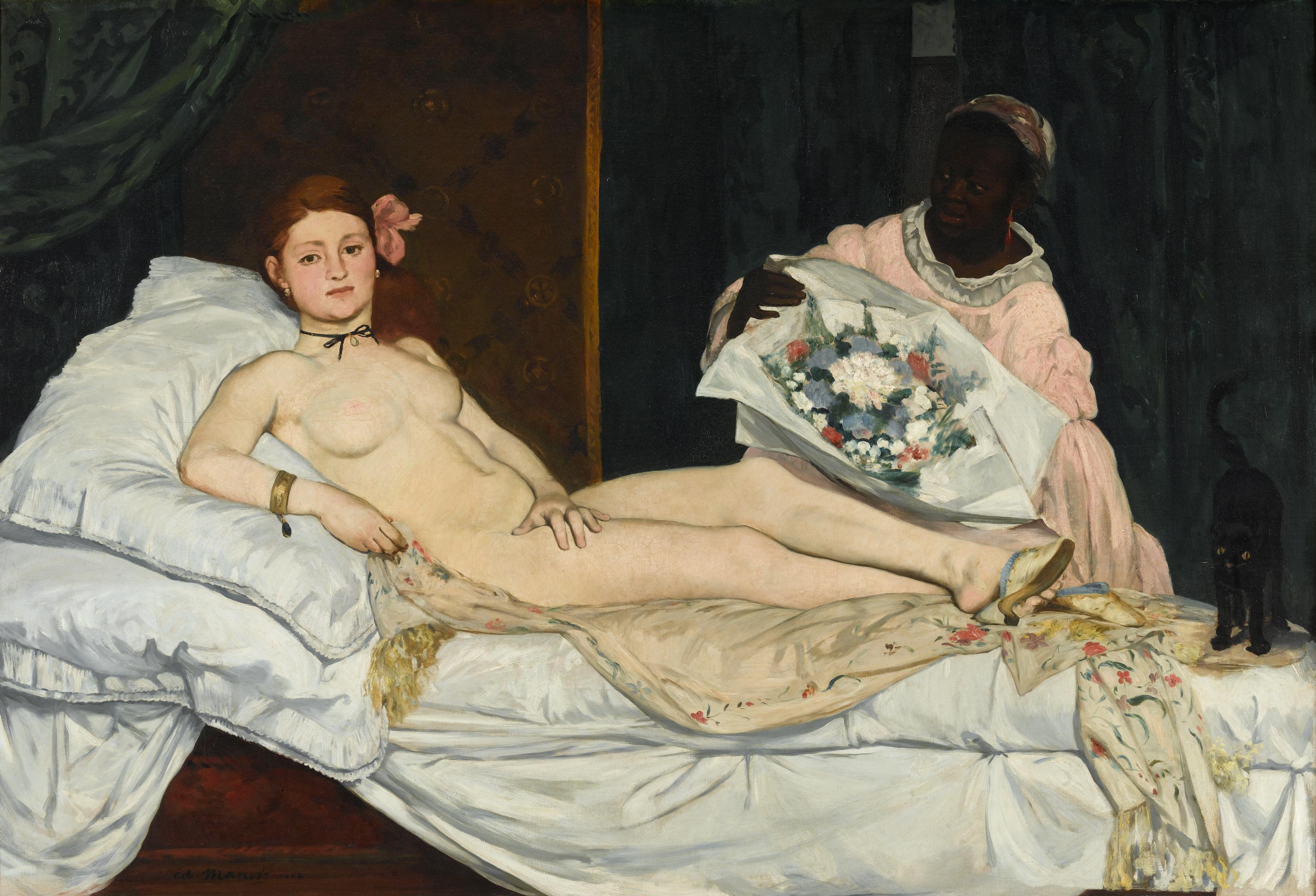
Édouard Manet, Olympia, 1863

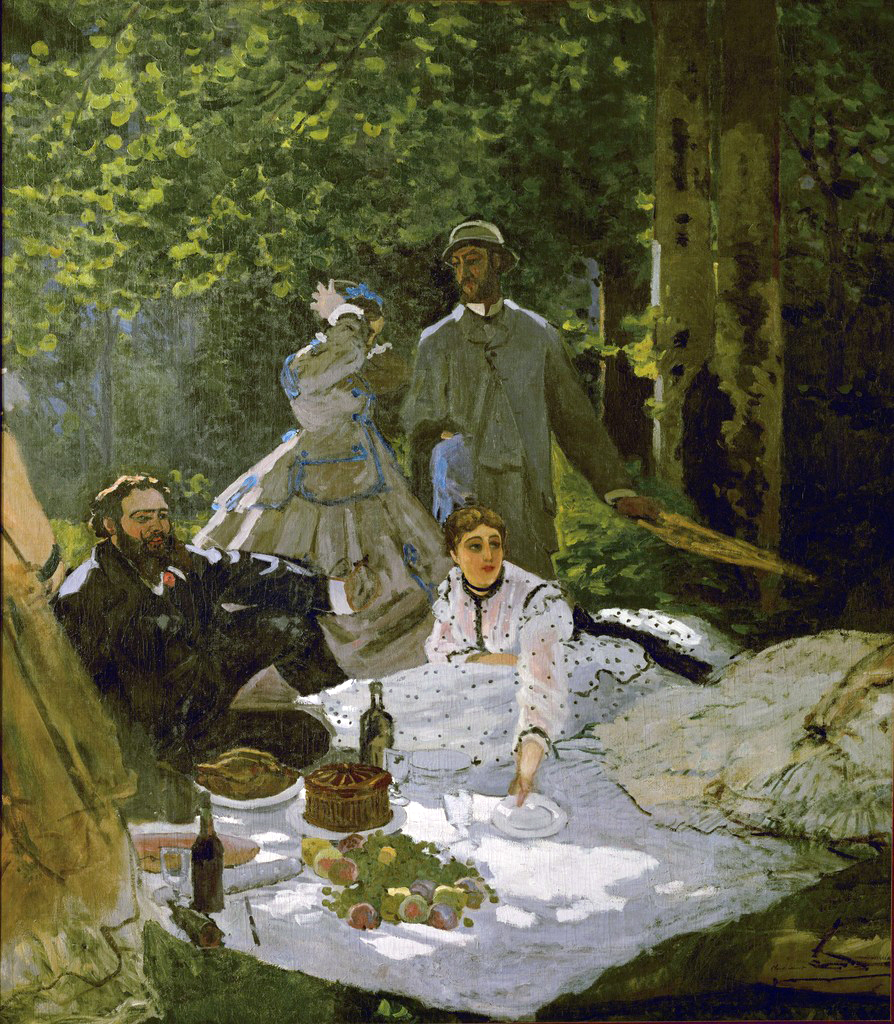
Claude Monet, Le déjeuner sur l'herbe, (right section), includes Gustave Courbet, 1865–1866

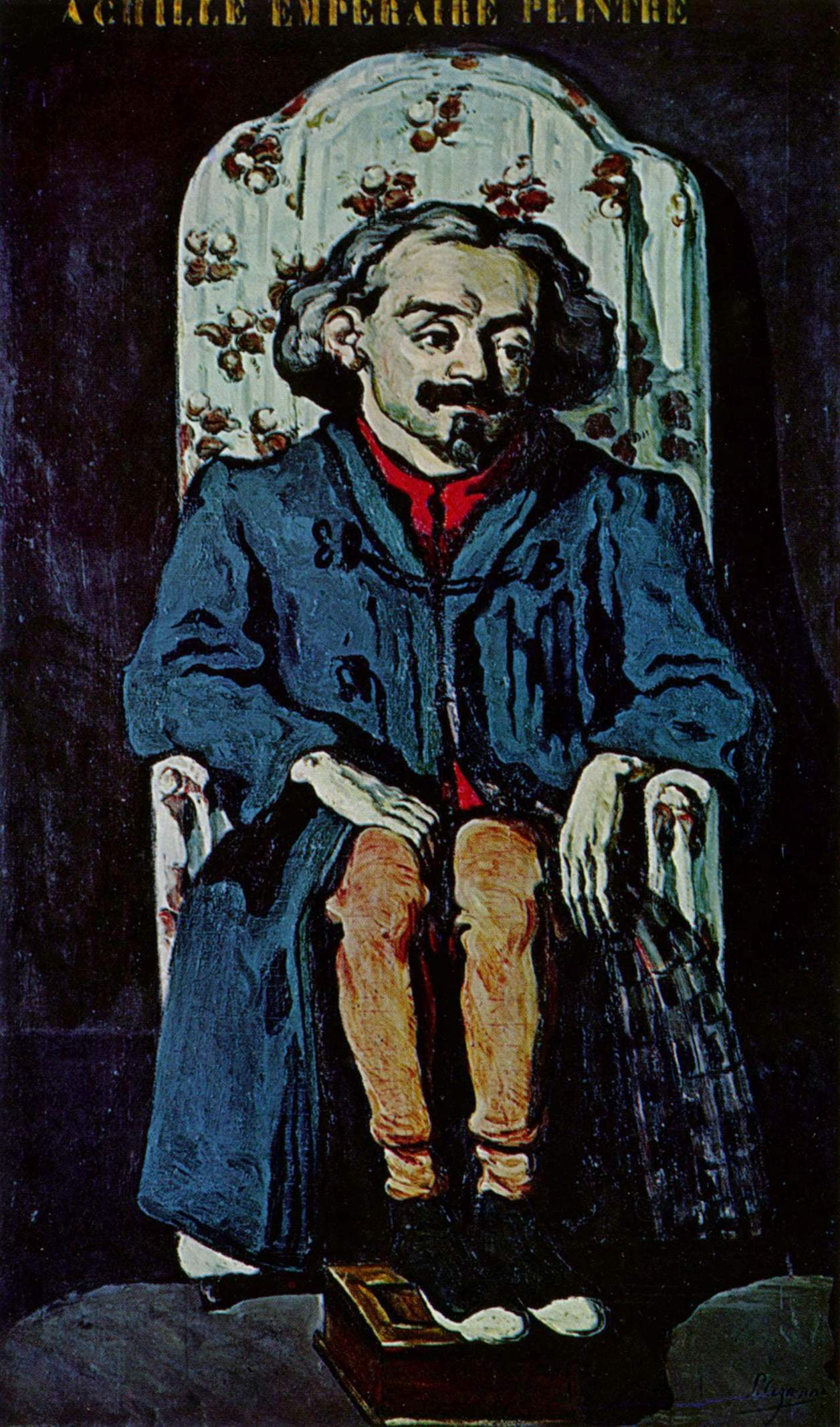
Paul Cézanne, Portrait of Achille Emperaire, 1868

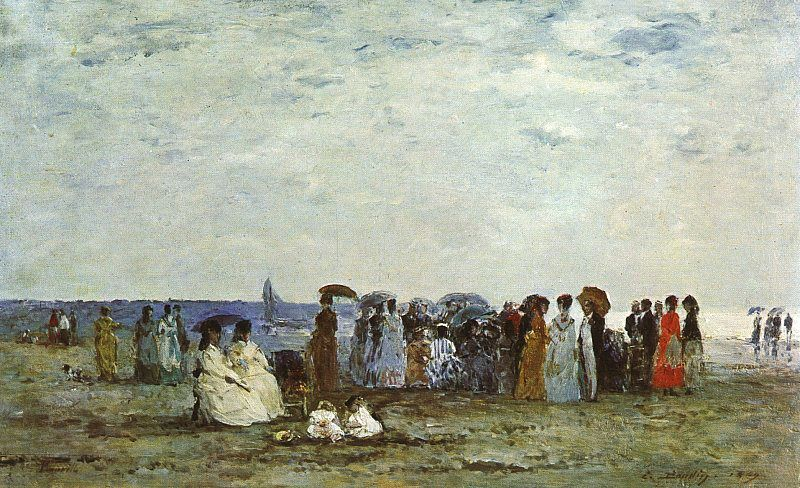
Eugène Boudin, Bathers on the Beach at Trouville, 1869

James McNeill Whistler, Whistler's Mother, 1871

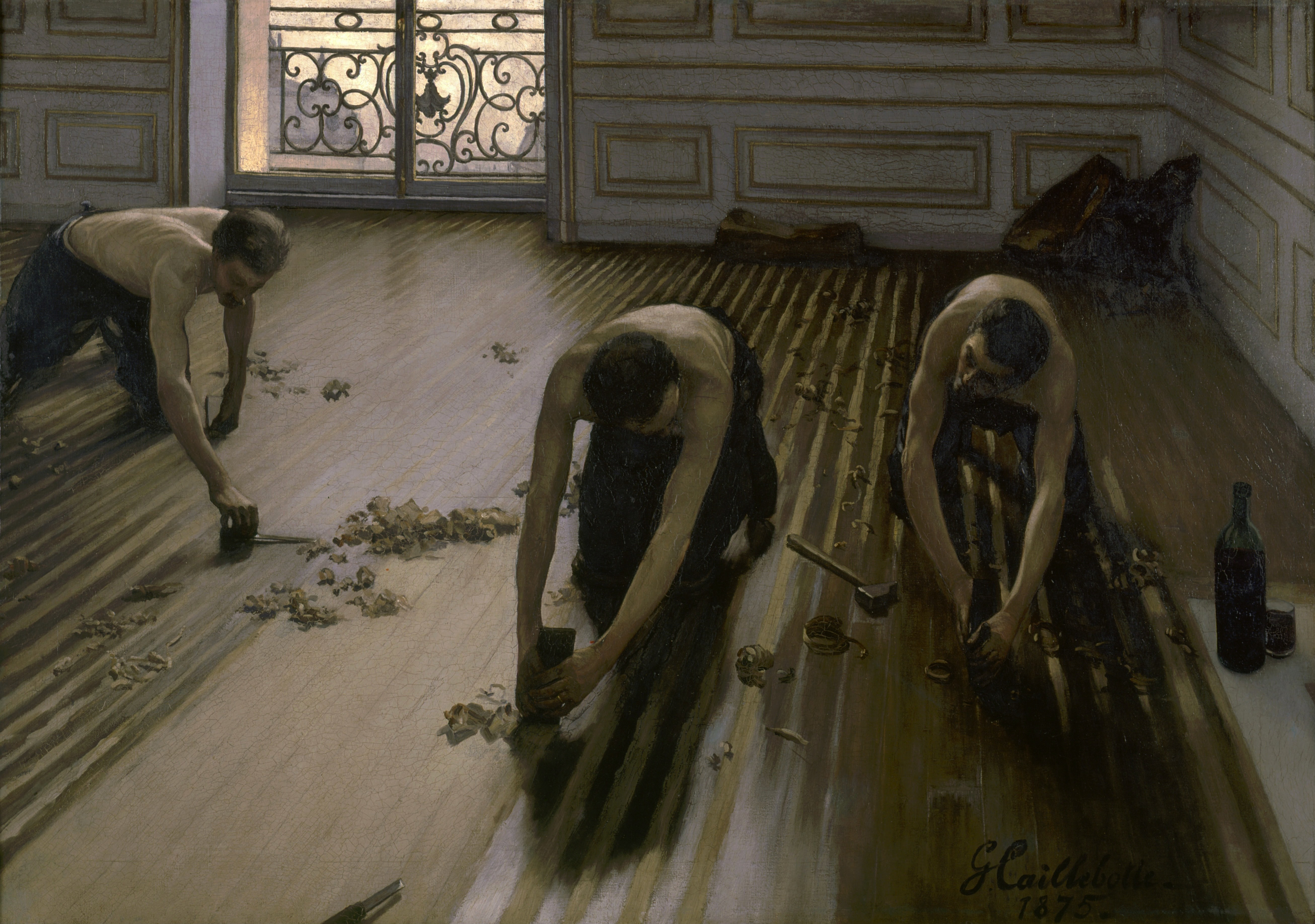
Gustave Caillebotte, Les raboteurs de parquet (The Floor Scrapers), 1875

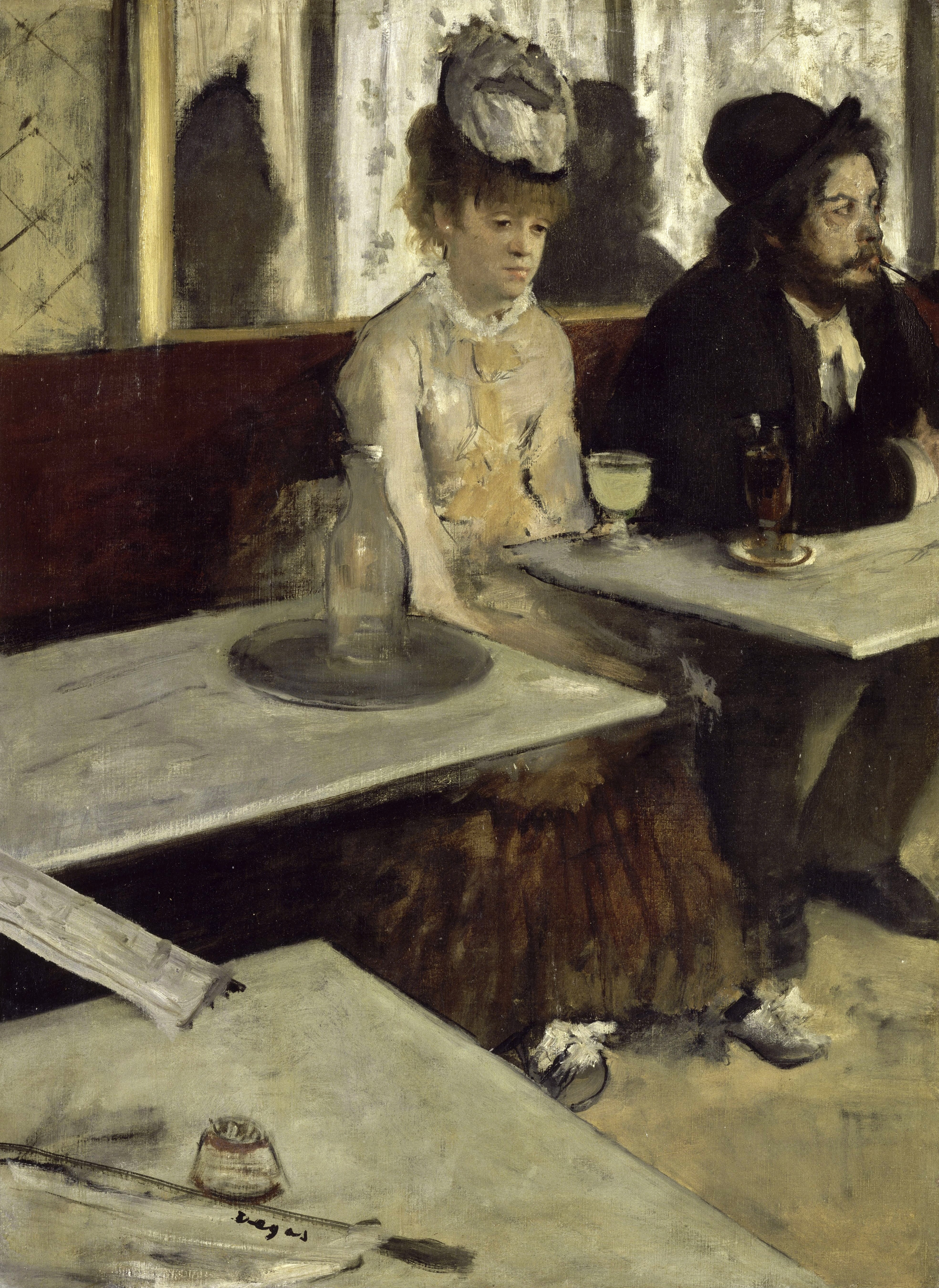
Edgar Degas, L'Absinthe, 1876

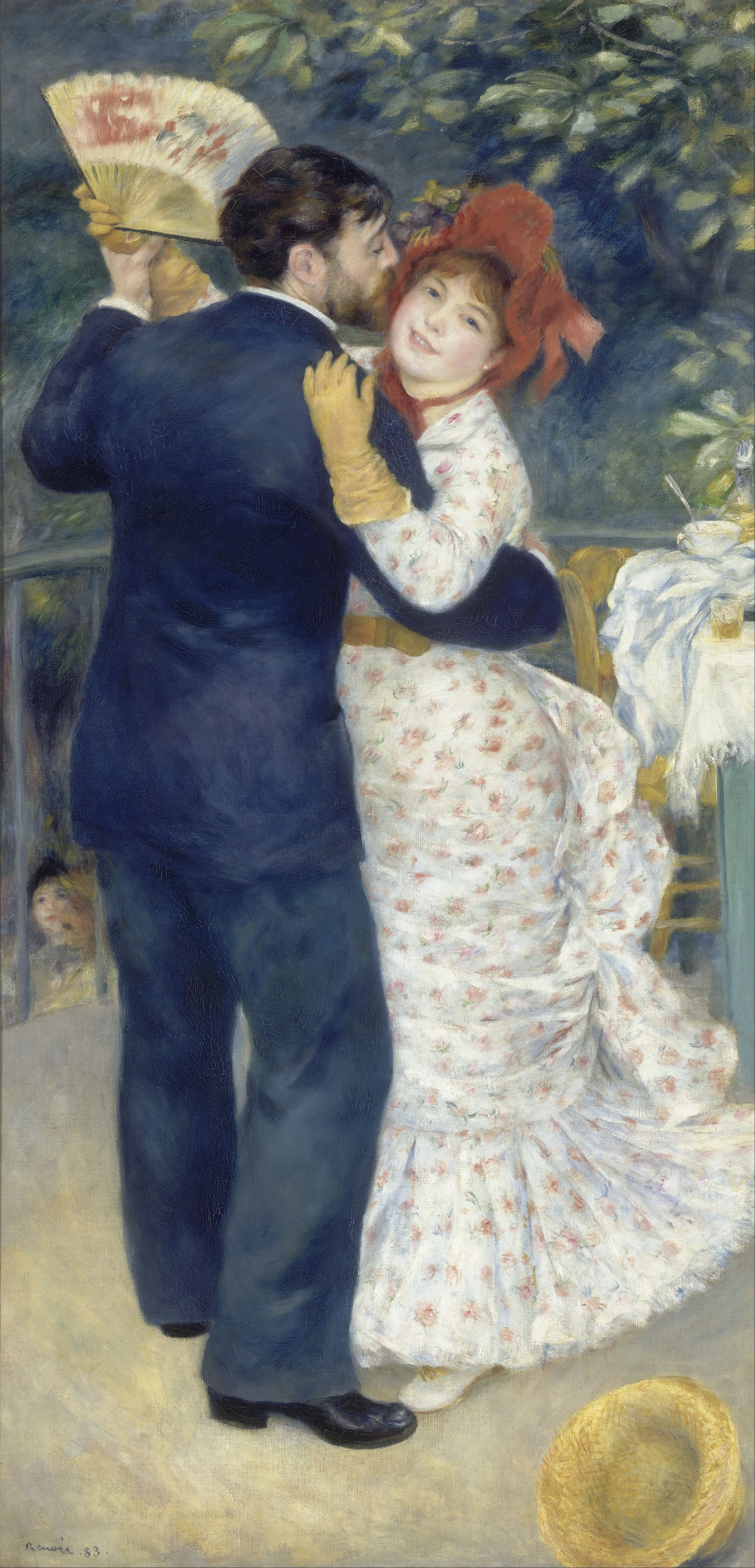
Pierre-Auguste Renoir, Dance in the Country (Aline Charigot and Paul Lhote), 1883

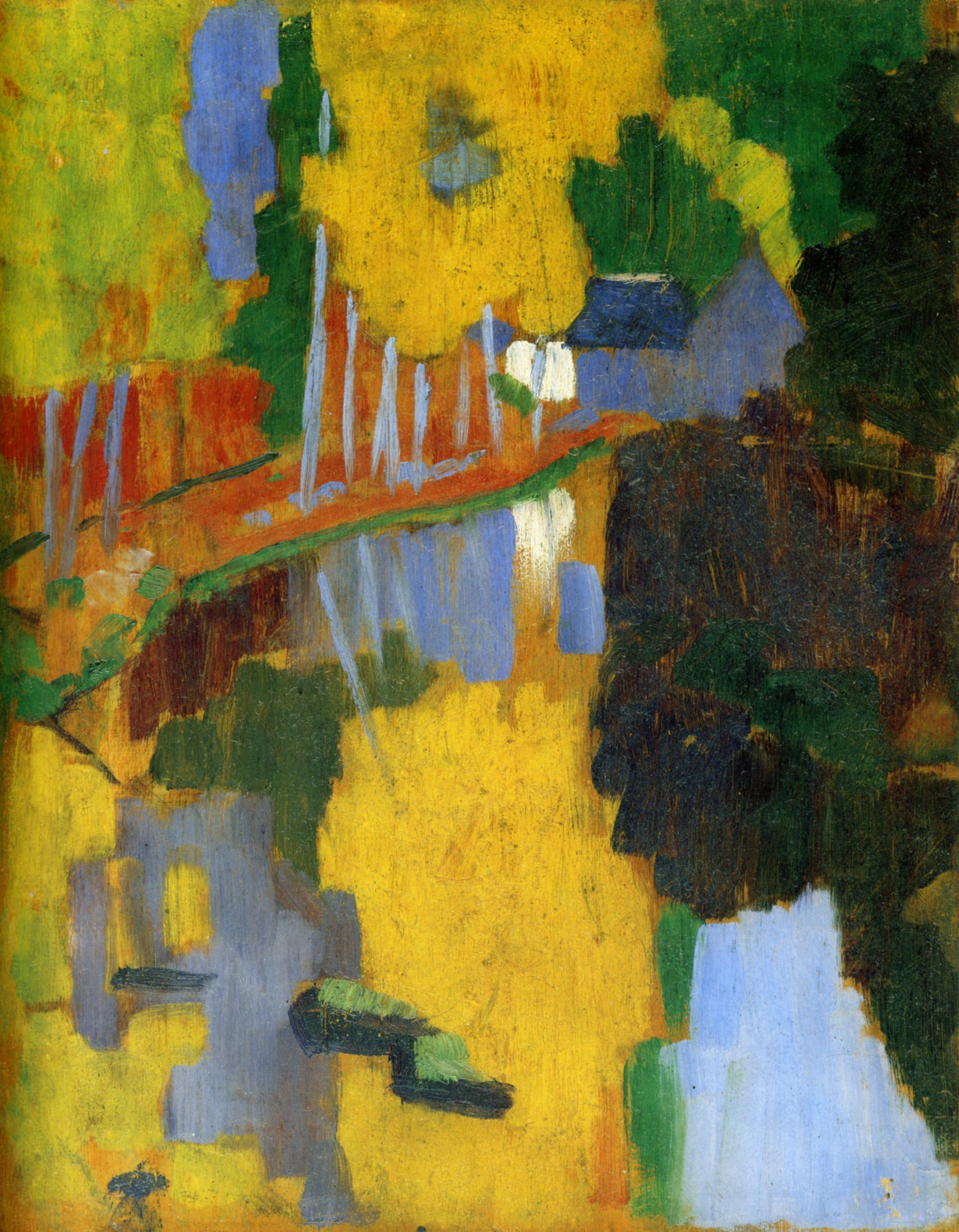
Paul Sérusier, The Talisman/Le Talisman, 1888

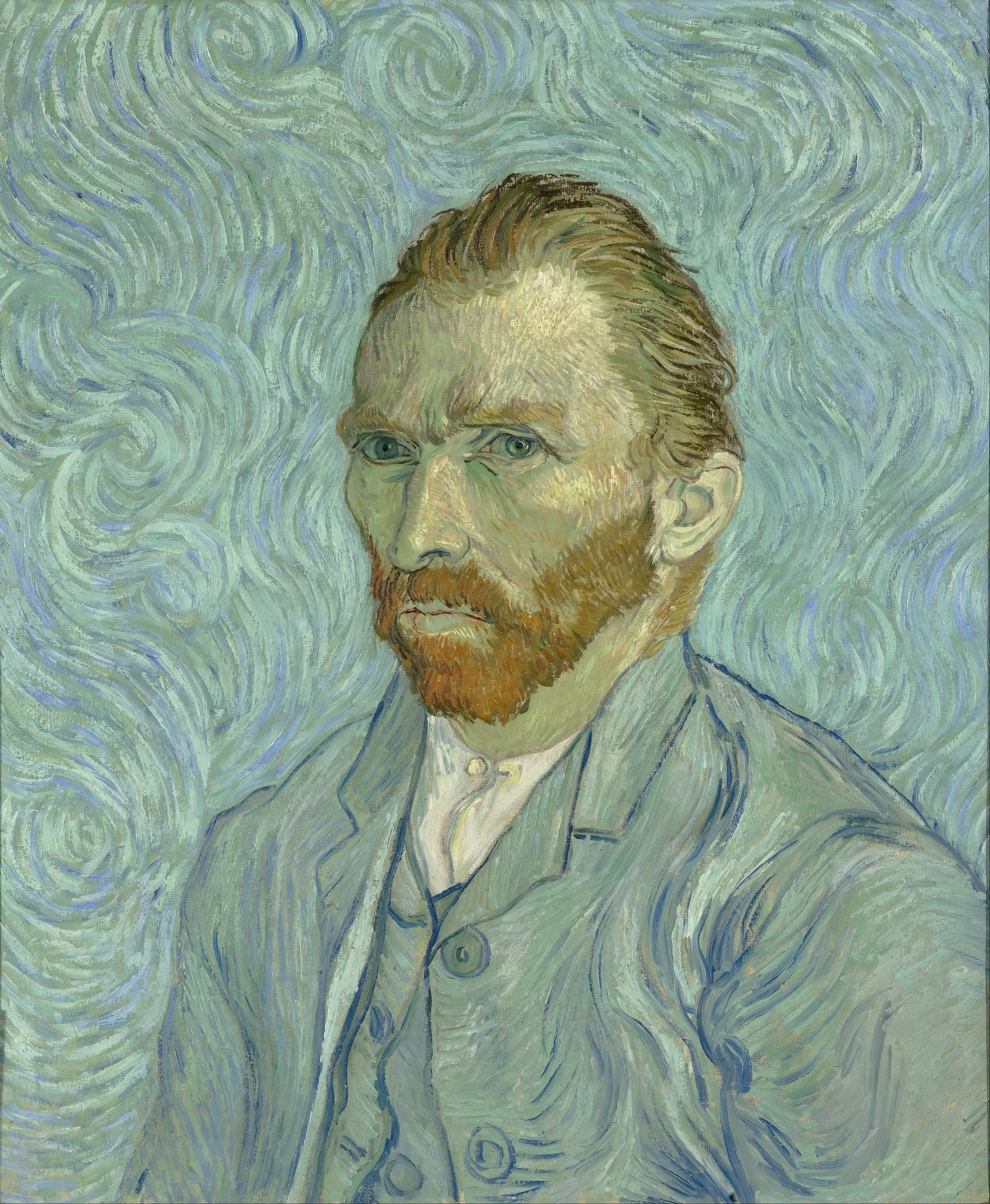
Self-portrait (1889) by Vincent van Gogh

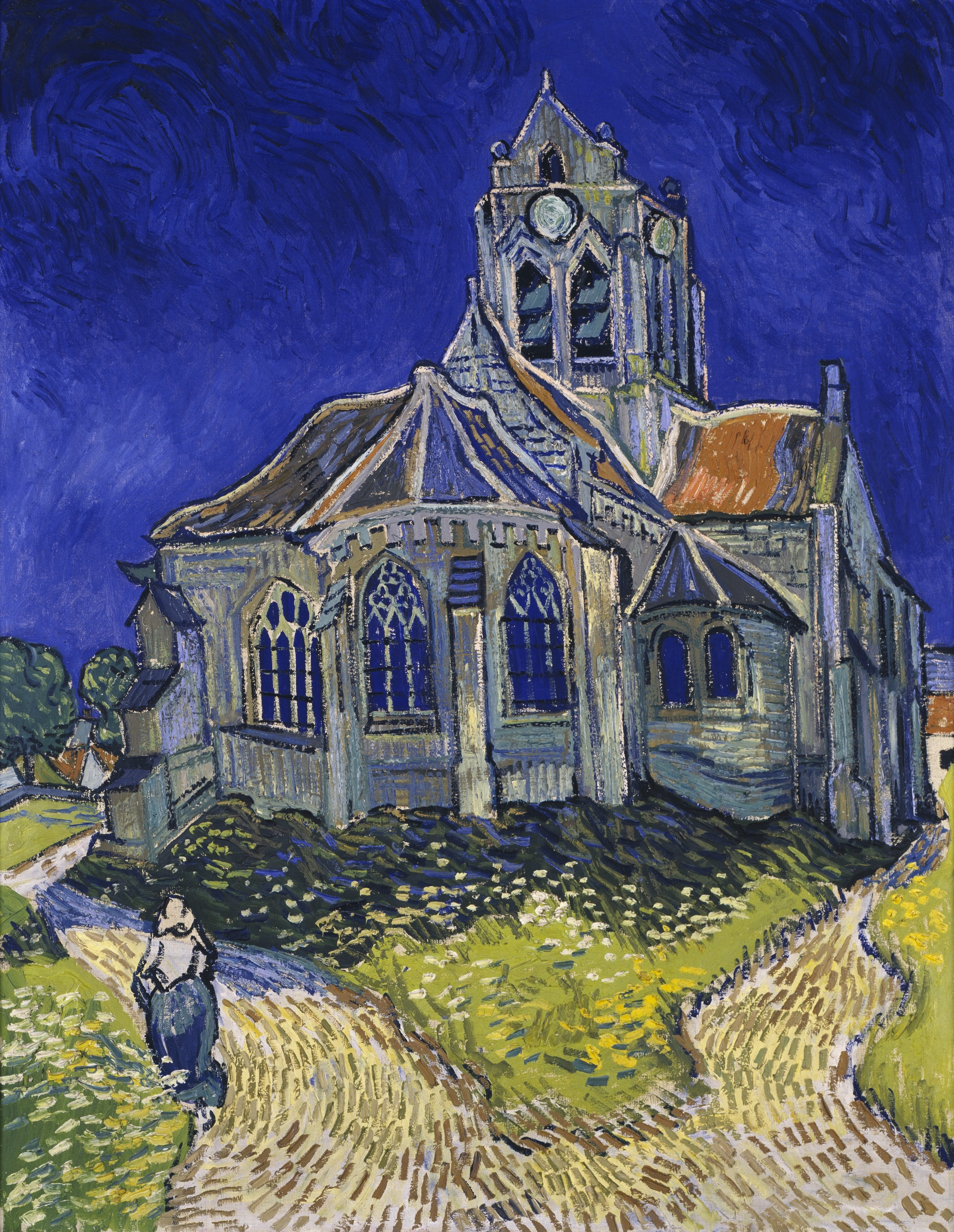
Vincent van Gogh, The Church at Auvers, 1890

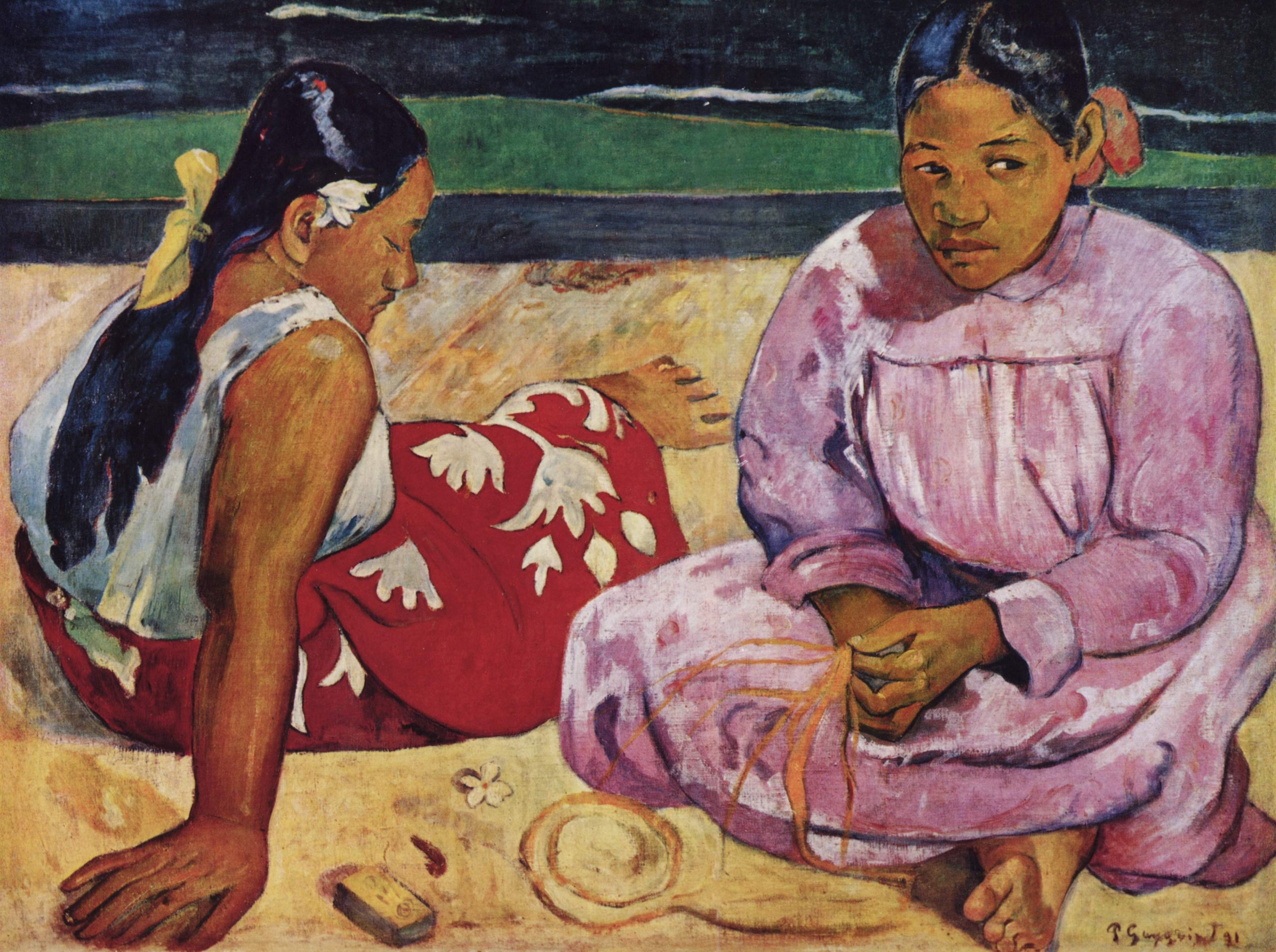
Paul Gauguin, Tahitian Women on the Beach, 1891

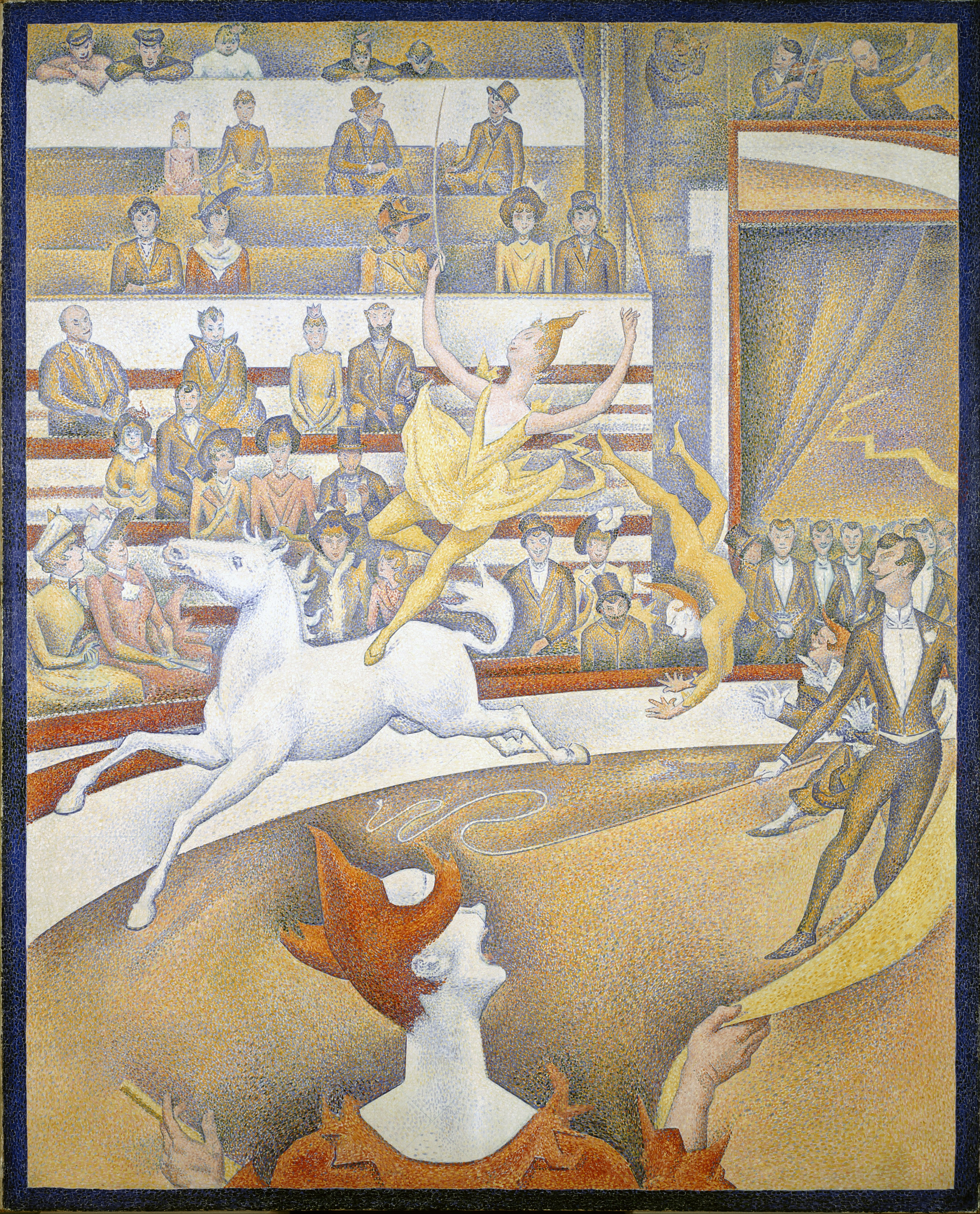
Georges Seurat, The Circus, 1891

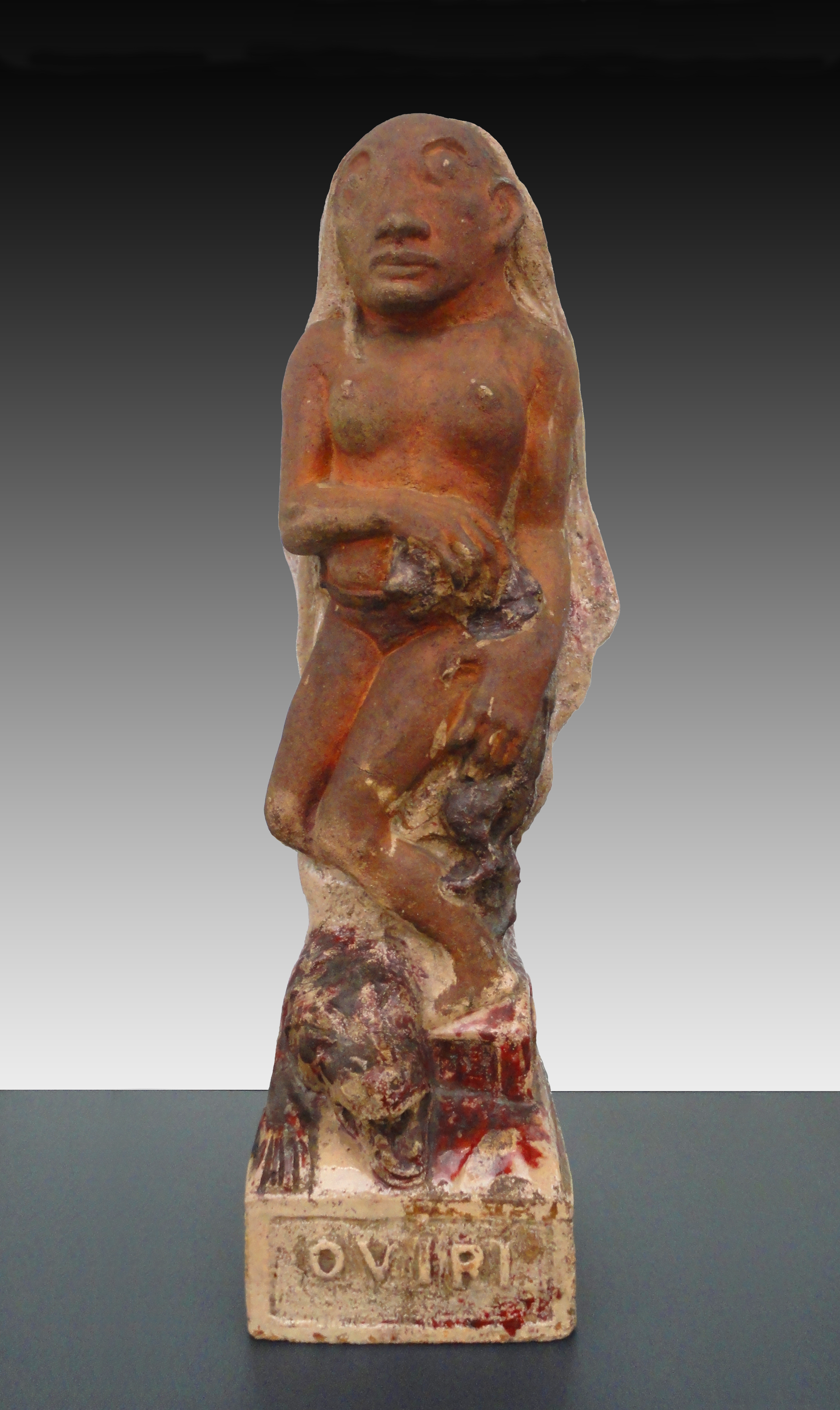
Paul Gauguin, Oviri (Sauvage), 1894

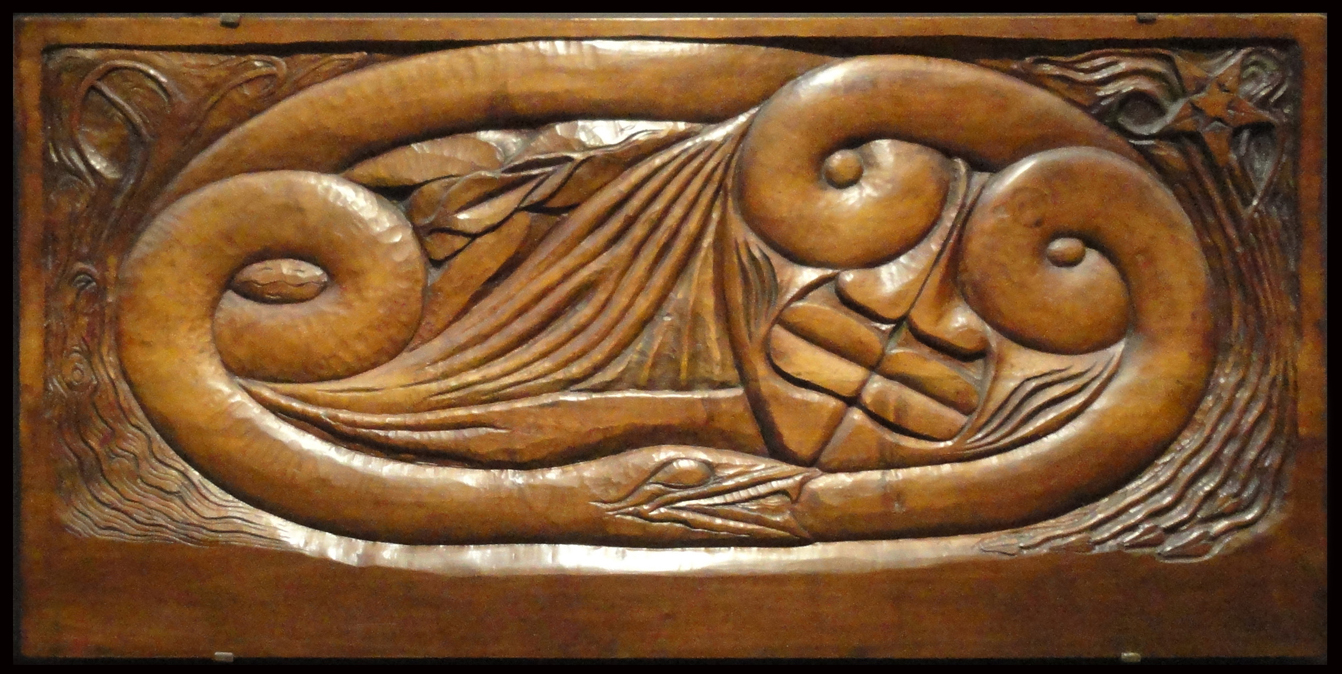
Georges Lacombe, L'Existence, 1894–1896

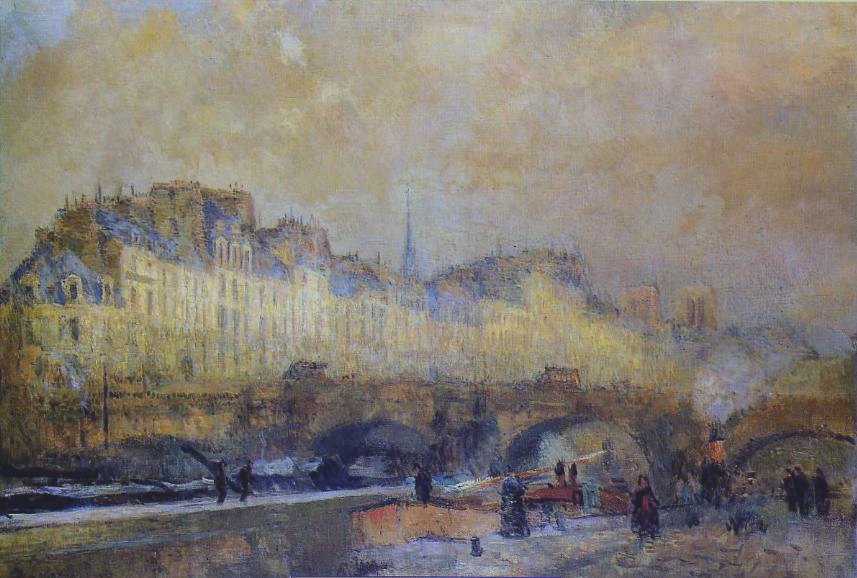
Albert Lebourg, Paris, l'écluse de la Monnaie. Soleil d'hiver

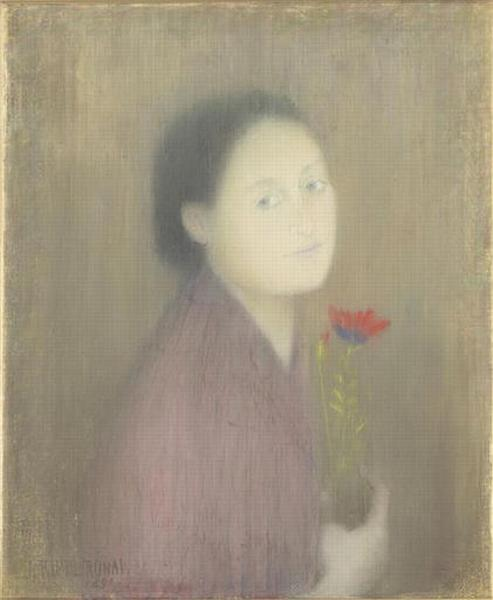
József Rippl-Rónai, Female with Flower, 1891

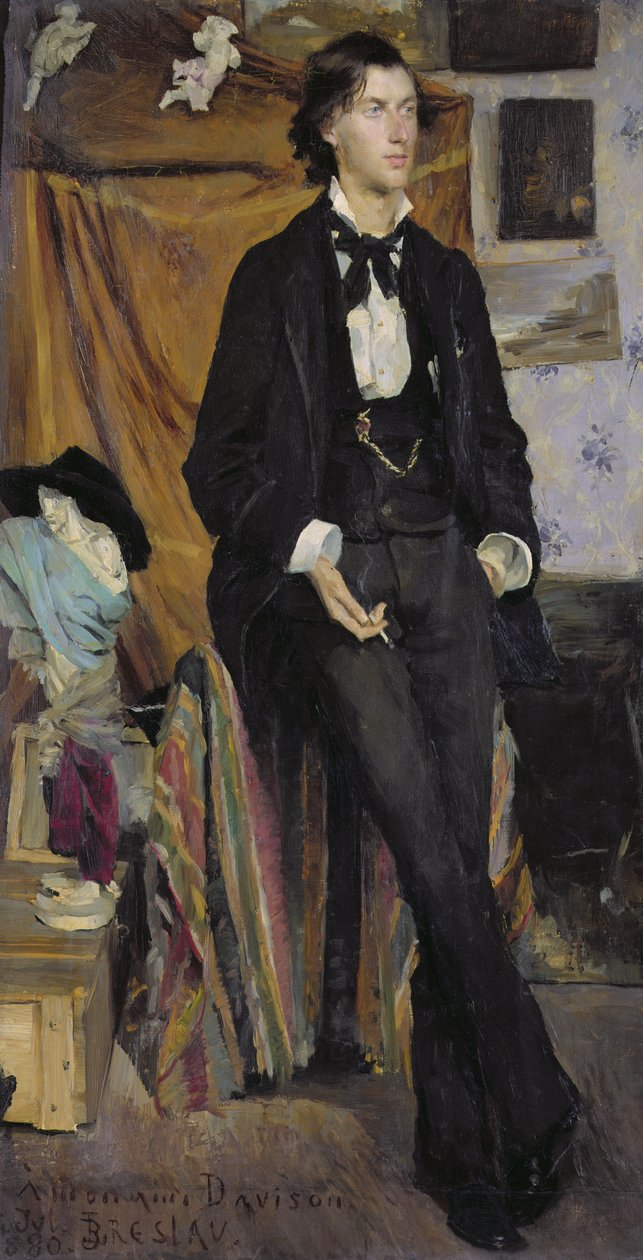
Louise Catherine Breslau, Portrait of Henry Davison, 1880

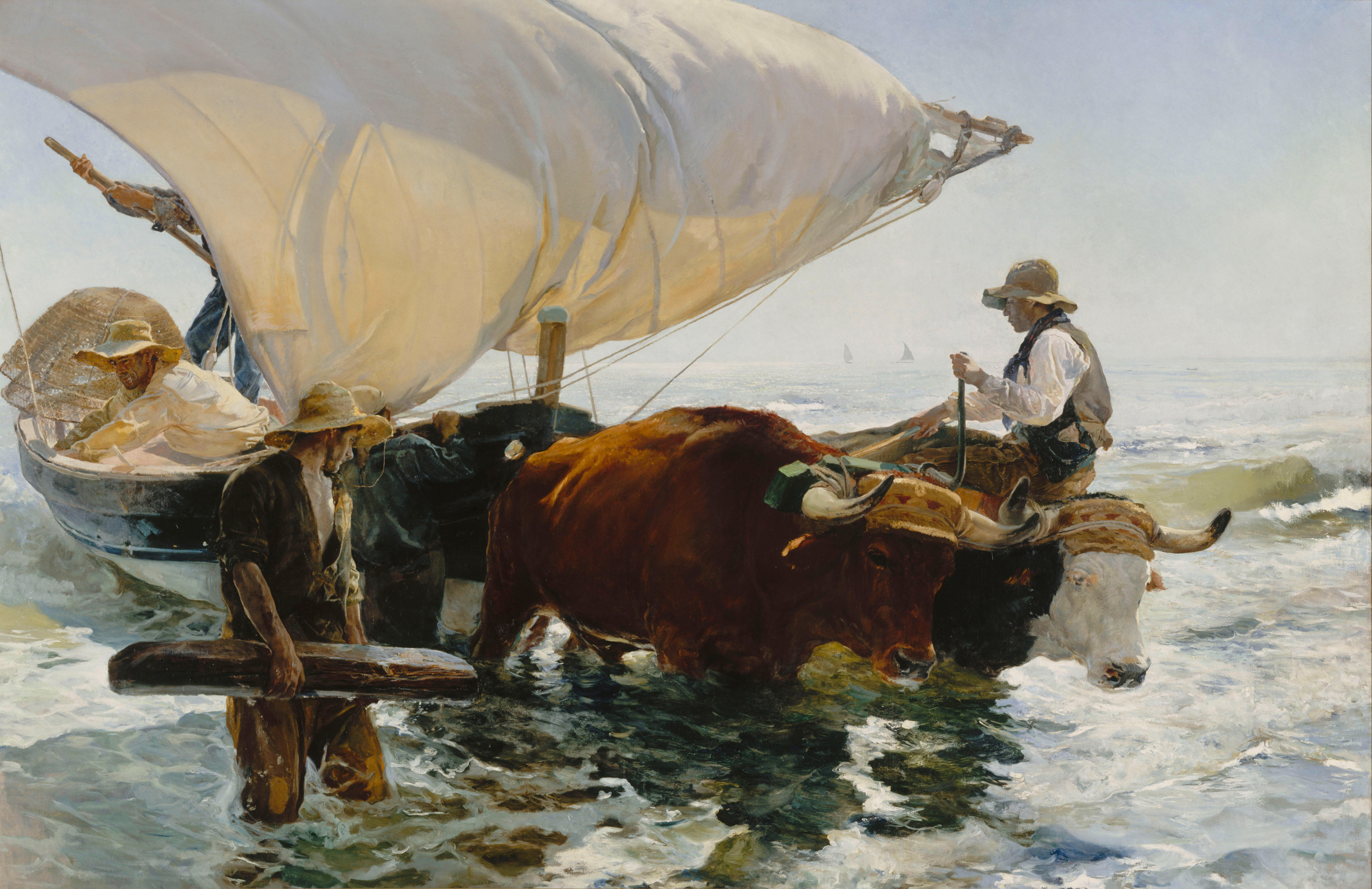
Joaquín Sorolla, La Vuelta de la Pesca, 1894

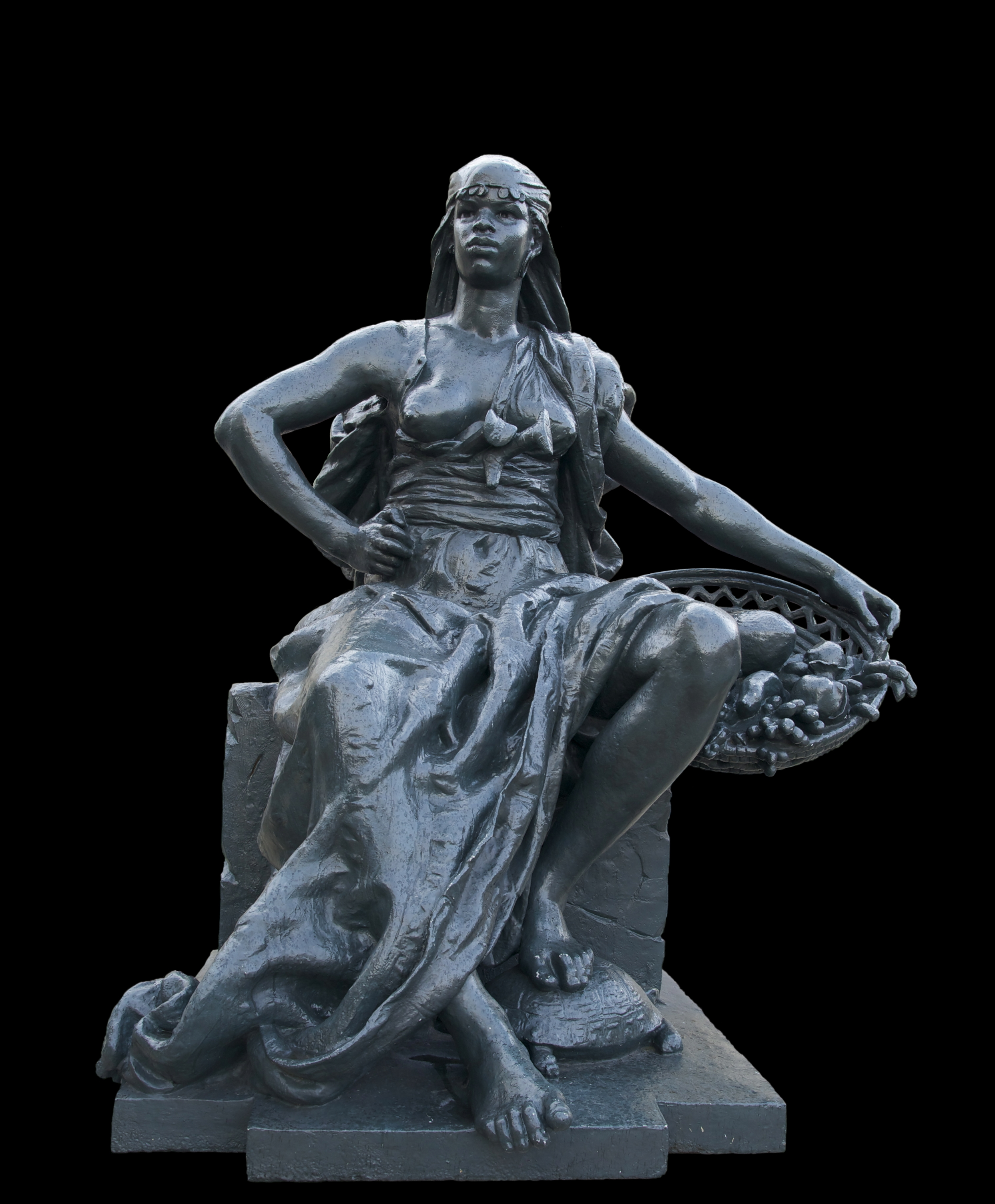
Eugène Delaplanche, Africa, 1878

== Management ==
The Directors have been:

- Françoise Cachin: 1986 – 1994
- Henri Loyrette: 1994 – 2001
- Serge Lemoine: 2001 – 2008
- Guy Cogeval: March 2008 – March 2017
- Laurence des Cars: March 2017 – September 2021
- Christophe Leribault: October 2021 – April 2024
- Sylvain Amic: April 2024 – August 2025
- Annick Lemoine became the new president on 19 March 2026, following the death of Sylvain Amic.

== See also ==
- Musée, a comic book set at the museum
- Paul Dubois (sculptor)
- List of museums in Paris
- List of largest art museums
- List of most-visited art museums
- List of tourist attractions in Paris
