= The Wounded Man (painting) =

Painting by Gustave Courbet

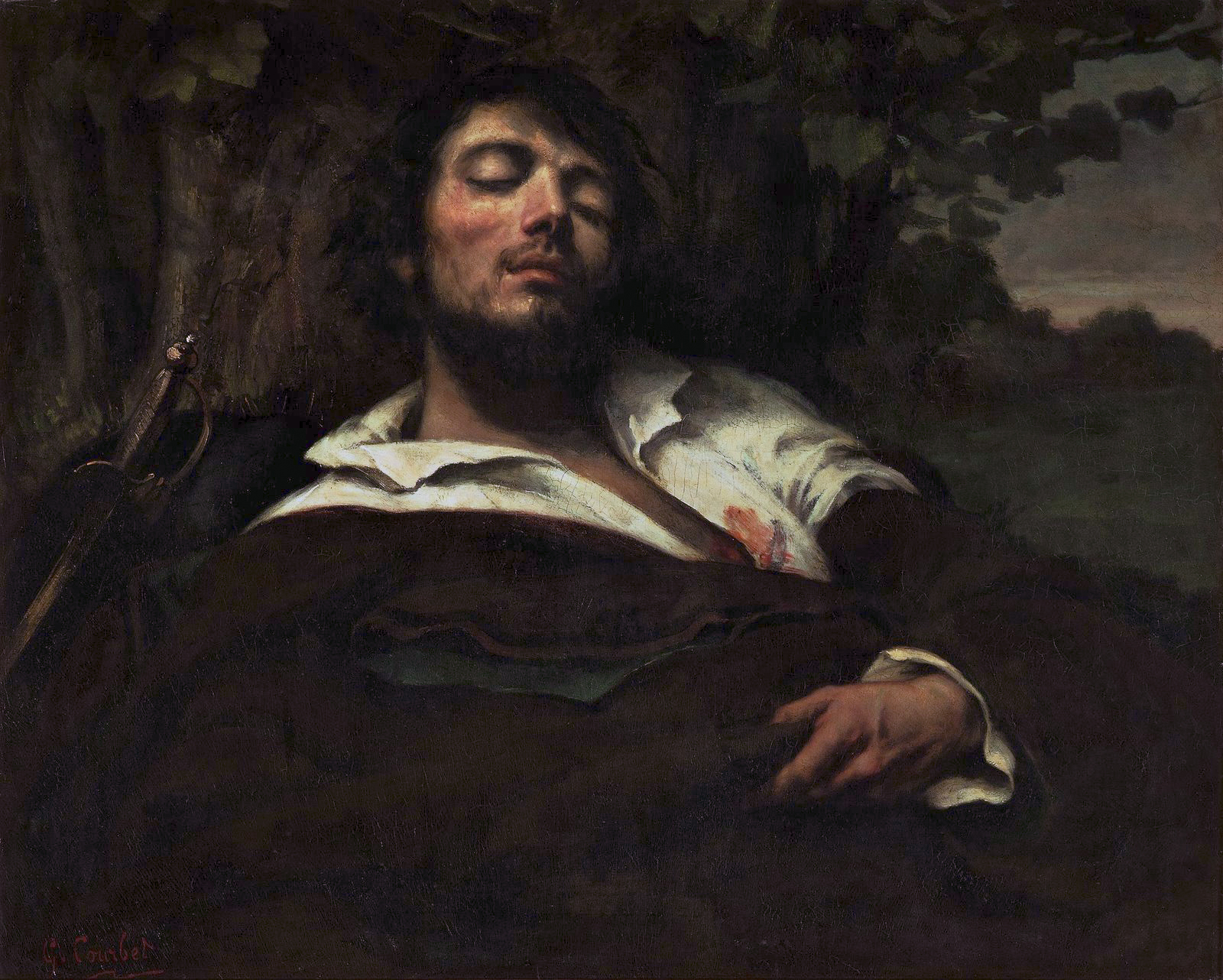
- Artist: Gustave Courbet
- Year: c. 1844-1854
- Medium: Oil on canvas
- Dimensions: 81.5 cm × 97.5 cm (32.1 in × 38.4 in)
- Location: Musée d'Orsay, Paris

The Wounded Man (French: L'Homme blessé) is an oil-on-canvas self-portrait created between 1844 and 1854 by the French Realist painter Gustave Courbet. In it, Courbet depicts himself in a romantic theme as a suffering, heroic man. Originally, the composition featured a woman leaning on the artist's shoulder. Sometime before May 1854, Courbet replaced her with a sword, and added a red bloodstain on his shirt. Courbet's decision to depict himself as a wounded man may have arisen from his distress at the dissolution, circa 1851, of his 14-year relationship with Virginie Binet, with whom he had a son.
