= The Lion Hunt (Delacroix) =

1855 painting by Eugène Delacroix

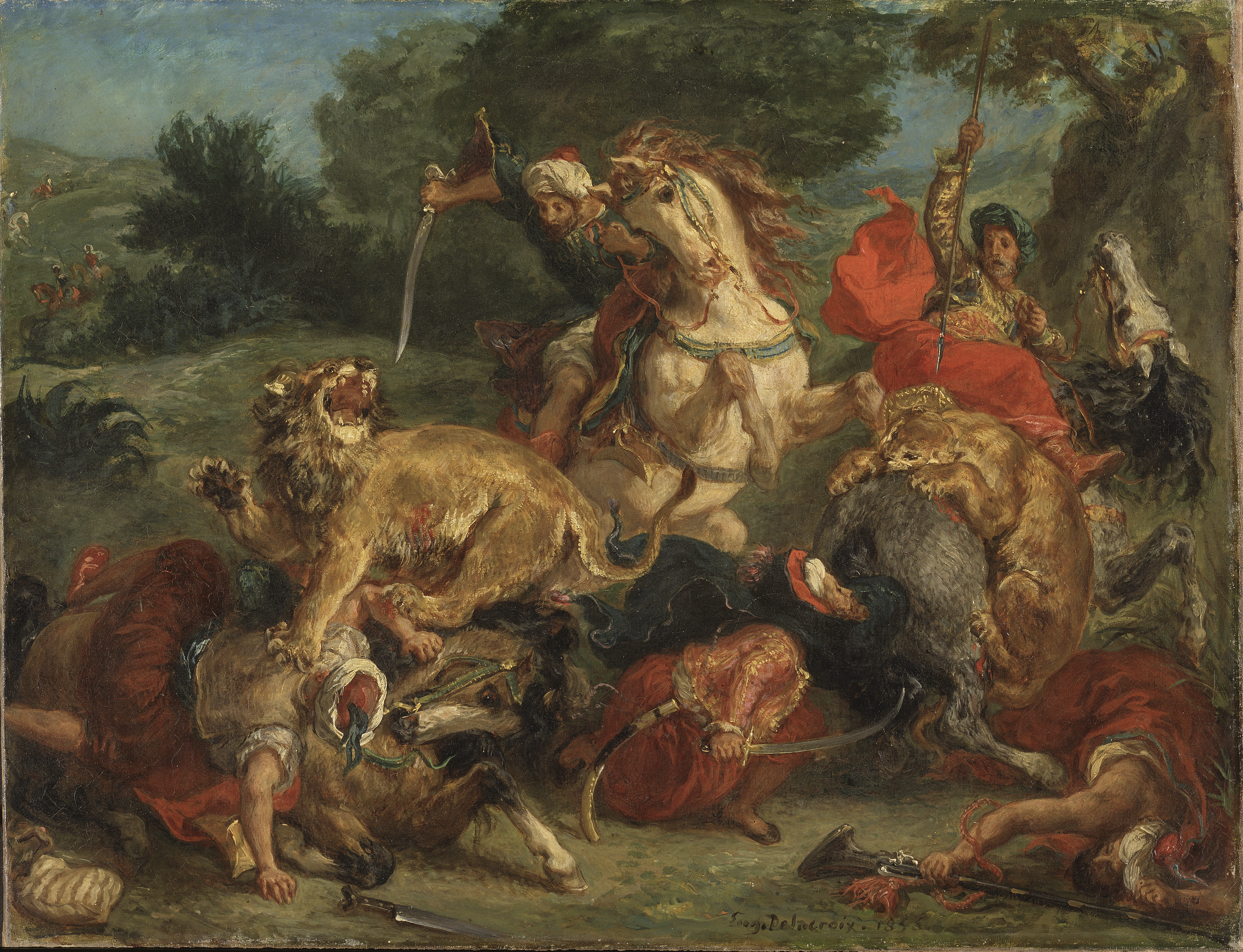
- Artist: Eugène Delacroix
- Year: 1855
- Medium: oil on canvas
- Dimensions: 57 cm × 74 cm (22 in × 29 in)
- Location: Nationalmuseum, Stockholm

The Lion Hunt (French: Chasse aux lions) is a series of oil on canvas paintings produced by the French artist Eugène Delacroix in the mid-1800s.

Delacroix often painted hunting scenes and animals fighting. Like many other artists of the romantic era, he was fascinated by oriental and exotic locales. In 1832 he made a long trip to Morocco that provided lasting inspiration for his work. In large, colourful paintings, lions, tigers, and hunters on horseback fight to the Death. But Delacroix had most likely never seen such scenes, nor even wild animals in their natural habitat (although Barbary lion was not extinct in Morocco until the 1960s). Instead, he used detailed studies of animals in zoos and of the people and material culture of North Africa to create his pictures.

The dramatism so typical of Romanticism is created here by energetic brushstrokes and the contrast of complementary colours - red and green, blue and orange - and bright and dark patches. The Lion Hunt, painted more than twenty years after his expedition to Morocco, was also influenced by the hunt pictures of the seventeenth-century master Peter Paul Rubens, such as The Lion Hunt.

The most monumental version of the series is the Musée des Beaux-Arts de Bordeaux version from 1855 whose top half was severely damaged during a fire in 1870. Delacroix made at least two sketches of the painting, which now are in the collections at Musée d'Orsay and Nationalmuseum respectively. Later he did similar paintings which now are in the Collections of the Museum of Fine Arts in Boston and Art Institute of Chicago.

== Paintings in the series (and similar paintings) ==
Image	Title	Museum	City	Dimensions (cm)	Year
	Arab Horseman attacked by a Lion	Art Institute of Chicago	Chicago	44 × 38	1849–1850
	Lion Hunt in Morocco	Hermitage Museum	Saint Petersburg	74 × 92	1854
	The Lion Hunt	Musée d'Orsay	Paris	86 × 115	1854
	The Lion Hunt	Nationalmuseum	Stockholm	57 x 74	1855
	The Lion Hunt	Musée des Beaux-Arts	Bordeaux	181 × 247	1855
	The Lion Hunt	Museum of Fine Arts	Boston	92 x 117.5	1858
	Lion Hunt	Art Institute of Chicago	Chicago	76.5 × 98.5	1860–1861
