= Bazille's Studio =

Painting by Frédéric Bazille

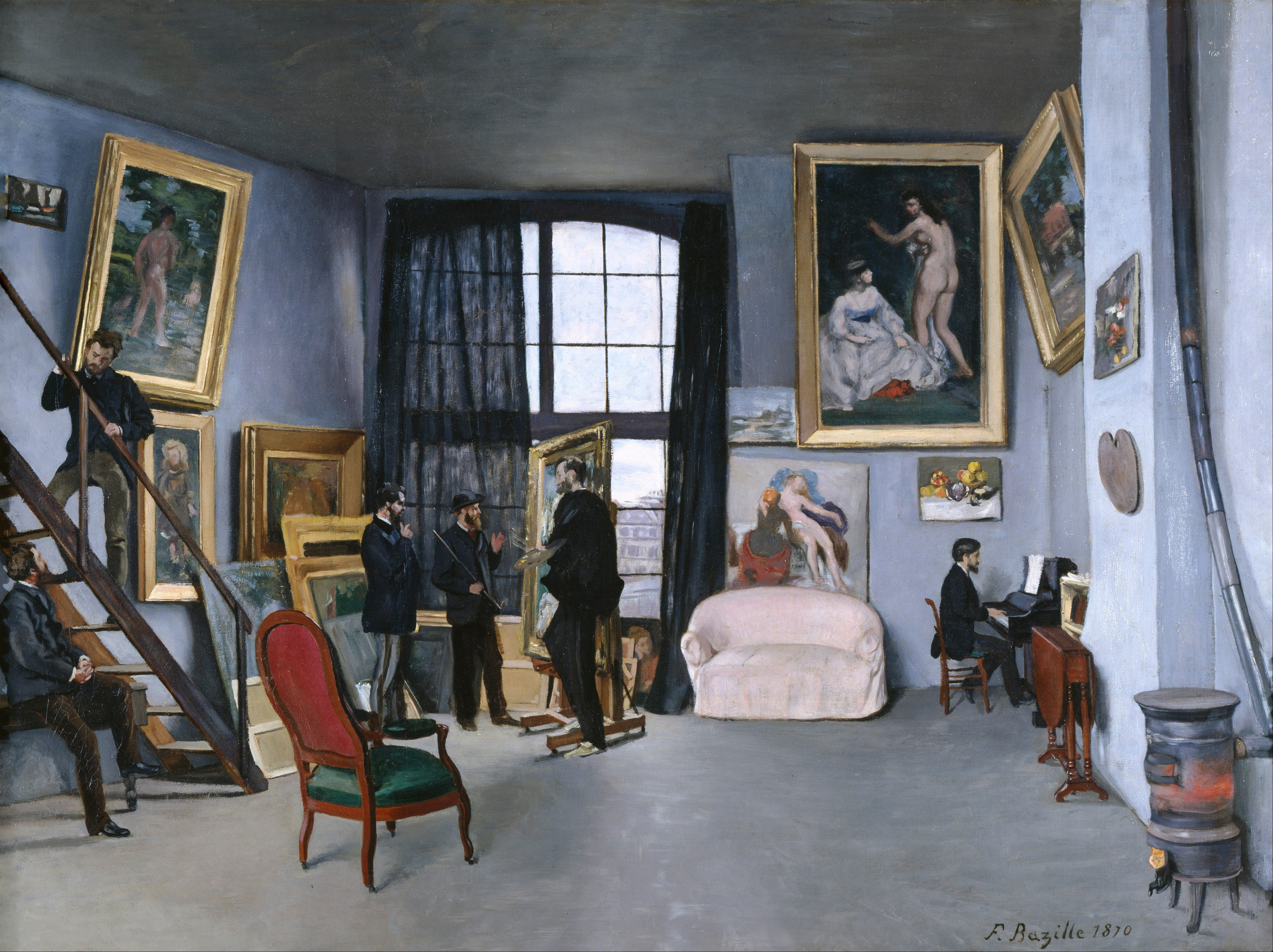
- Artist: Frédéric Bazille
- Year: 1870
- Medium: oil on canvas
- Dimensions: 48 cm × 65 cm (19 in × 26 in)
- Location: Musée d'Orsay; Paris

Bazille's Studio (L'atelier de Bazille) is an oil-on-canvas painting created in 1870 by the French Impressionist Frédéric Bazille (with contributions by Édouard Manet). The painting is also known as L'Atelier de la rue Condamine, The Studio, and The Studio on the Rue La Condamine. It has been in the collection of the Musée d'Orsay in Paris since 1986. It shows the artist himself surrounded by his friends and paintings in his studio, capturing the artistic and social conditions of Paris in 1870.

== Description ==
Bazille shared the studio on the rue de la Condamine, in the Batignolles neighborhood of northern Paris, with Pierre-Auguste Renoir from January 1868 to May 1870. Bazille is at the center of the composition, holding a palette, next to a framed painting on the easel. Bazille indicated in a letter that Manet in fact painted his figure in this work. Manet, with his reddish beard and hat, is standing in front of Bazille. On the right, Edmond Maître, a friend of Bazille, is seated in front of the piano under Monet's still life. Art historians differ in their identification of three remaining figures. Claude Monet, Pierre-Auguste Renoir, Alfred Sisley, Émile Zola and Zacharie Astruc have all been named as possibilities. Dianne Pitman suggests that Renoir and Monet are the ones near the stairs and Astruc is standing beside Manet. Harmon Siegel places Monet beside Manet, with Sisley sitting by the stairs at left and Renoir above him. Others have proposed that Monet is next to Manet, Renoir is seated, and Zola is on the stairs.

The painting placed on the easel has been identified as Bazille's View of the Village. The surrounding paintings include an unfinished version of La Toilette (Montpelier, Musée Favre) above the sofa, Fisherman with a Net (Zürich, Fondation Rau) on the high left, and the Fortune-Teller beneath the window. The Terrace at Méric (Ohio, Cincinnati Art Museum) on the top of the right wall and small Western Ramparts of Aigues-Mortes (Washington D.C, National Gallery of Art Museum) next to the window have also been identified. On the top right of the window, there is Landscape with Two Figures (Paysage avec deux figures) by Renoir of which only the lower left half survives (Woman with Bird). Monet's small still-life painting, Les Fruits is hanging above Maître. The paintings on the wall had all been rejected at some point by the Salon; Bazille expresses his support for them by placing them on view here. By showing work in progress, Bazille also reveals the evolution of his work. Additionally, the window shows a view of Zola's apartment at 14 Rue la Condamine, alluding to the writer's support for these artists' work.

== X-radiograph ==
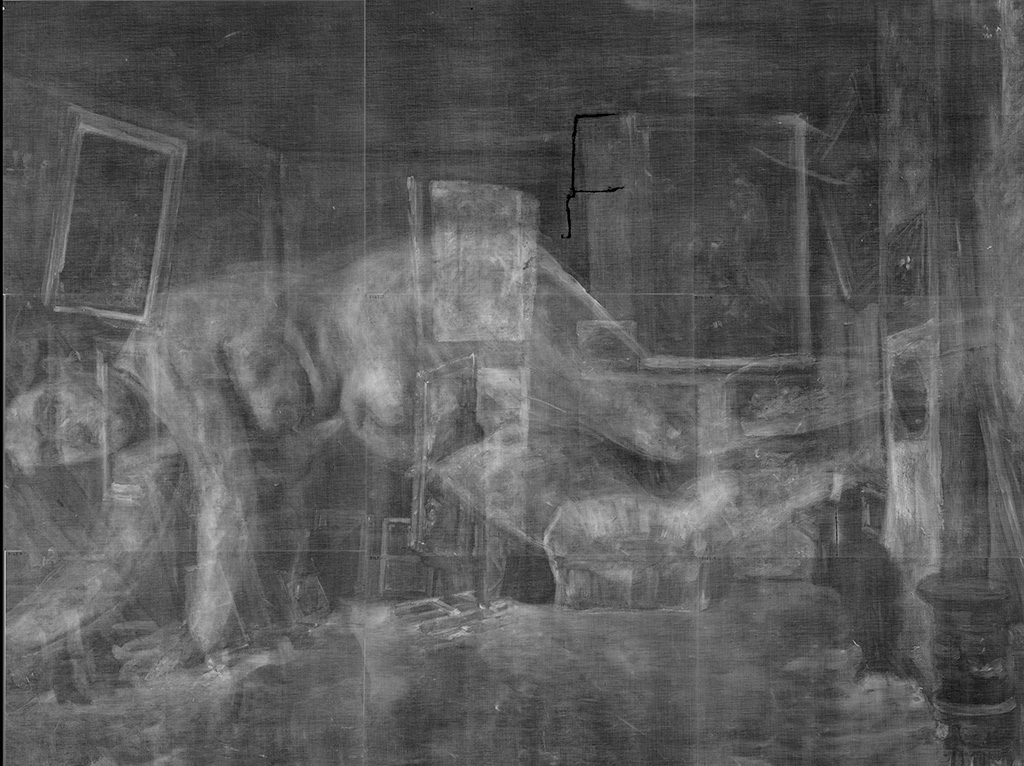
X-radiograph of Bazille's Studio or The Studio on the Rue La Condamine. © C2RMF/Bruno Mottin

The Centre for Research and Restoration of the Museums of France (C2RMF), the National Gallery of Art in Washington and other American museums examined Bazille's paintings through X-radiographs. They revealed hidden compositions beneath Bazille's paintings. In Bazille's Studio, a painting similar to Pierre Auguste Renoir's Diana the Huntress was revealed underneath the surface. Since Bazille shared his studio with Renoir, scholars speculate that Bazille used Renoir's work as a model to practice from and study.

== Interpretation ==
Before late 20th, Bazille was regarded as an artist of secondary importance relative to the Impressionist painters he supported and befriended, such as Monet or Renoir. However, an exhibition of his work at the Musée d'Orsay in 1987 granted Bazille a "modest but secure position among painters."

=== Bazille and his fellow artists ===
Fantin-Latour's A Studio at Les Batignolles likely inspired Bazille's Studio. Both paintings show artists of the Batignolles group gathered in the studio.

Bazille's Studio is a self-portrait of Bazille himself, but also a group portrait of his fellow artists. They are all spread out in the studio, showing their usual attitude or favorite occupations.

=== Bazille and his studio ===
Setting up the studio and being in the studio were fundamental in forming Bazille's identity as an artist. Bazille wrote a letter to his parents in 1862 addressing his passion about producing art in his own studio. Bazille moved his studio several times as his artistic circle changed and grew.

There are several paintings by Bazille that take place in his own studio, including Studio on Rue Furstenberg (1865) and Studio of The Rue Visconti (1867). Unlike his earlier paintings, Bazille's Studio shows the studio filled with artists and Bazille's paintings. The paintings within the studio were mostly done by Bazille himself. Many of the figures look at the works of Bazille, showing appreciation.

== See also ==
- List of paintings by Frédéric Bazille
- Lise Tréhot
