= A Studio at Les Batignolles =

Painting by Henri Fantin-Latour

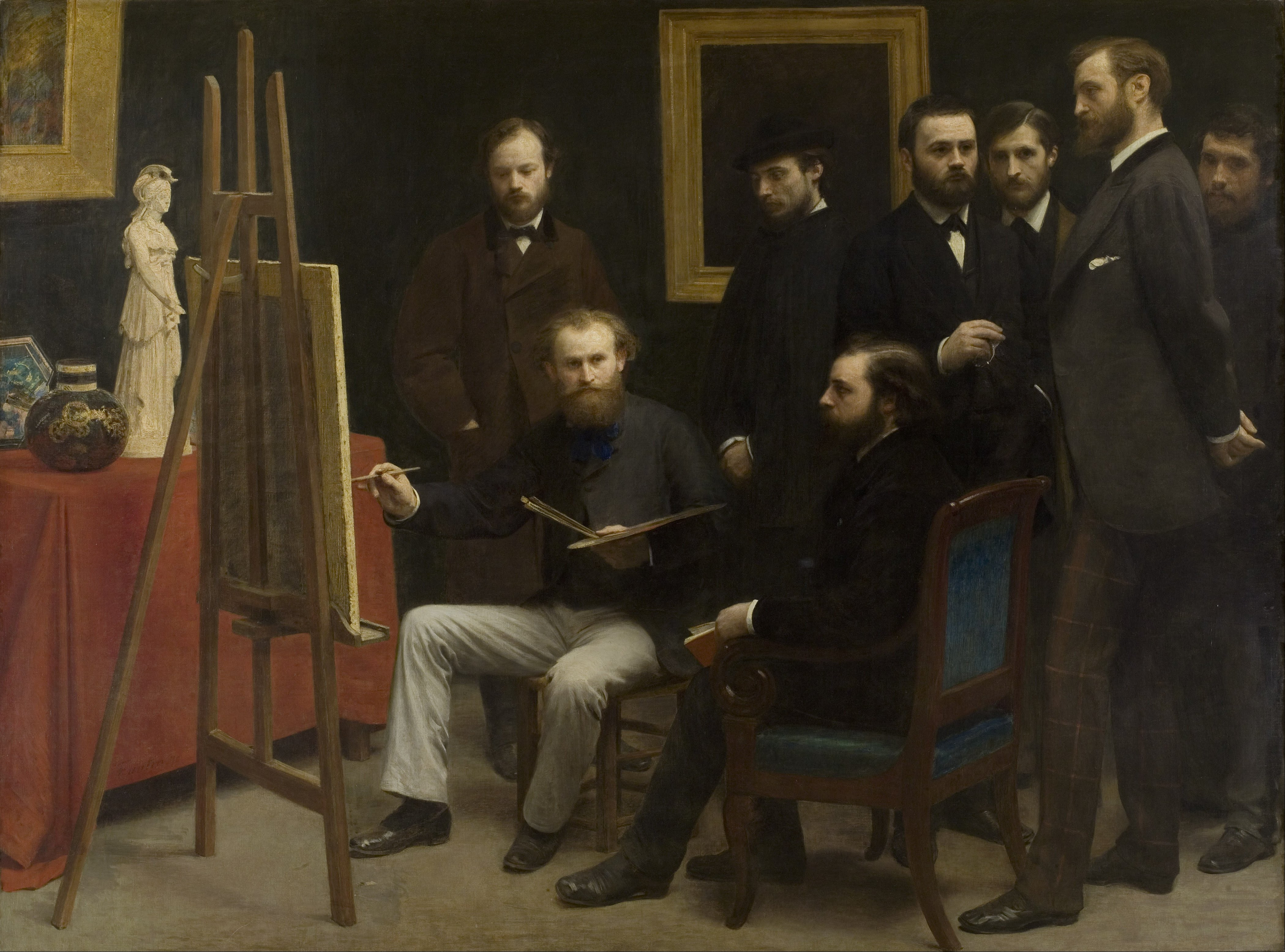
- Artist: Henri Fantin-Latour
- Year: 1870
- Medium: oil on canvas
- Dimensions: 204 cm × 273.5 cm (80 in × 107.7 in)
- Location: Musée d'Orsay, Paris

A Studio at Les Batignolles (French: Un Atelier aux Batignolles) is an oil-on-canvas painting by French Impressionist painter and lithographer Henri Fantin-Latour, created in 1870. It depicts the Batignolles Group at the studio of Édouard Manet in the Batignolles Quarter. The painting was exhibited at the Salon in Paris in 1870.

A Studio at Les Batignolles is the companion piece to a work created six years earlier by Fantin-Latour, Homage to Delacroix, which was done as a tribute to the Romantic painter who had died a year earlier. The two paintings are meant to represent friendship and partisanship among the painters. In contrast to the earlier work, the leading figure in A Studio is Édouard Manet.

The work was acquired by the Musée d'Orsay in 1986, and it remains there today.

== Background ==
=== The Batignolles Group ===
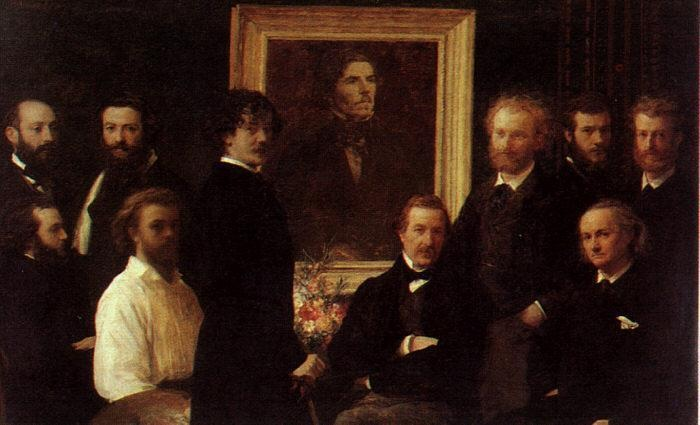
Henri Fantin-Latour. Homage to Delacroix, 1864. Oil on canvas. Musée d'Orsay, Paris.

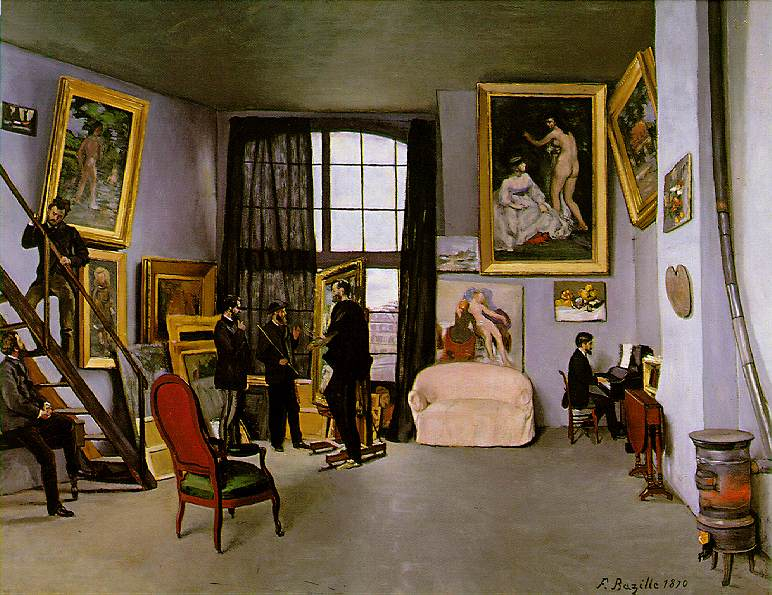
Frédéric Bazille, The Studio in the Rue de la Condamine, 1870. Musée d'Orsay, Paris.

The Batignolles Quarter was a district of Paris that served as the center for artistic activity where several artists located their studios. The Batignolles Group, also referred to as the "École des Batignolles" by critic Edmond Duranty in his 1869 review of the Salon, consisted of artists who gathered with Manet at the famed Café Guerbois, north of the Place de Clichy in the neighborhood. Their friendship was based on mutual material assistance and shared work, and Fantin-Latour's picture is renowned as a representation of artistic camaraderie and community. Fantin-Latour was fully aware that these men were not a single "school," but rather a constantly changing web of loose artistic ties and allegiances. Another painting created that same year by Bazille, Bazille's Studio, portrays the same group gathered in the artist's studio; both paintings stand as the visual manifestos of the group.

=== Fantin-Latour ===
Henri Fantin-Latour. 1836-1904. Self Portrait, 1859, Lyon. Musée des Beaux Arts

Fantin-Latour befriended several members of the Batignolles Group throughout his life. Some, he met while studying, such as Manet at the Louvre in 1857, while others he met through mutual friends. He became a pupil of Courbet in 1861, and in 1862 he became acquainted with Renoir, Monet, and Bazille at the studio of Charles Gleyre. His relationship with the Impressionists was intimate, even exhibiting alongside them at the Salon des Refusés in 1863. However, this was the only time he exhibited with the group; he declined to participate in the First Impressionist Exhibition in Nadar's Studio in 1874, though he remained close to the artists.

== Description ==
The painting shows Édouard Manet capturing the likeness of Zacharie Astruc, a well-known artist, critic, and close friend of Manet’s who defended him during the scandal surrounding his work Olympia. Standing behind the two men are German artist Otto Scholderer, Pierre-Auguste Renoir, writer Émile Zola (the bearded figure pictured with his eyeglasses in his hand), Edmond Maître (patron of the artists), Frédéric Bazille, and Claude Monet, who is somewhat hidden behind the other figures. Fantin-Latour carefully selected key figures from Manet’s circle at Café Guerbois, especially those whom he considered to be notably influential in French art. The painting suggests that they are exchanging observations and convictions regarding artistic matters, further emphasizing the bonds between the artists.

The composition of the work reveals much of Fantin-Latour's intent; Manet's central position in the room, and the deferential position of the other figures relative to him, signals that Manet played a key role in the École des Batignolles. This intention is further expressed in the intensity with which Renoir, whose head is encased by an empty frame, gazes toward Manet, whose face is strongly illuminated. The rest of the visitors are situated from the center to the right of the painting. Zola is positioned and turned away from Manet, assuming the role of his interpreter and mediator. Maître, Renoir, and Scholderer represent the interconnectedness between the artists. Monet's position on the far right highlights the fragile cohesion between schools of art shared by the painters present.

On the left side of the painting, Fantin-Latour depicts a statuette of Athena, a Japanese-style ceramic pot, and a multicolor lacquered tray placed orderly on a rich, red cloth. A fragment of a portrait is visible above them. These items demonstrate the aesthetic preferences of Fantin-Latour and those close to him. The statuette is representative of admiration and respect for antique tradition, and although the pot's design appears to be Japanese, it was actually created by French artist Laurent Bouvier, a former member of the Café Guerbois group and a friend of both Fantin-Latour and Manet. Nevertheless, the lacquered tray does seem to be a Japoniste object, evocative of the Impressionists' infatuation with Japanese art.

The composition, style of brushstroke, and dark tones chosen by Fantin-Latour give this painting characteristics of traditional Flemish portraits and seventeenth-century French realism, diverging from the movement that this group would later embody, Impressionism.

== Composition and creation ==
Fantin-Latour achieved his first major public success with this work, which is also notable for being his first piece to have a title highlighting the space depicted rather than a specific figure or action. Additionally, it is his first group portrait in which he does not portray himself.

Before the actual creation of the painting, Fantin-Latour spent over five years producing myriad preliminary sketches and studies in an array of media, including black charcoal, graphite on paper, and oil. In these sketches, Fantin-Latour explored several different angles, subjects, accessories, gestures, intentions, and moods. Some sketches, such as one from October 29, 1865, illustrate a lively, rowdy scenario where the studio's collective spirit is caught at a "fever pitch". A more relaxed, informal, and personal concept of studio sociability is developed in later drawings. The final painting, however, shows a somber, solemn group that is reminiscent of Dutch seventeenth-century group portraits, which is an attribute that he likely inherited from his time in apprenticeship under Courbet. The impact of his devotion toward Dutch Masters can be seen in several of his works, including “the quiet calm of his compositions, in his love for interior scenes of homely simplicity, and especially in his acute power of observation and his ability to render that power with overwhelming clarity”.

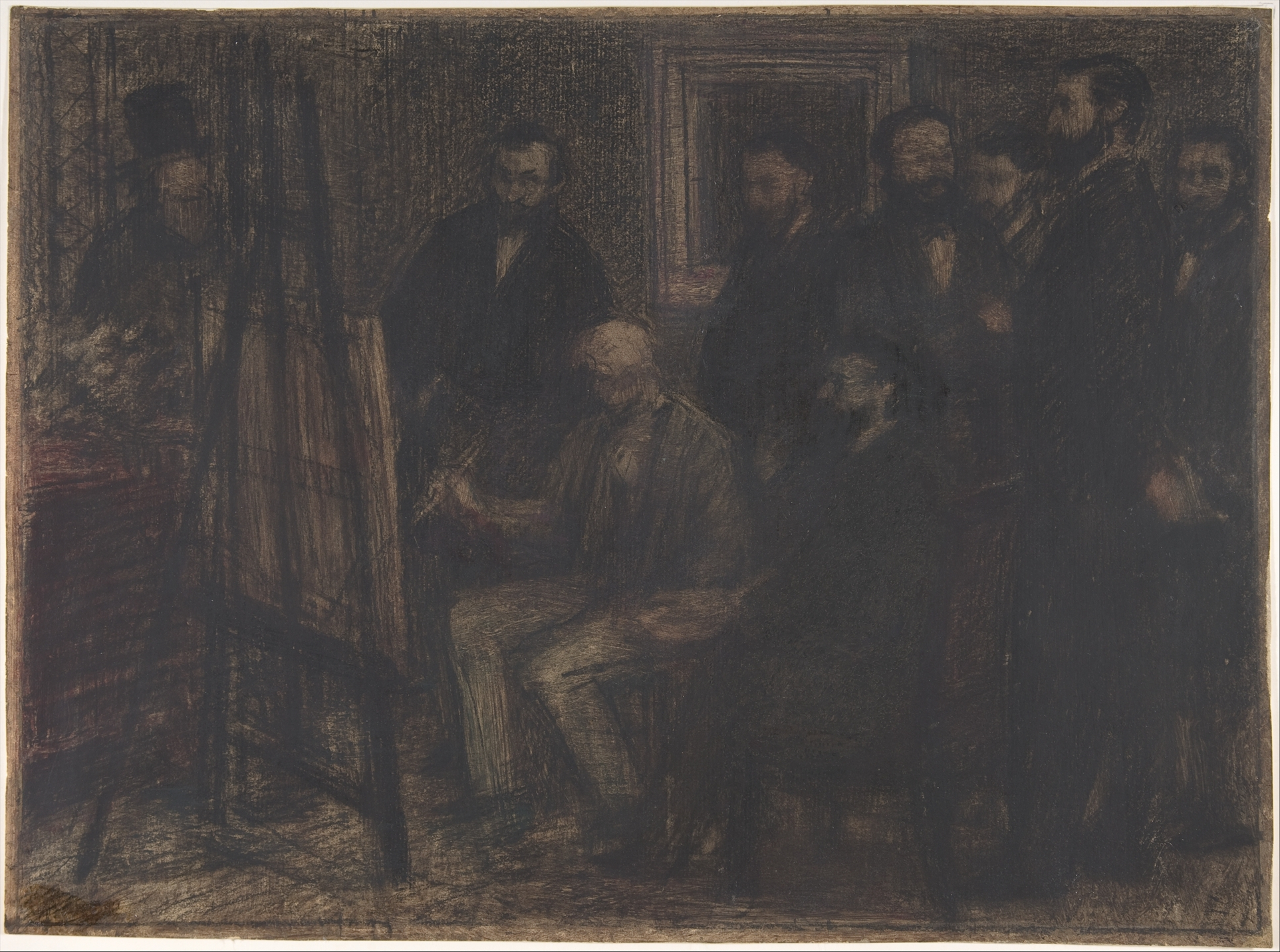
Preparatory charcoal study for A Studio at les Batignolles

The final work reveals how his conception of the project evolved. The changes also correspond to shifts in the Parisian art world of 1869-70. The area of the work that received the majority of the changes between the sketches and the final piece was the left section, directly to the left of Manet's easel. In a charcoal preparatory study, a figure with a top hat enters the scene from the left, presumably as a latecomer. Many assume this figure was Edgard Degas, though it is unclear. In a later oil sketch, the anonymous figure is joined by a mysterious woman who appears to be sketching in a notebook. However, both subjects were ultimately discarded and excluded from the ultimate piece and replaced by a statuette of Athena, a Japanese-style stoneware vase, and a decorative tray.
