= Batignolles group =

Group of late 19th century painters

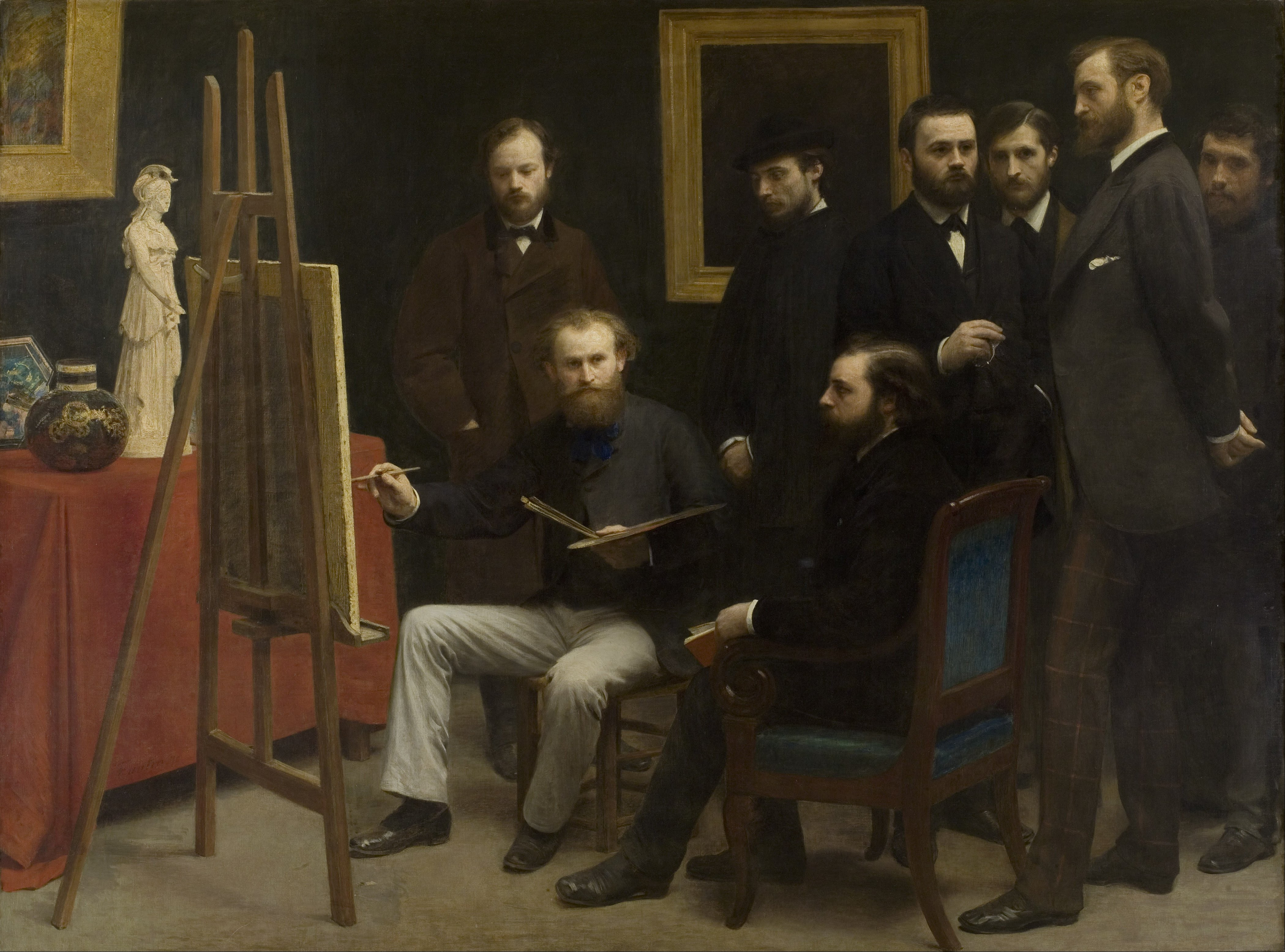
A Studio at Les Batignolles (1870), Henri Fantin-Latour

The Batignolles group (Le groupe des Batignolles) was a group of young avant-garde painters from the end of the 19th century who gathered around Édouard Manet. The group bears its name in reference to the Batignolles district, where the artists used to meet between 1869 and 1875. Many of the artists in the group later became known for the Impressionism movement.

== Background ==
Édouard Manet (1832–1883) lived on Boulevard des Batignolles, and maintained his workshop on Rue Guyot (now renamed Rue Médéric). He achieved some success at the Salon in 1861 with The Spanish Singer (1860), which received accolades from writer Charles Baudelaire (1821–1867) and journalist and literary critic Théophile Gautier (1811–1872). This enhanced reputation also brought younger artists into Manet's sphere out of admiration and respect, making him the leader of a new avant-garde movement centered around Batignolles.

The studio of academic artist Charles Gleyre (1806–1874) attracts many from what will later become the Batignolles group. Pierre-Auguste Renoir (1841–1919), Alfred Sisley (1839–1899), and Frédéric Bazille (1841–1870) begin studying at Gleyre in 1862, followed by Claude Monet in 1863. They all become friends, but Monet leaves the studio after finding it less conducive to his goals as an artist.

== Cafe Guerbois ==
Around Manet, a group of friends formed to regularly meet in the neighborhood's cafes, in particular at the Café Guerbois (which has now disappeared, but a plaque still marks its location at 11 Avenue de Clichy).

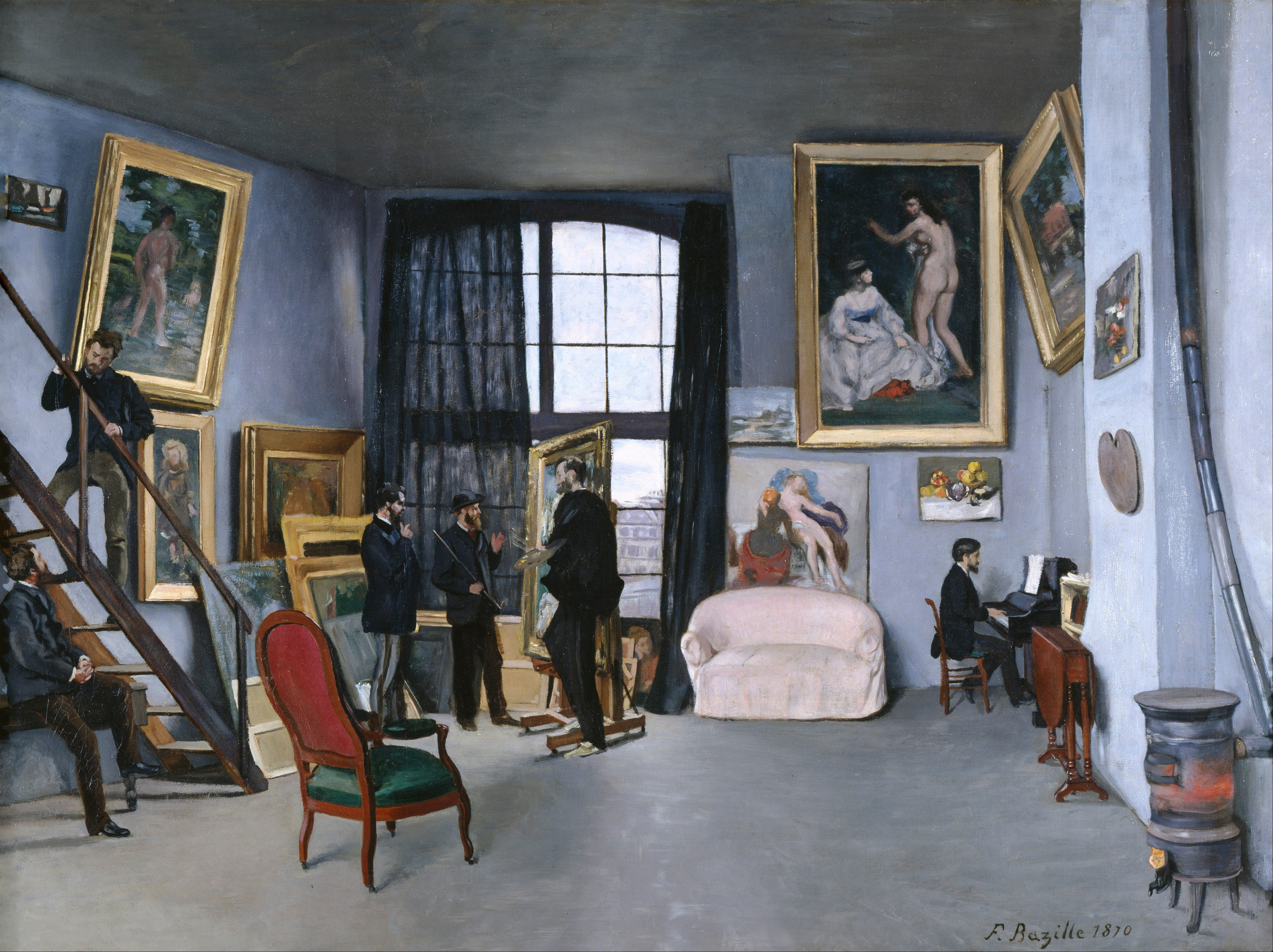
Bazille's Studio (1870) by Frédéric Bazille. The studio was located in the rue de La Condamine, in the Batignolles district. Six members of the group are featured in the painting.

The most frequent attendees at these meetings were Manet himself, Renoir, Sisley and Bazille. From time to time, they were joined by other painters, such as Camille Pissarro and Edgar Degas, the patron and critic Edmond Maître, the writer Émile Zola and the photographer Nadar. Their conversations and discussions contained fruitful exchanges of ideas and theories as to how to overcome the conservative Académie des Beaux-Arts that controlled the annual exhibition at the Salon de Paris.

== Franco-Prussian War ==
After Napoleon III declared war on Prussia in 1870, many members of the group enlisted as soldiers. Cézanne avoided the draft by escaping to L'Estaque, a village in southern France, just west of Marseille. While there, Cézanne began to practice the new techniques he had learned from the Batignolles group, using small brushstrokes and a brighter palette.

Meanwhile, Monet, Sisley, and Pissarro all left France separately for London, England. According to Pissarro, he met up with Monet by accident in London, and they began to work together and study London landscapes: "Monet worked in the parks, while I studied the effects of fog, snow, and springtime." It was also in London where Monet and Pissarro first met and developed a relationship with French art dealer Paul Durand-Ruel, who would later become instrumental to the success of the Impressionists, beginning with large purchases of their work in 1872.

Degas fought in the National Guard and had little time to paint. Bazille died on the battlefield at Beaune-la-Rolande in November at the age of twenty-eight.

== Society of Artists, Painters, Sculptors and Etchers ==
This association became official on December 27, 1873, with a charter signed by Monet, Renoir, Sisley, Pissarro, Degas, and Pierre Prins. Monet published on January 27, 1874, in issue 3 La Chronique des Arts the announcement of the foundation of the "Société anonyme des artistes peintres, sculpteurs et graveurs", and planned to exhibit their art independently.

== First exhibition ==
The first exhibition of the group was held from April 15 through May 15, 1874, at Nadar's former workshop at No. 35, Boulevard des Capucines. One featured painting by Monet, Impression, Sunrise, later led to the name of Impressionists. Another of Monet's paintings, entitled Boulevard des Capucines, dates from this time.

The show did not go well, and many people came to laugh and deride the artists and their work.

== Second exhibition ==
A second exhibition held in 1875 was met with violence by the crowd and the police had to be called. The paintings that did sell were sold for low prices, and many of the artists were reduced to begging for loans to survive.

== Legacy ==
Among the artists of the Batignolles, many later became known as great masters of the Impressionist movement.

The group was immortalized in an 1870 painting by Henri Fantin-Latour, now in the Musée d'Orsay.

== Members ==
Core of nine

- Claude Monet, nucleus
- Pierre-Auguste Renoir, nucleus
- Alfred Sisley, nucleus
- Frédéric Bazille, nucleus
- Camille Pissarro
- Paul Cézanne
- Berthe Morisot, only woman in the core group
- Édouard Manet, intellectual leader
- Edgar Degas

Minor roles

- Félix Bracquemond
- Armand Guillaumin
- Antoine Guillemet
- Henri Fantin-Latour
- Gustave Caillebotte, patron
- Edmond Maître
- Émile Zola, promoted and defended the group
- Pierre Prins
- Mary Cassatt
- Paul Gauguin
- Nadar, hosted the first exhibition of Impressionists in his studio
