= View of the Village =

Painting by Frédéric Bazille

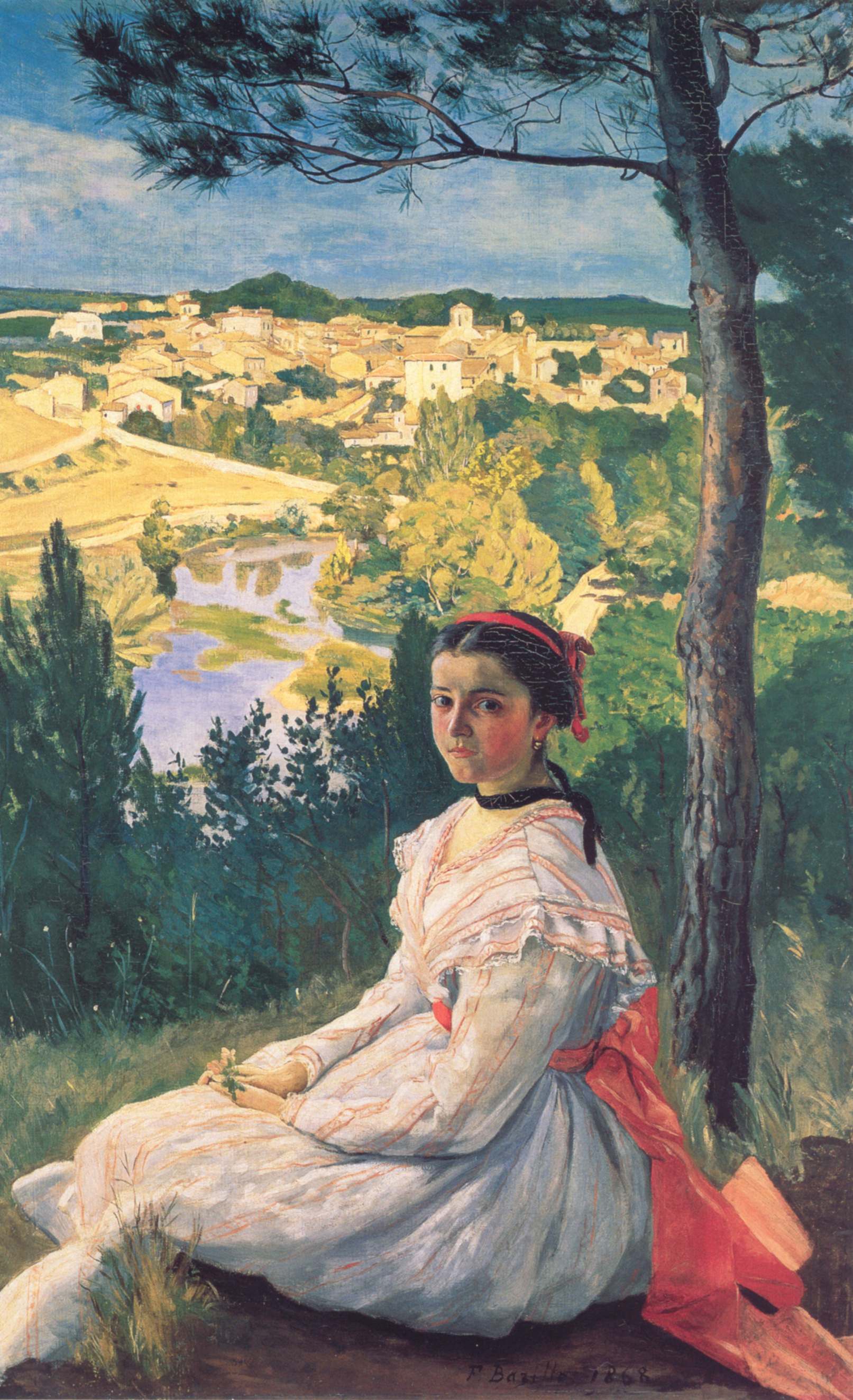
- Artist: Jean-Frédéric Bazille
- Year: 1868
- Medium: oil on canvas
- Dimensions: 130 cm × 89 cm (51 in × 35 in)
- Location: Musee Fabre, Montpellier

View of the Village is an oil-on-canvas painting created in 1868 by the French Impressionist Jean-Frédéric Bazille, now in the Musée Fabre in Montpellier.

It shows a young woman sitting on a stone ledge overlooking the village of Castelnau-le-Lez in the Hérault department of France.

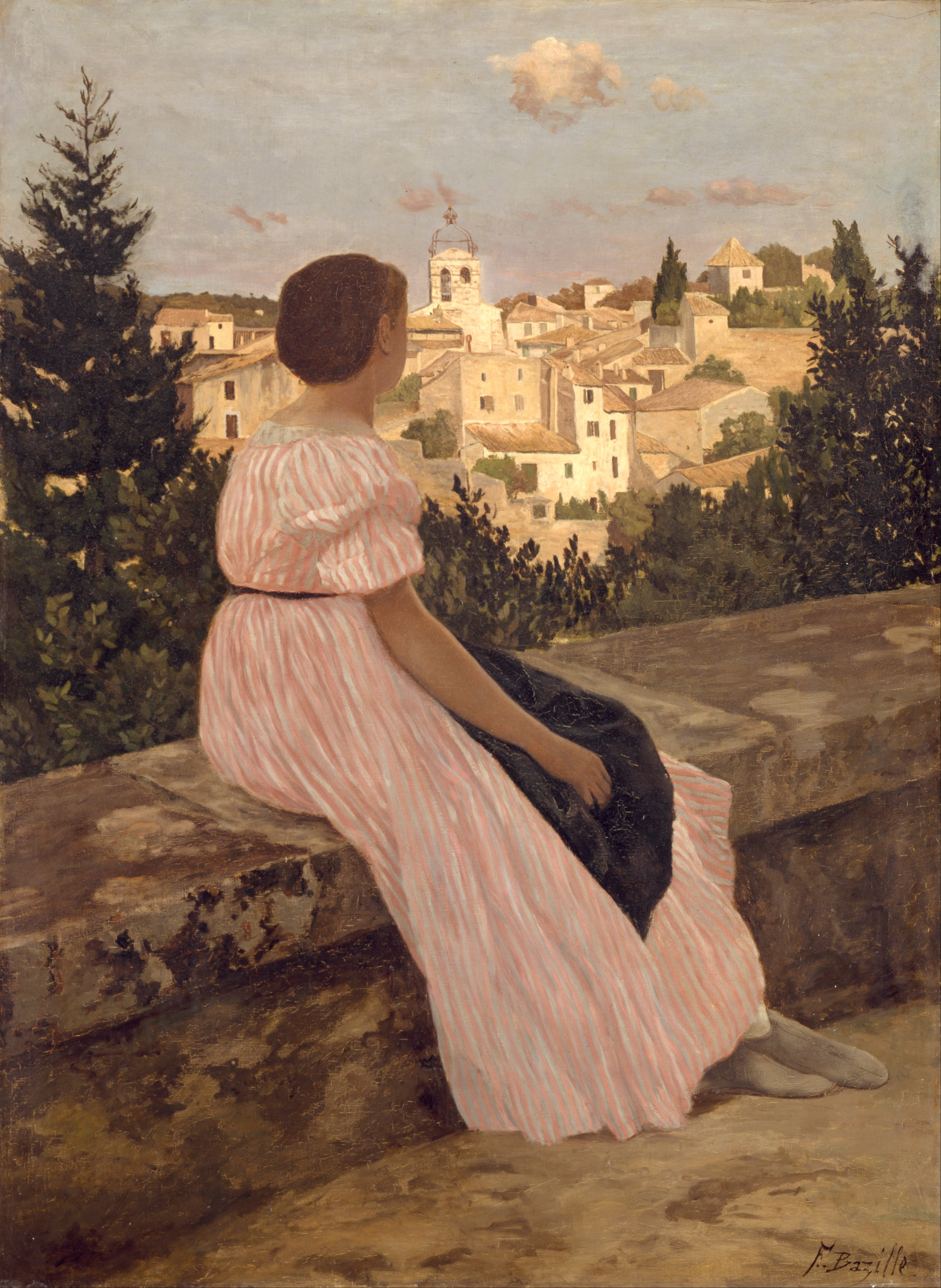
The Pink Dress, 1864

As in his compositionally similar The Pink Dress of 1864 he used the Barbizon school's technique of framing the scene, using dark vegetation to concentrate the viewer's eye on the sunlit village in the distance. In this later work additional interest is provided by the subject looking towards the viewer.

The work was refused by the Salon.

Berthe Morisot "loved the way Bazille had captured the flooding, beneficent feeling of the natural light.... But she loved even more that the painting wasn't primarily a landscape. Its main subject, posing on a hilltop overlooking a Provençal village, was a sweet, fashionably dressed, slightly vulnerable-looking young woman.... Yes, it looked a little naïve, a little awkward. But it was incredibly fresh. Better yet, it had a psychological charge—a palpable air of ambivalence and fragility. Berthe wanted to capture a similar quality in her own work when she painted herself with Edma."

== See also ==
- List of paintings by Frédéric Bazille
