= Café Guerbois =

Historical café in Paris, France

Coordinates: 48.8844576°N 2.32677325°E

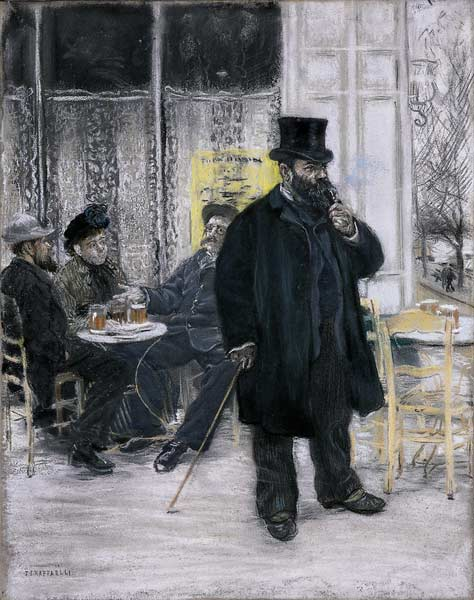
Bohèmes au café. (1886) Jean-François Raffaelli. Pastel on fabric. 55 x 44 cm. Bordeaux: Musée des Beaux-Arts.

Café Guerbois, on Avenue de Clichy in Paris, was the site of late 19th-century discussions and planning amongst artists, writers and art lovers – the bohèmes (bohemians), in contrast to the bourgeois.

Centered on Édouard Manet, the group gathered at the café usually on Sundays and Thursdays.

Émile Zola, Frédéric Bazille, Louis Edmond Duranty, Henri Fantin-Latour, Emmanuel Chabrier, Edgar Degas, Claude Monet, Pierre-Auguste Renoir and Alfred Sisley regularly joined in the discussions. Sometimes Paul Cézanne and Camille Pissarro also joined them. The group is sometimes called the Batignolles Group and many of the members are associated with Impressionism.

Conversations there were often heated. On one evening in February 1870, things became so heated that Manet, insulted by a review that Duranty wrote, wounded Duranty in a duel. The injury was not fatal, and the two remained friends.
