= The Pink Dress =

Painting by Frédéric Bazille

- La robe rose (French)
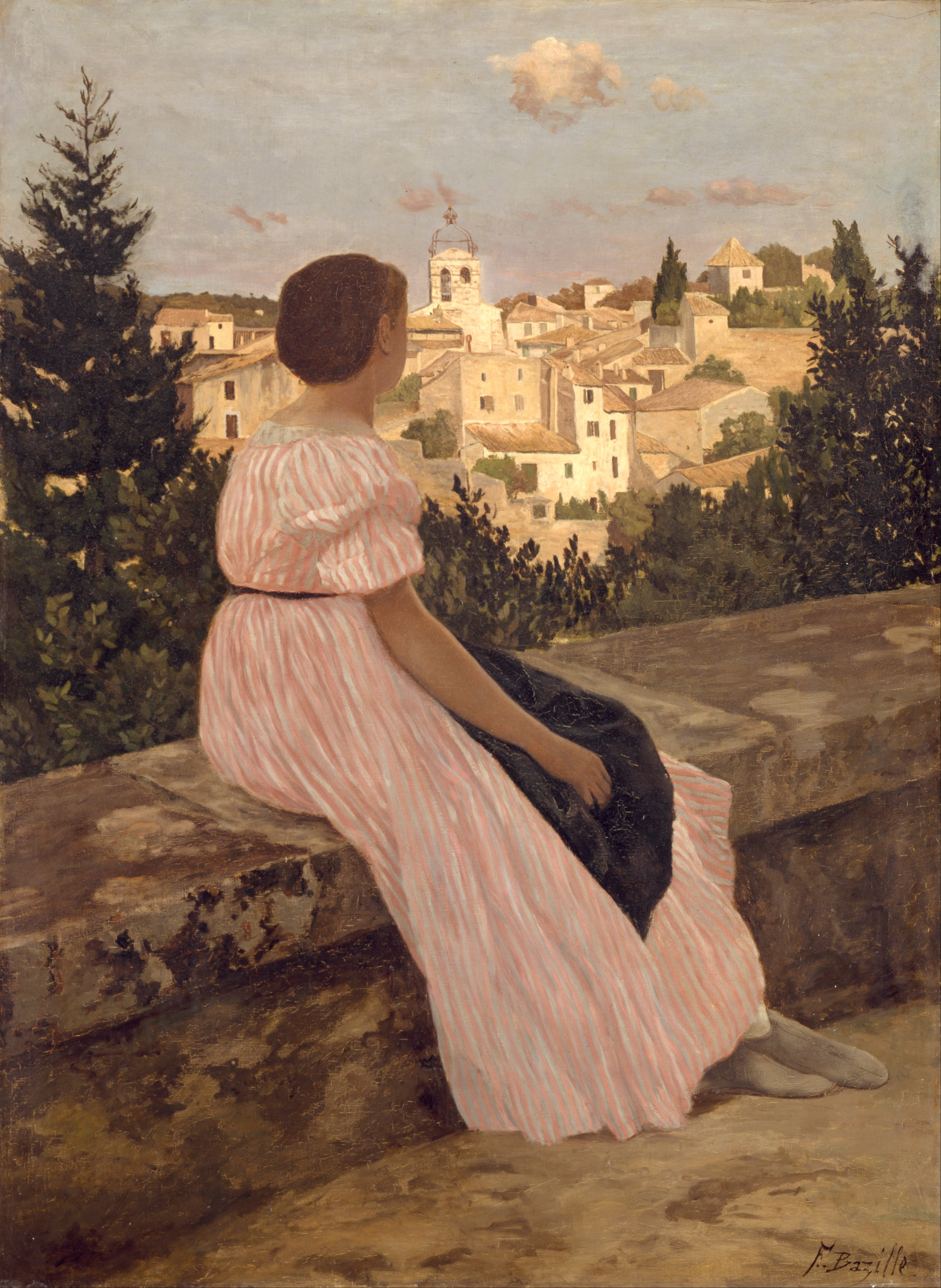
- Artist: Frédéric Bazille
- Year: 1867–68
- Medium: oil on canvas
- Dimensions: 148 cm × 110 cm (58 in × 43 in)
- Location: Musée d'Orsay; Paris

The Pink Dress (La robe rose) is an oil-on-canvas painting by Frédéric Bazille, produced in 1864 when he was aged 23. The work is now in the Musée d'Orsay, in Paris.

== Dimensions and conservation ==
The dimensions of the canvas, kept at the Musée d'Orsay, are a height of 147 cm by a width of 110 cm.

== Overview ==
The painting is an en plein air painting of Bazille's cousin Thérèse des Hours, sitting on the stone ledge around the family property of Le Domaine de Méric in Montpellier, facing the village of Castelnau-le-Lez in the Hérault department of southern France. The Bazille and des Hours families used to spend every summer on the estates which overlooked the village. Thérèse is sitting on the terrace at the far end of the garden, facing away from the viewer. She is wearing a dress with vertical pink and silver stripes, with a black apron. Bazille frames the middle ground with trees, a typical technique of the Barbizon School, using darkness of the trees to direct the viewer's eye to the sun-drenched Midi village in the background.

== See also ==
- List of paintings by Frédéric Bazille
