= Frédéric Bazille =

French painter (1841–1870)

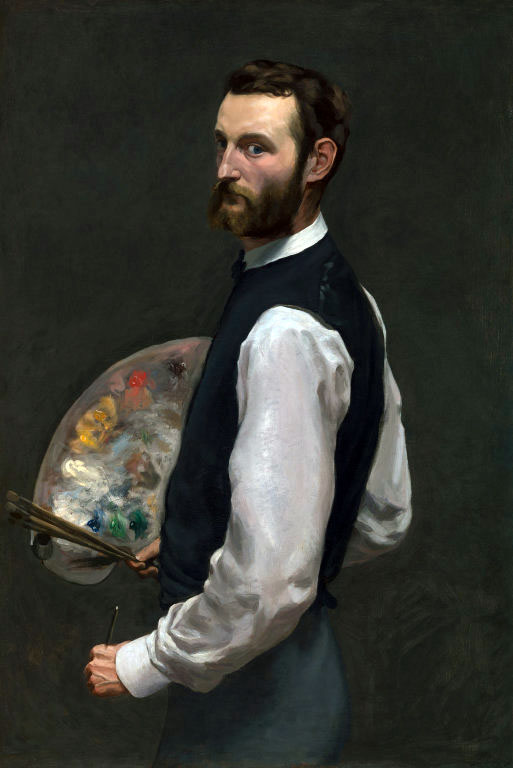
- Self-portrait, 1865–1866, oil on canvas, Art Institute of Chicago
- Born: Jean Frédéric Bazille; 6 December 1841; Montpellier, Hérault, Languedoc-Roussillon, France
- Died: 28 November 1870 (aged 28); Beaune-la-Rolande, France
- Known for: Painting
- Movement: Impressionism

Signature
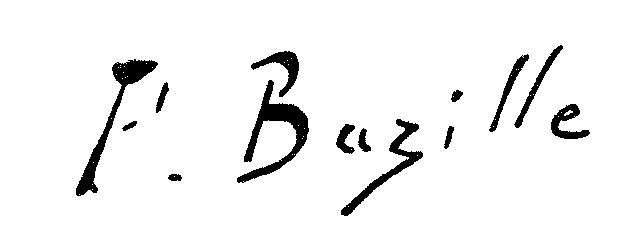

Jean Frédéric Bazille (French pronunciation: [ʒɑ̃ fʁedeʁik bazij]; December 6, 1841 – November 28, 1870) was a French Impressionist painter. Many of Bazille's major works are examples of figure painting in which he placed the subject figure within a landscape painted en plein air.

== Life and work ==
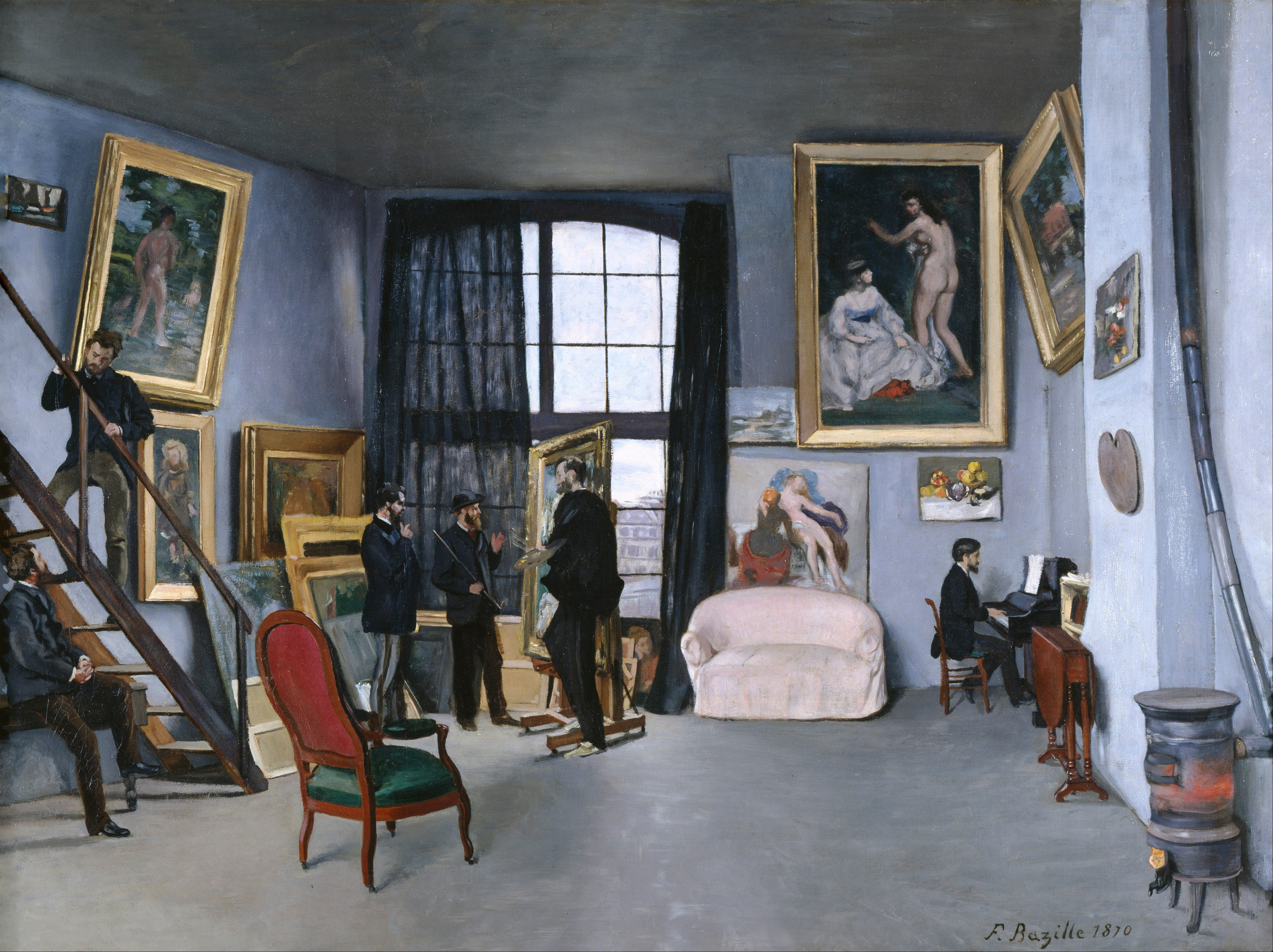
Studio in Rue de La Condamine, 1870, Musée d'Orsay, Paris. Among Bazille's friends portrayed are Pierre-Auguste Renoir sitting, and Édouard Manet next to Bazille, who portrays himself painting.

Frédéric Bazille was born in Montpellier, Hérault, Languedoc-Roussillon, France, into a wealthy wine merchant Protestant family. Bazille grew up in the Le Domaine de Méric, a wine-producing estate in Castelnau-le-Lez, near Montpellier, owned by his family. He became interested in painting after seeing some works of Eugène Delacroix. His family agreed to let him study painting, but only if he also studied medicine.

Bazille began studying medicine in 1859, and moved to Paris in 1862 to continue his studies. There he met Pierre-Auguste Renoir and Alfred Sisley, was drawn to Impressionist painting, and began taking classes in Charles Gleyre's studio. After failing his medical exam in 1864, he began painting full-time. His close friends included Claude Monet, Alfred Sisley and Édouard Manet. Bazille was generous with his wealth and helped support his less fortunate associates by giving them space in his studio and materials to use.

Bazille was just twenty-three years old when he painted several of his best-known works, including The Pink Dress (c. 1864, Musée d'Orsay, Paris). This painting combines a portrait-like depiction of Bazille's cousin, Thérèse des Hours, who is seen from behind—and the sunlit landscape at which she gazes. His best-known painting is Family Reunion, painted 1867–1868 (Musée d'Orsay, Paris).

Frédéric Bazille joined a Zouave regiment in August 1870, a month after the outbreak of the Franco-Prussian War. On November 28th of that year he was with his unit at the Battle of Beaune-la-Rolande when his commanding officer was injured. That required him to take command and lead an assault on the German position. He was hit twice in the failed attack and died on the battlefield at the age of twenty-eight. His father travelled to the battlefield a few days later to take his body back for burial at Montpellier in the Protestant cemetery over a week later.

=== Personal life ===
Bazille never married, claiming it was because of “an early heartbreak with a woman.” He developed intimate friendships with men, such as Edmond Maître, but was also melancholic and claimed to “hav[e] constant migraines while he was painting his nude men.” This and the homoeroticism of his paintings led to modern suggestions that Bazille may have been gay and conflicted about his sexuality.

== In popular culture ==
Scholars have said that Bazille was the model for "the engaging figure of Félicien d'Hautecœur" in Émile Zola's novel Le Réve.

Zola took him as the model for Félicien d'Hautecœur in his fairy tale Le Rêve, and the portrait the novelist paints of his hero seems a true likeness of the images of Bazille that have come down to us: "He resembled a magnificent Jesus, with his curly hair, his light beard, his straight—albeit slightly prominent—nose, and his dark eyes, filled with a haughty gentleness."

== Main works ==
- La robe rose, (1864) – 147 x 110 cm, Musée d'Orsay, Paris
- Studio on Rue Furstenberg, (1865) – 80 x 65 cm, Musée Fabre, Montpellier
- Aigues-Mortes, (1867) – 46 x 55 cm, Musée Fabre, Montpellier
- Self-portrait, (1865) – 109 x72 cm, Art Institute of Chicago
- Family Reunion, (1867) – 152 x 230 cm, Musée d'Orsay, Paris
- Le Pécheur à l'épervier, (1868) – 134 x 83 cm, Fondation Rau pour le tiers-monde, Zürich
- View of the Village, (1868) – 130 x 89 cm, Musée Fabre, Montpellier
- Scène d'été, (1869) – 158 x 158 cm, Cambridge, Harvard University
- La Toilette, (1870) – 132 x 127 cm., Musée Fabre, Montpellier
- L'Atelier de la rue Condamine, (1870) – 98 x 128.5 cm, Musée d'Orsay, Paris
- Paysage au bord du Lez, (1870) – 137.8 x 202.5 cm, The Minneapolis Institute of Arts, Minneapolis

== Gallery ==
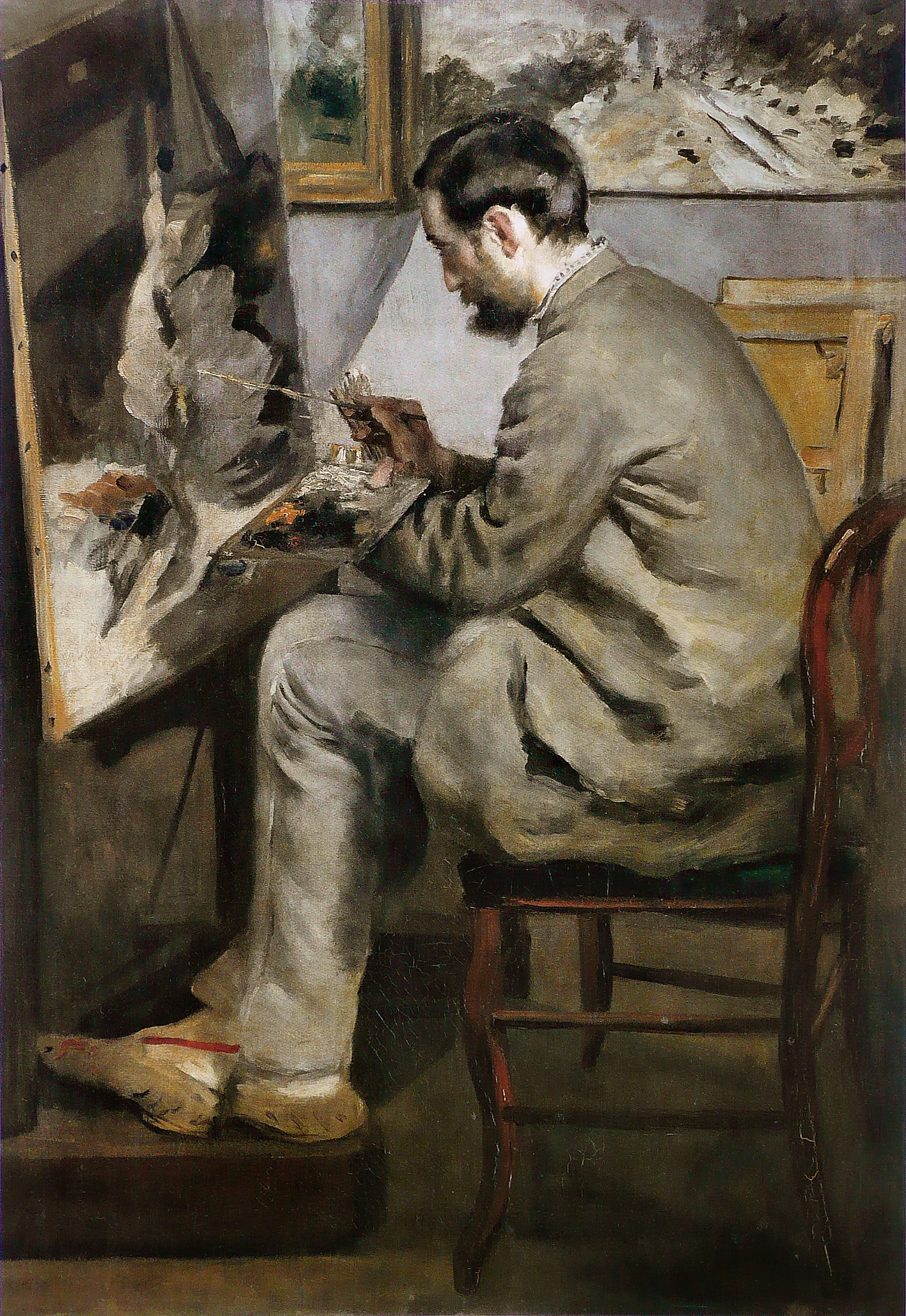
Pierre-Auguste Renoir, Frédéric Bazille painting The Heron

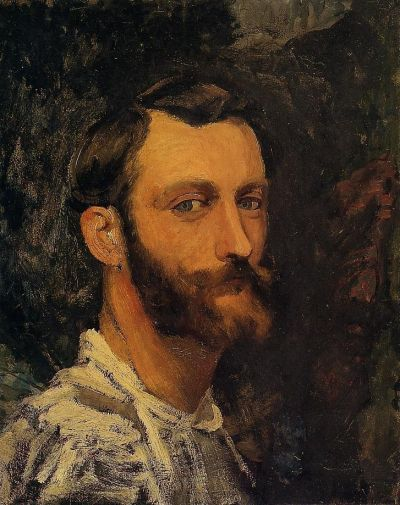
Self Portrait, unknown date

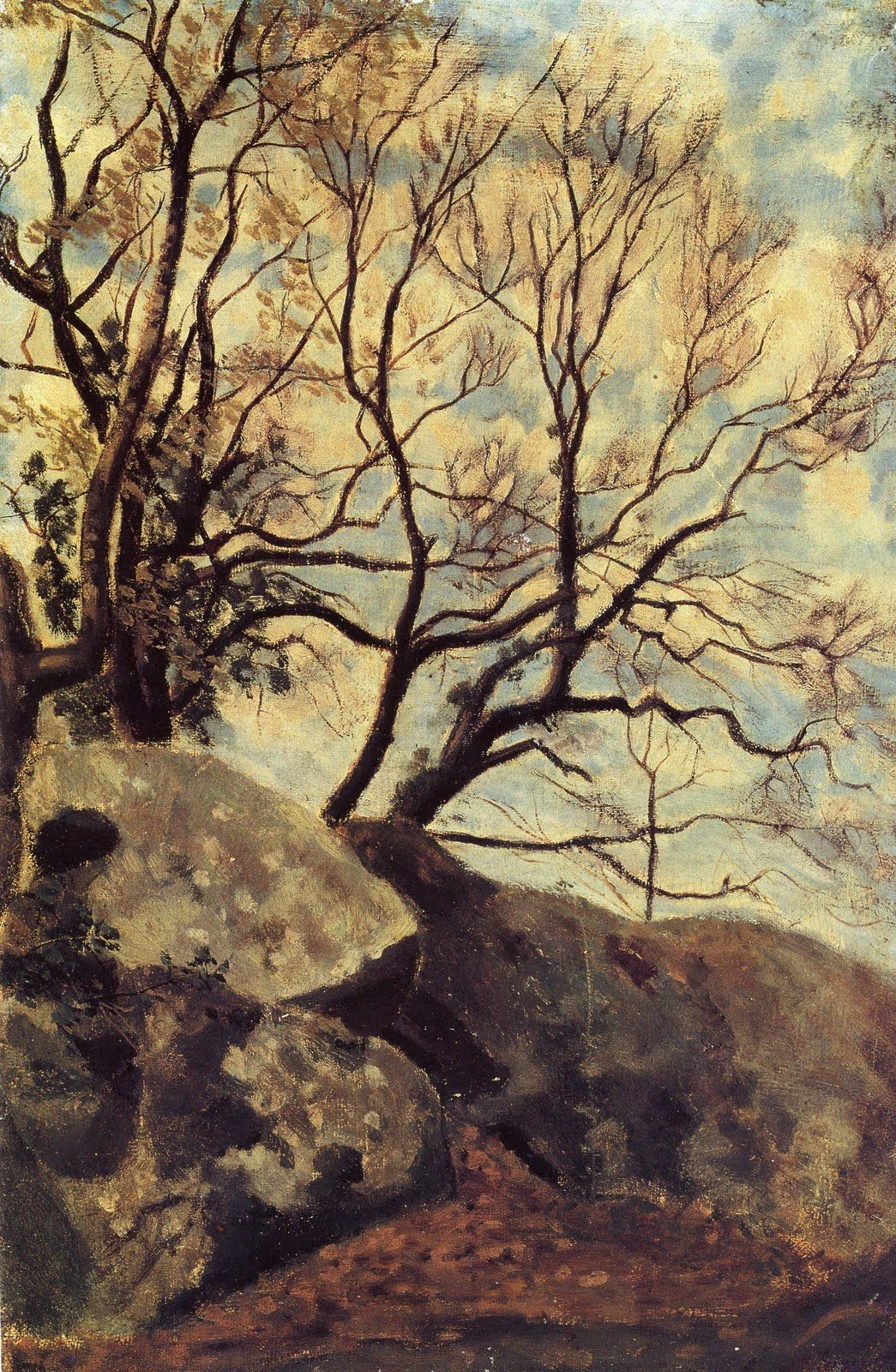
Study of Trees, 1863

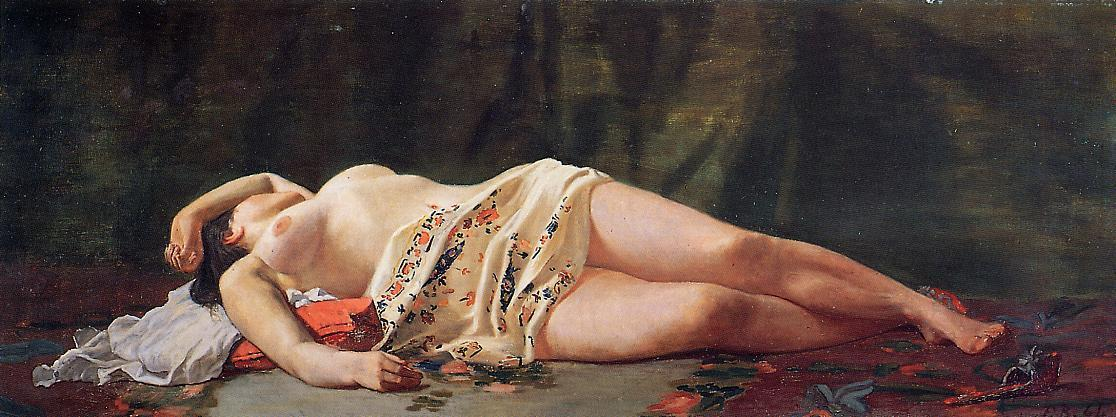
Reclining Nude, 1864

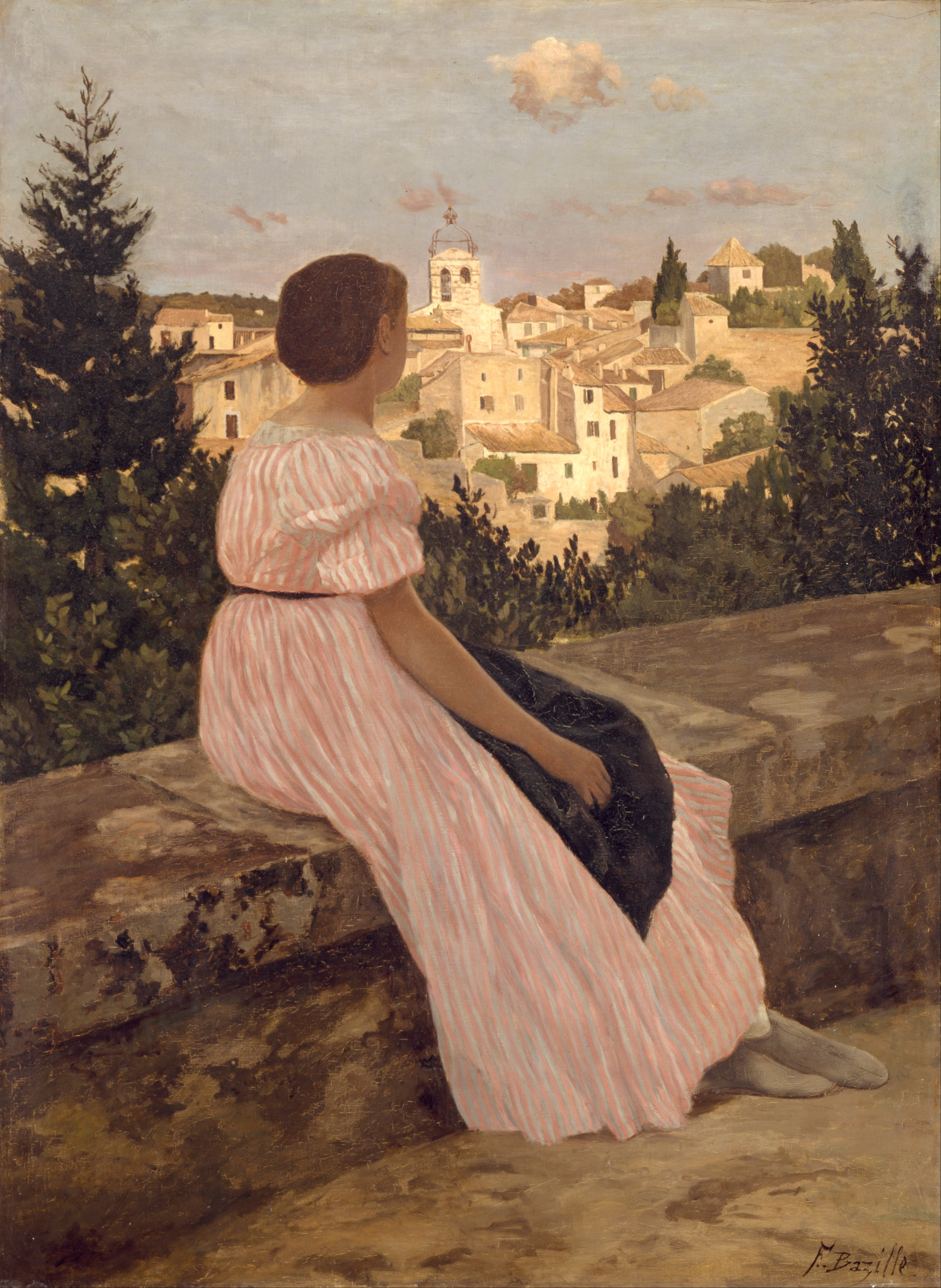
The Pink Dress (View of Castelnau-le-Lez, Hérault), 1864, oil on canvas, Musée d'Orsay

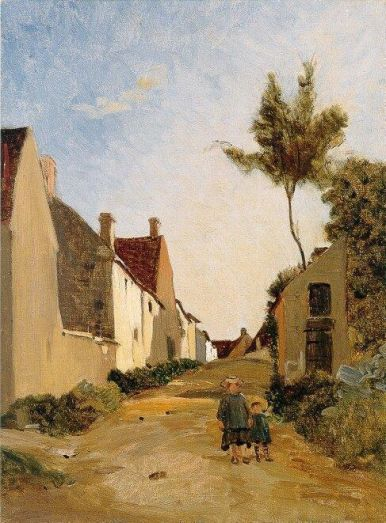
Chailly, 1865, Musée Fabre, Montpellier

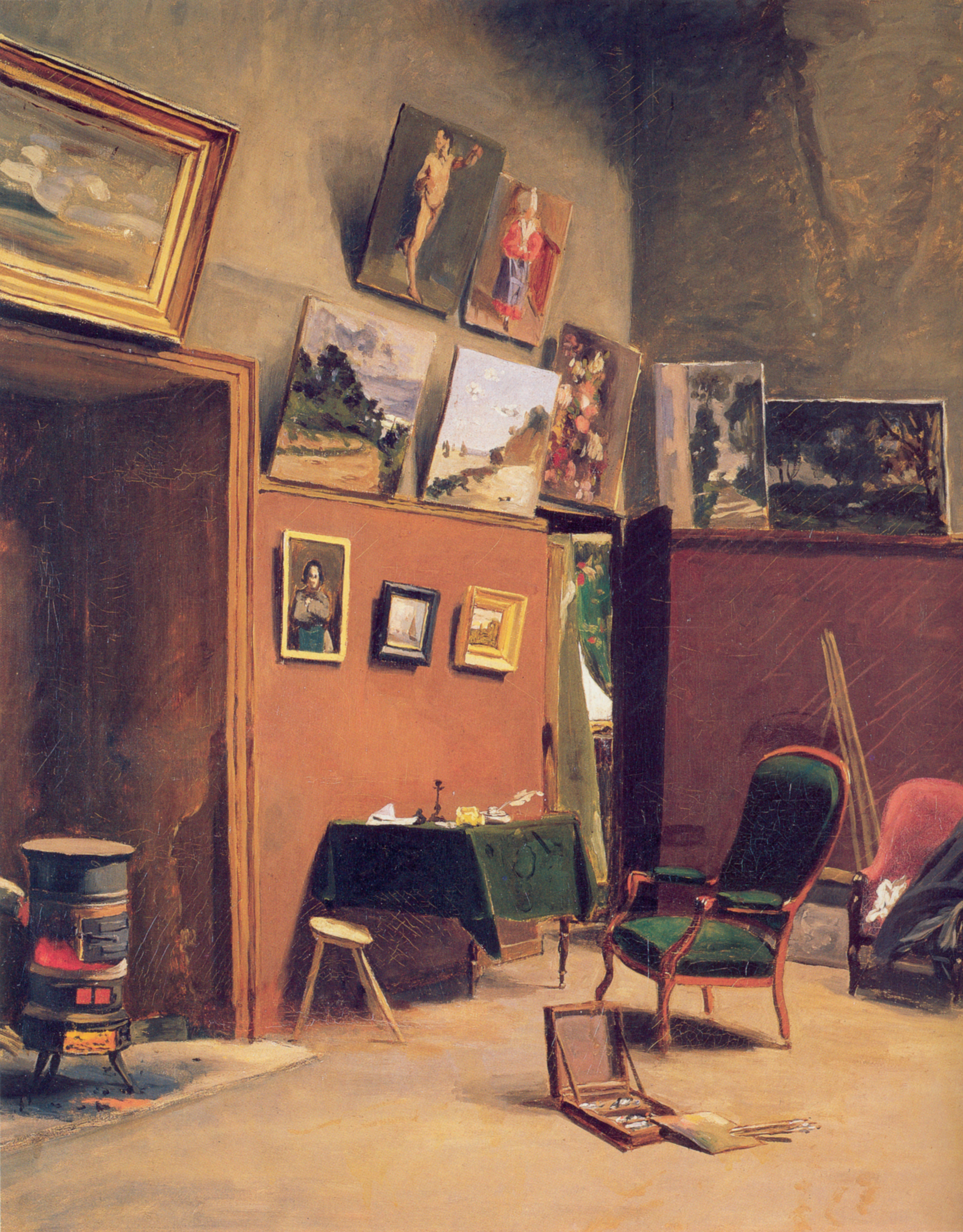
Studio on Rue Furstenberg, 1865, Musée Fabre, Montpellier

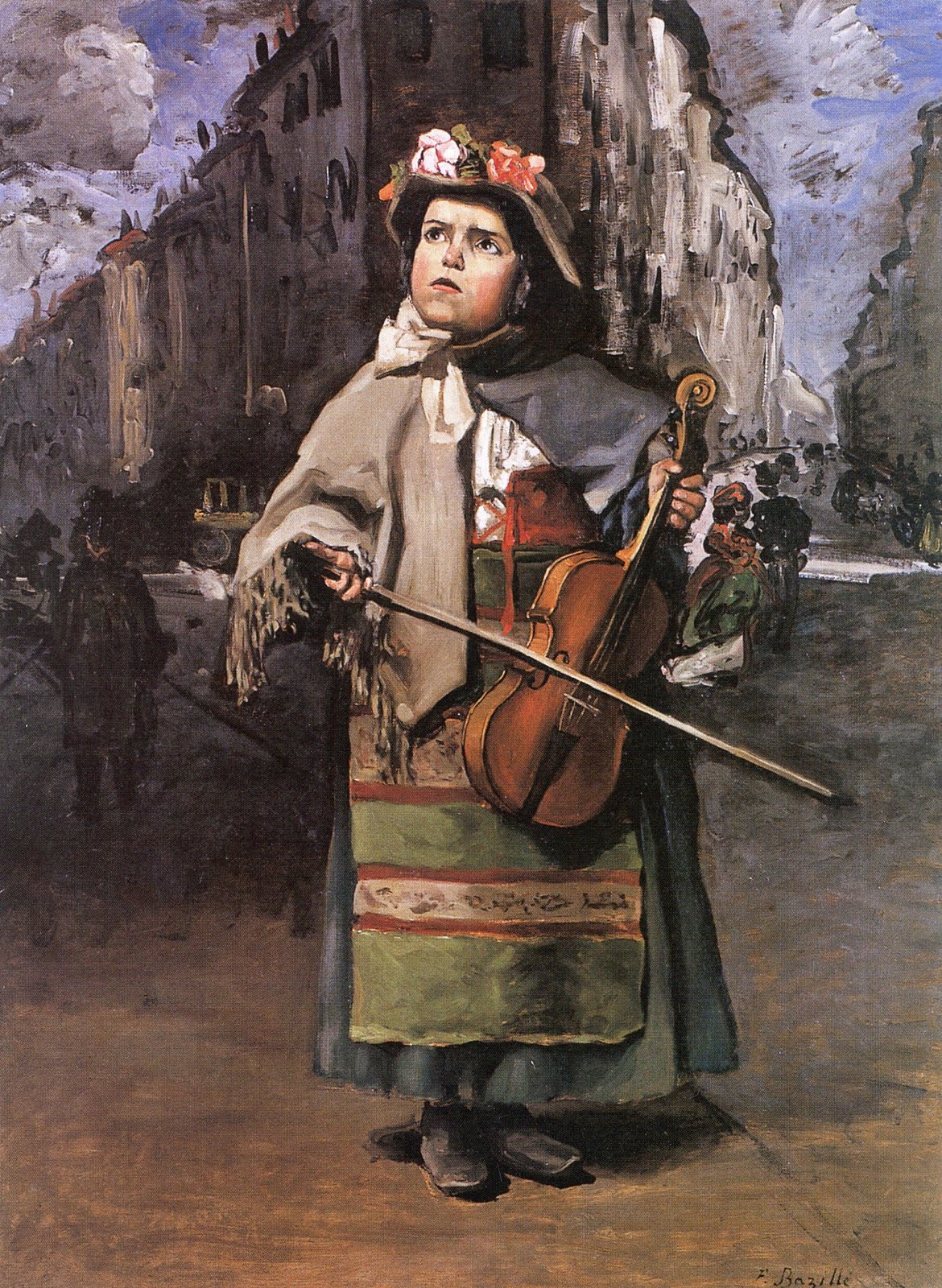
Little Italian Street Singer, 1866

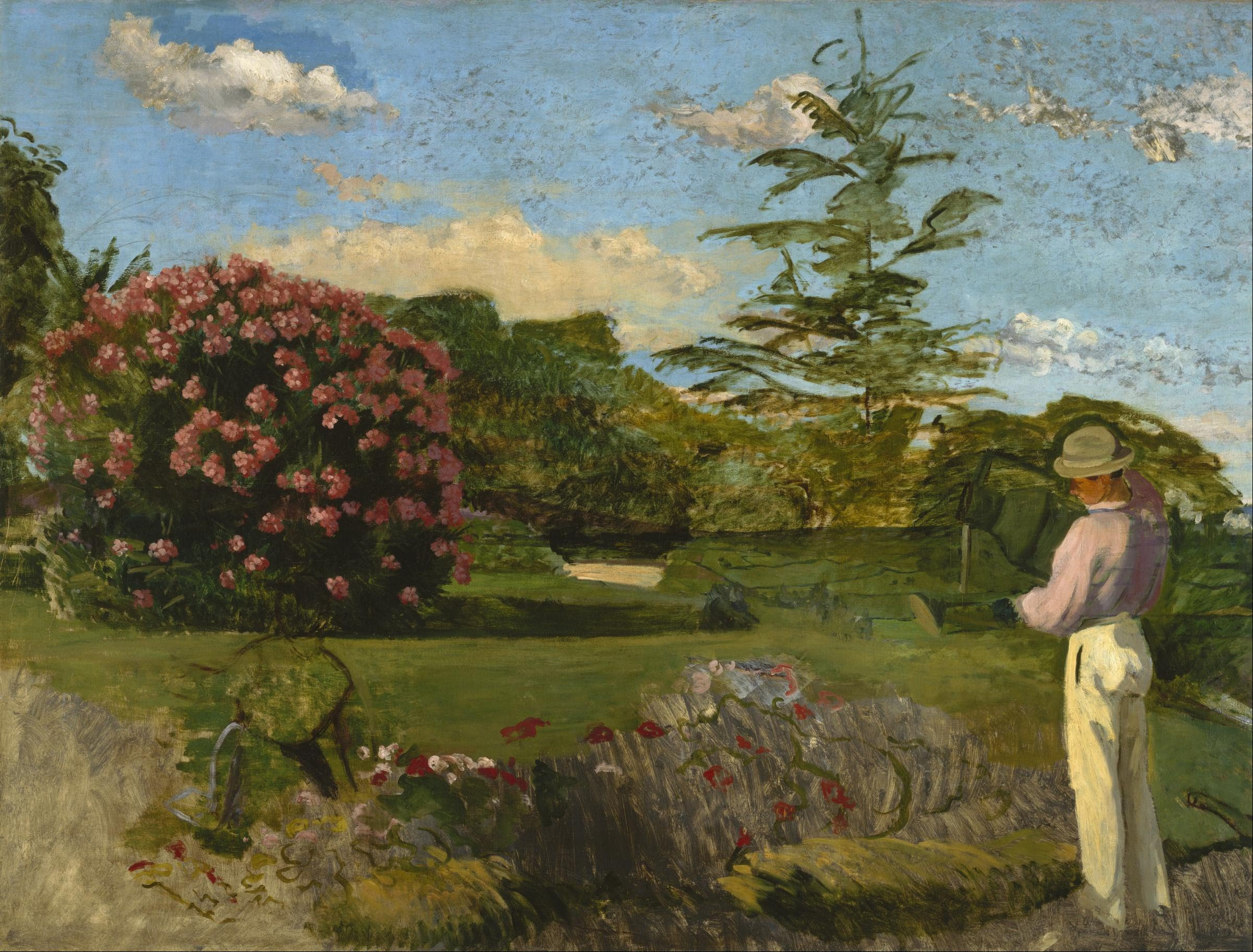
Le Petit Jardinier (The Little Gardener), c. 1866–67, oil on canvas Museum of Fine Arts, Houston

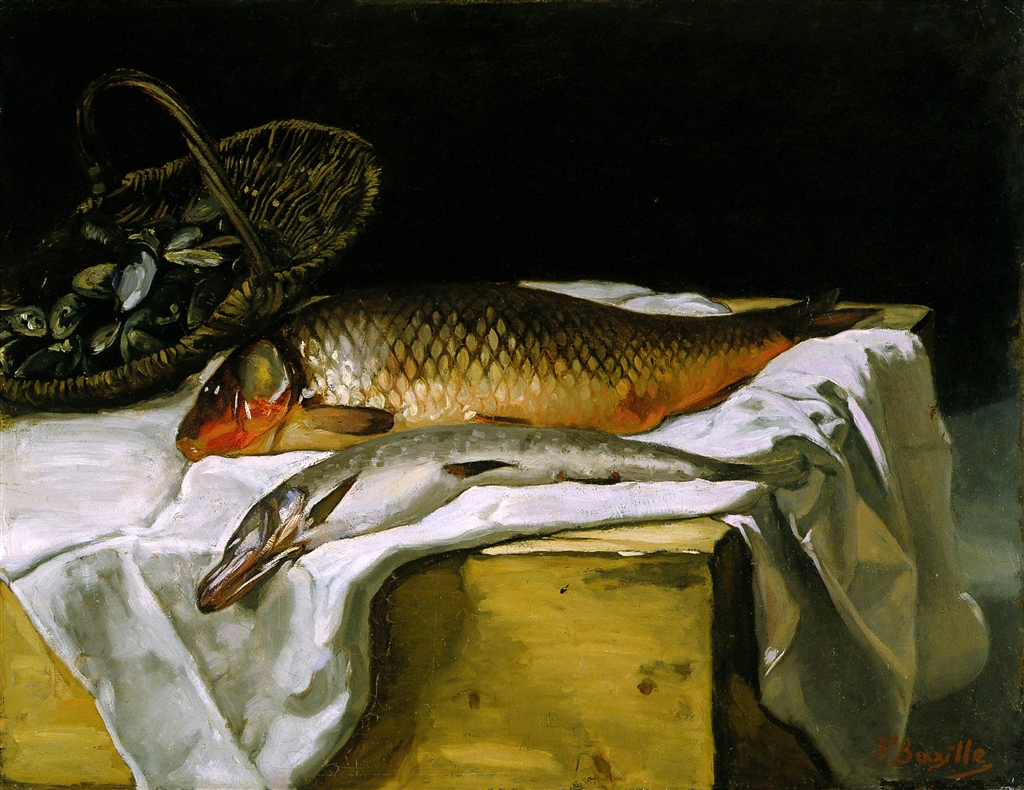
Nature morte avec du poisson, Still life with fish, c. 1866–67

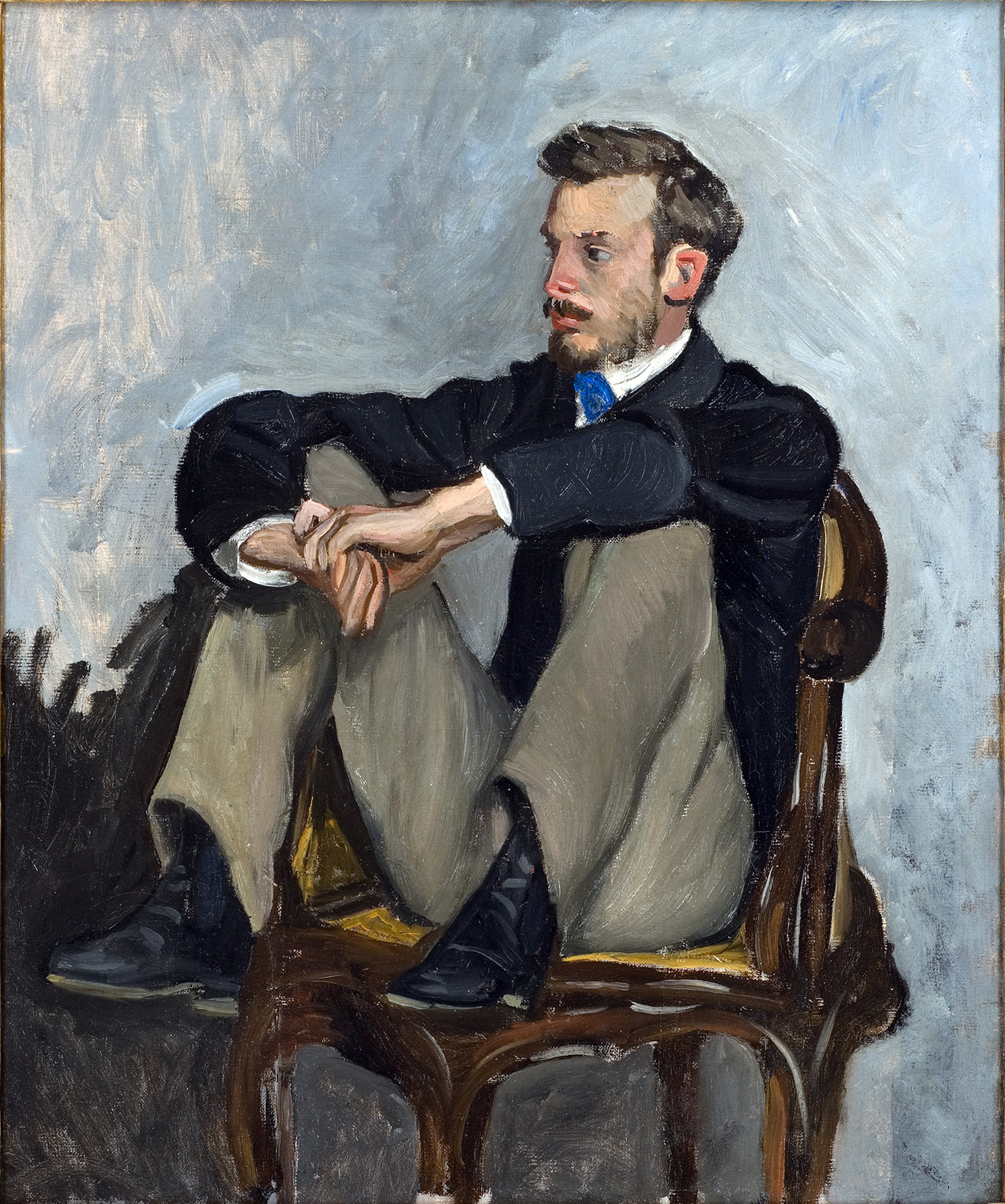
Portrait of Renoir, 1867, oil on canvas, Musée d'Orsay

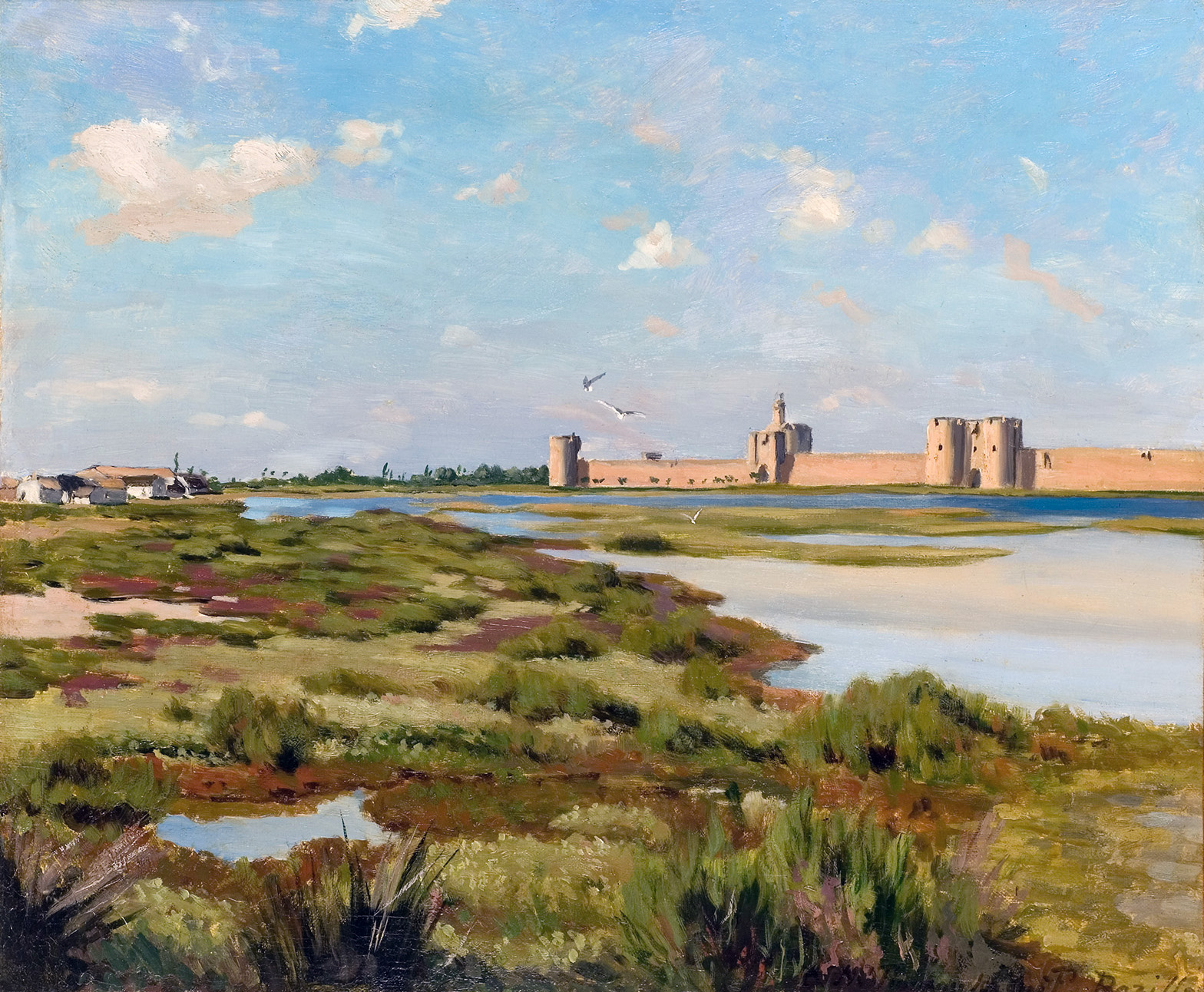
Aigues-Mortes, 1867

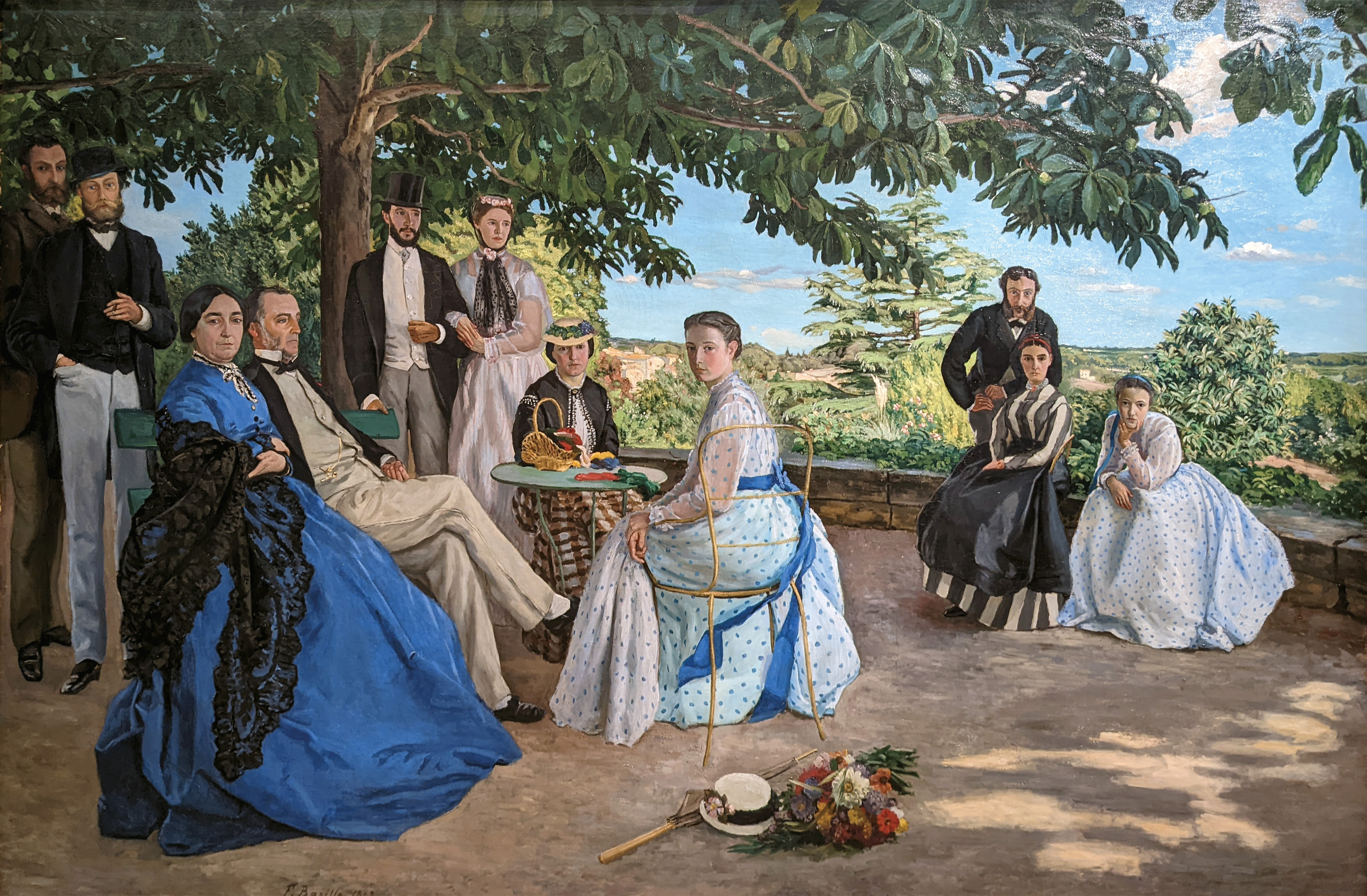
The Family Reunion, c. 1867, Musée d'Orsay

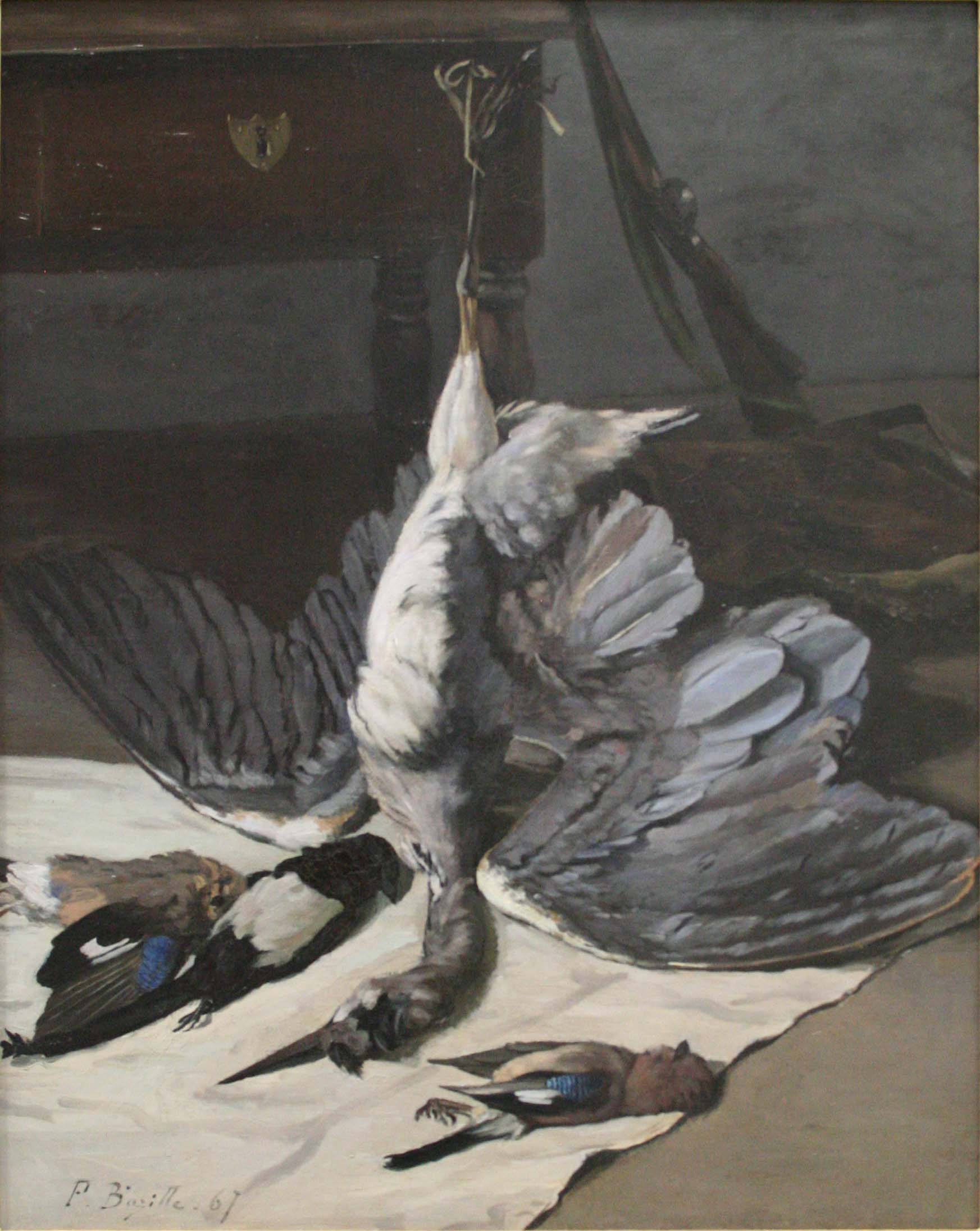
Nature morte au héron, 1867

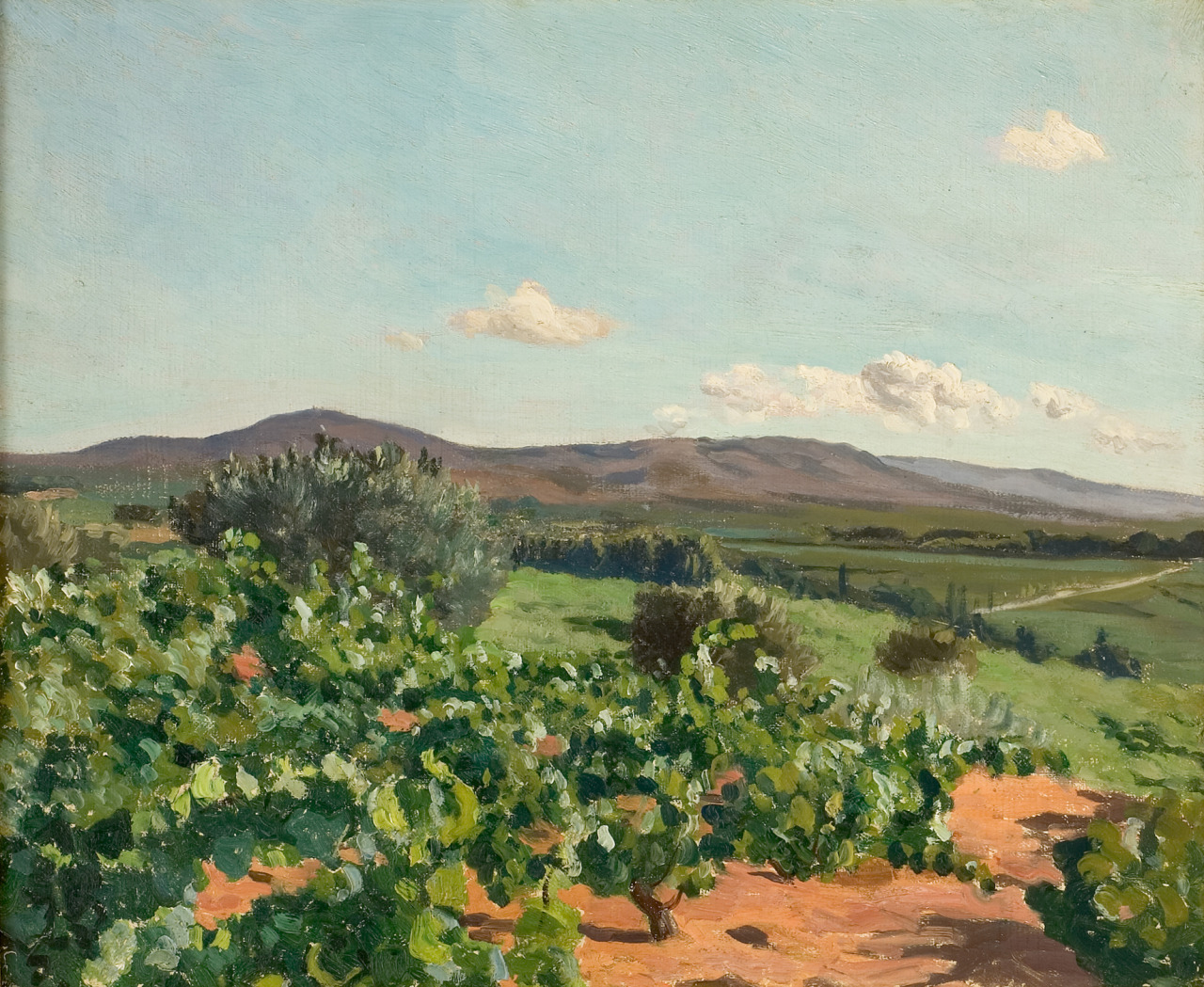
Etude pour une vendange, 1868

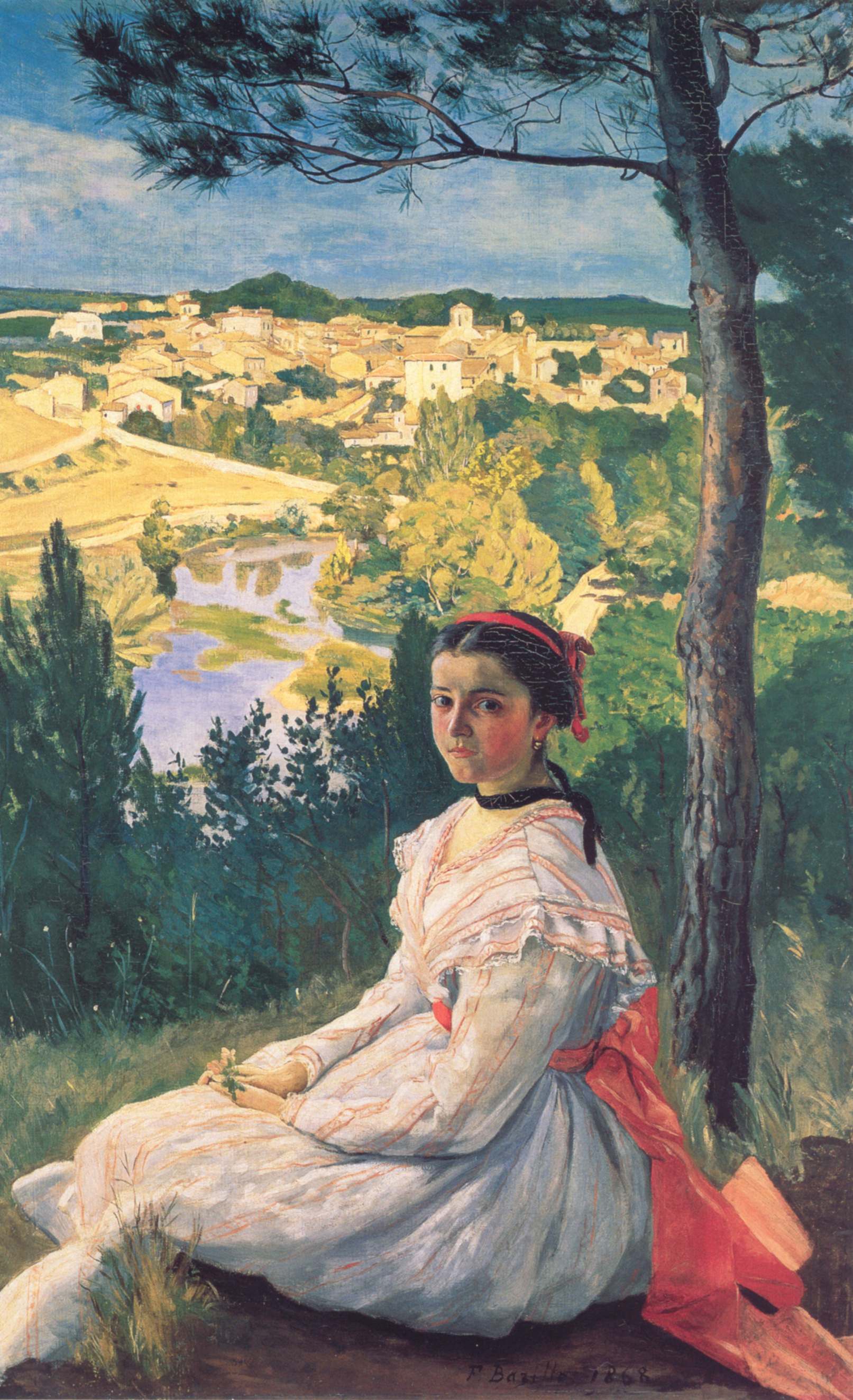
View of the Village, 1868, Musée Fabre, Montpellier

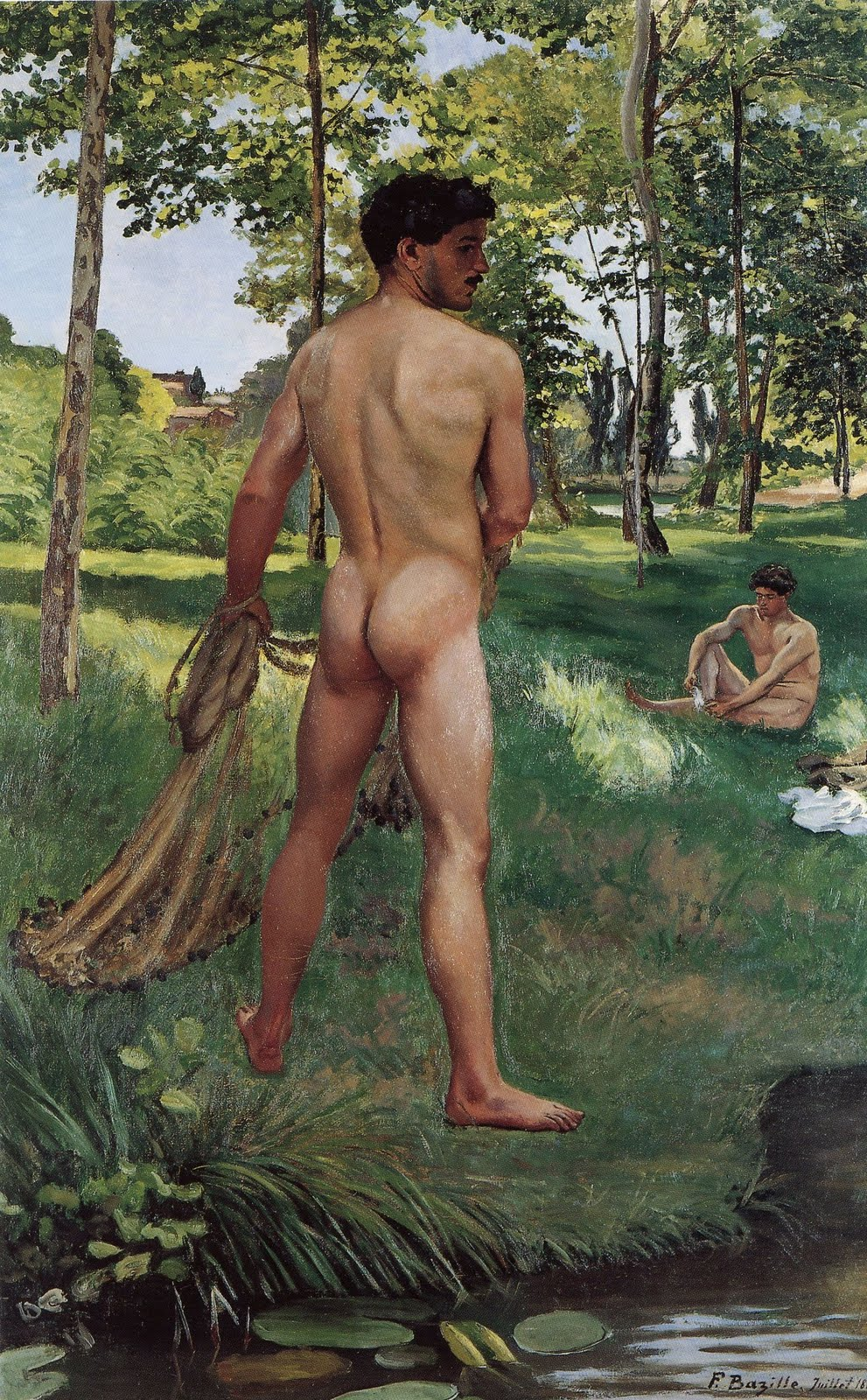
Fisherman with a Net, 1868

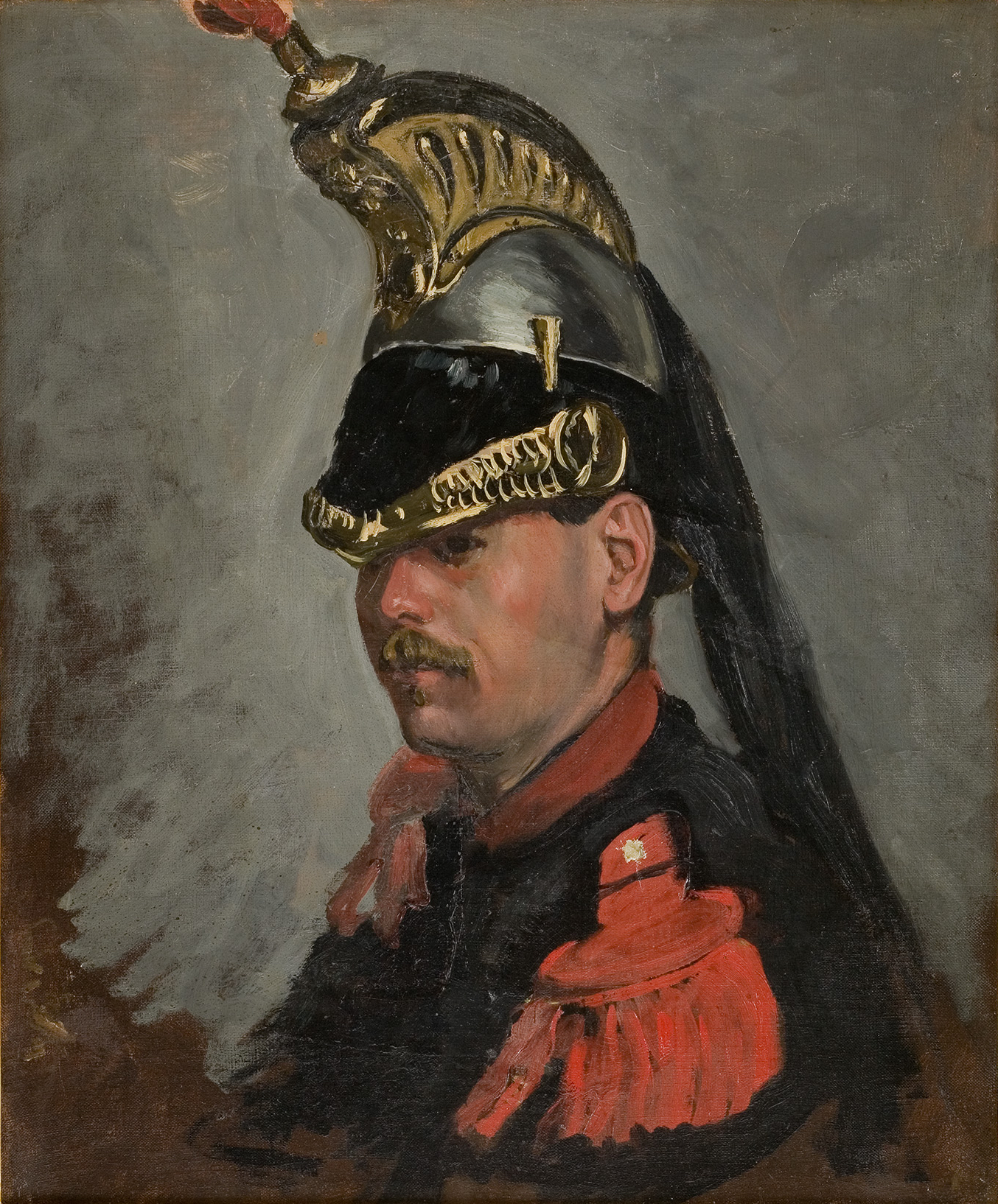
Portrait of Alphonse Tissie, 1868, Musée Fabre, Montpellier

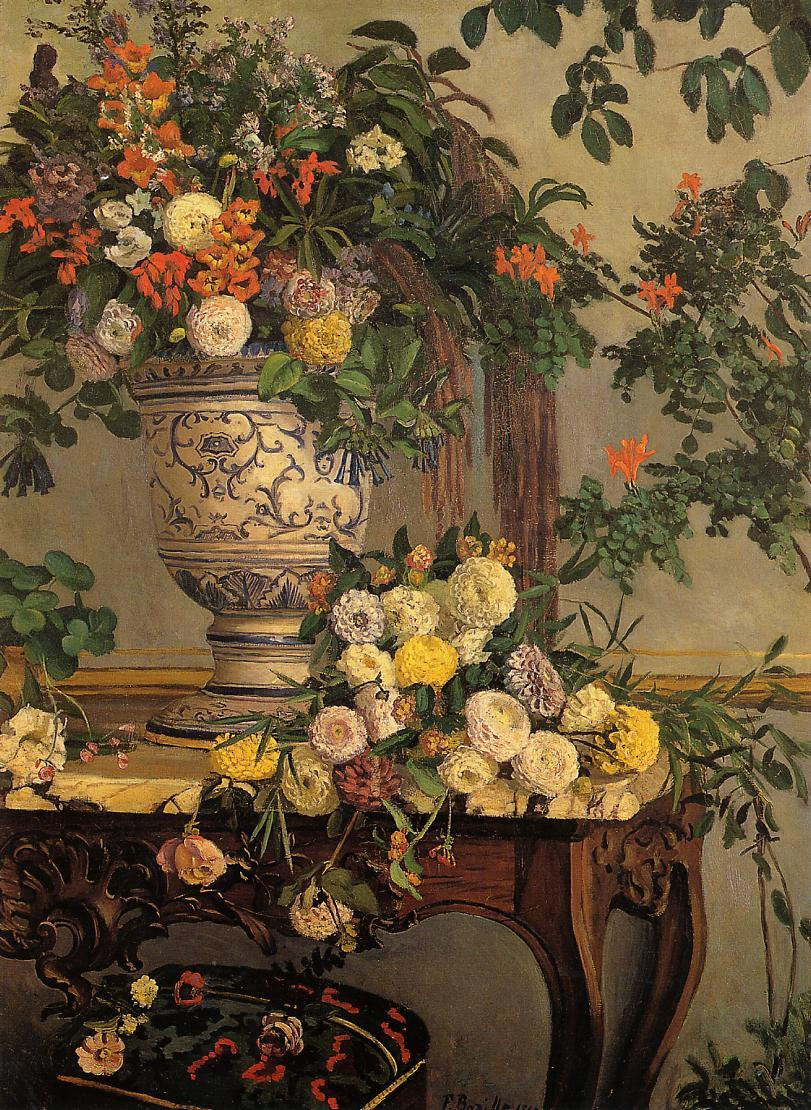
Flowers, 1868

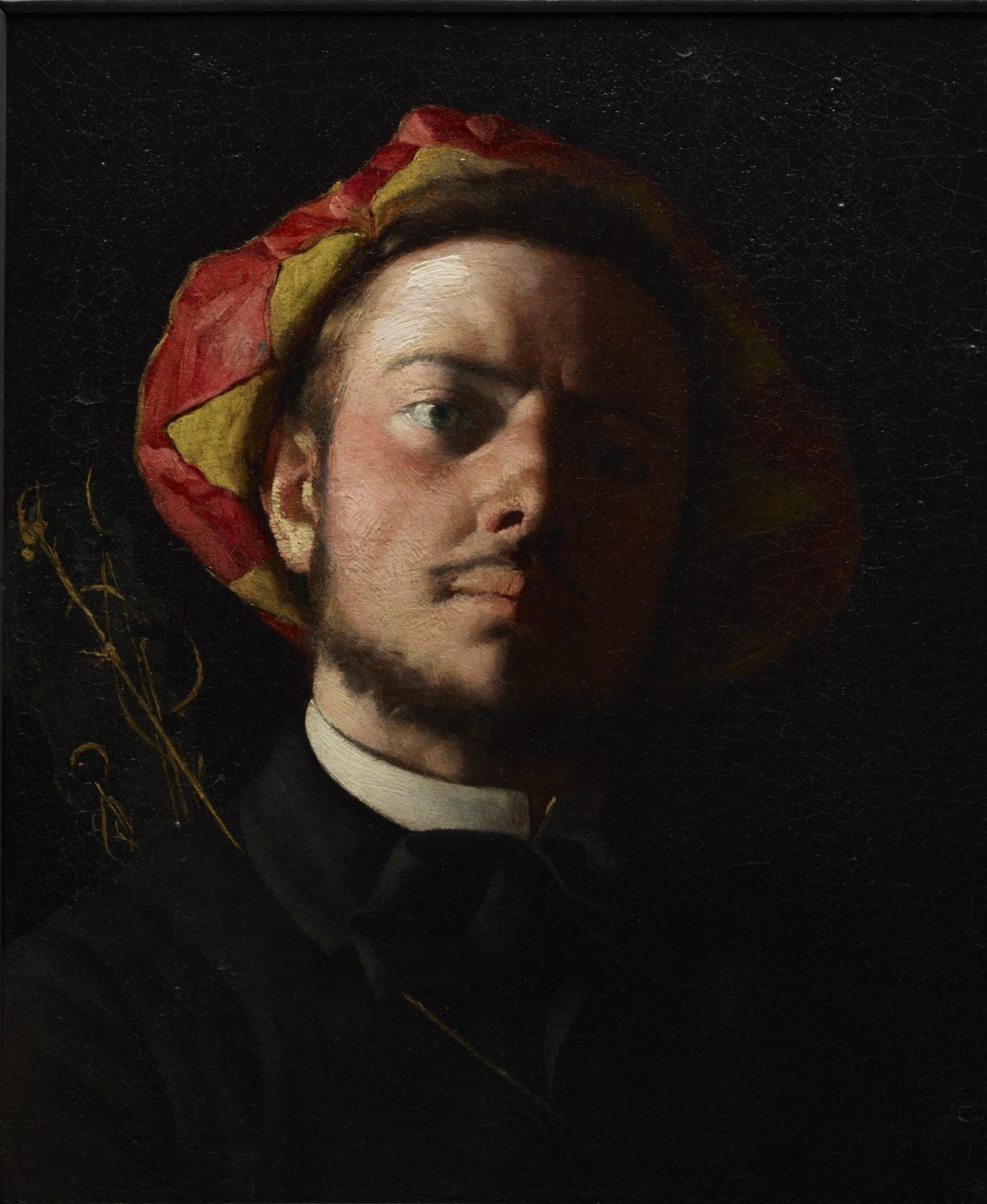
Portrait of Paul Verlaine, 1868, Dallas Museum of Art

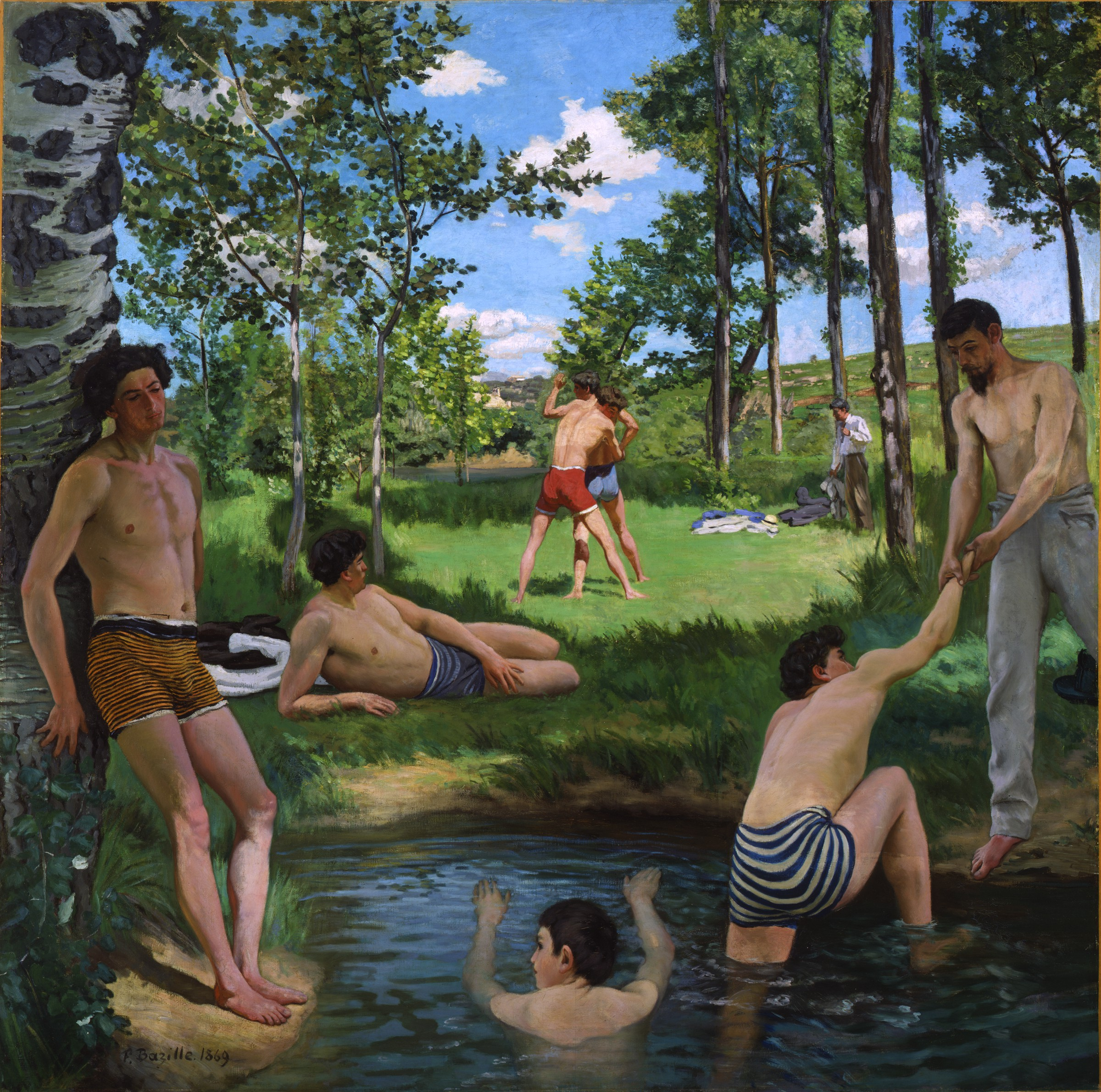
Scène d'été, 1869, Fogg Art Museum, Cambridge, Massachusetts

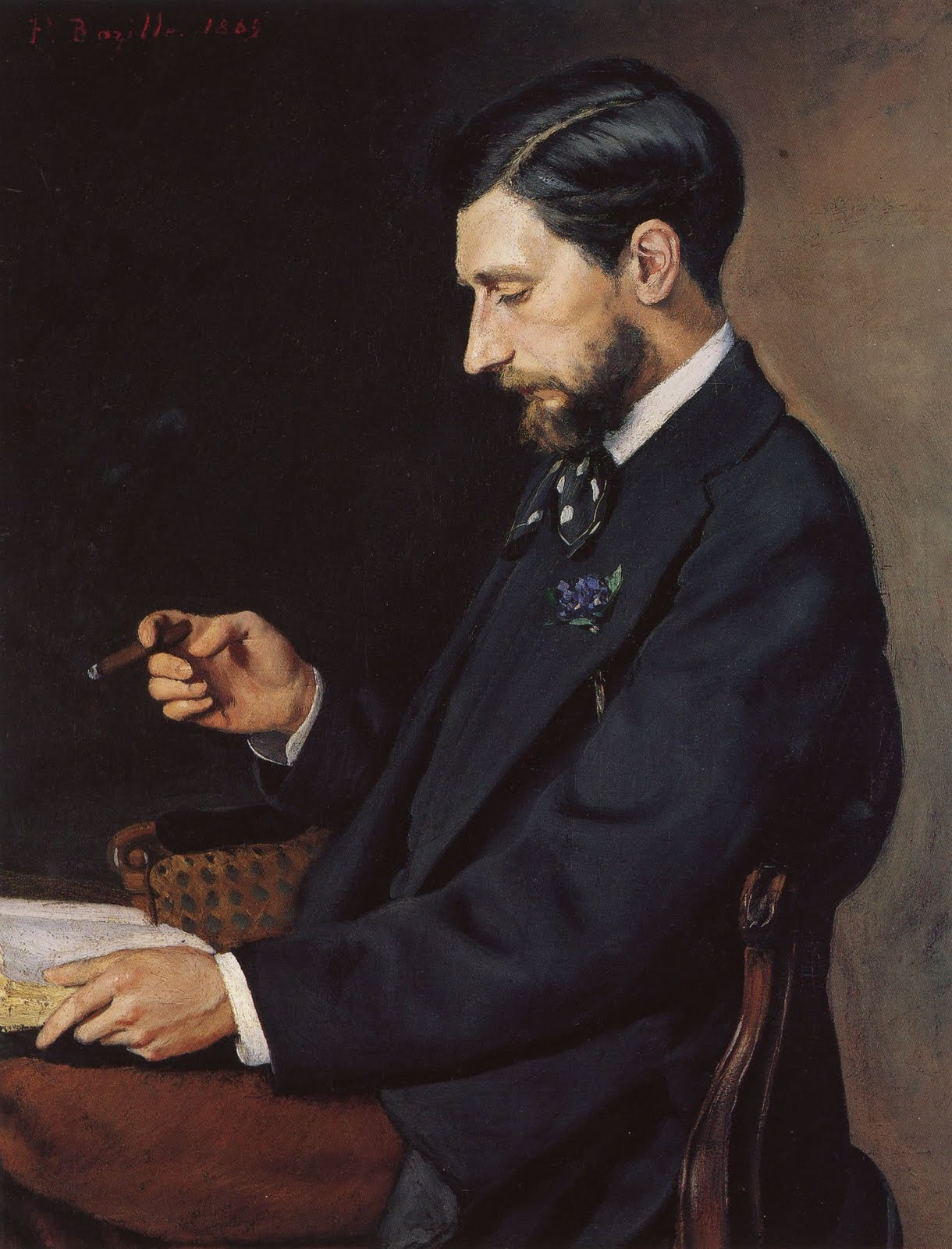
Portrait of Edmond Maître, 1869

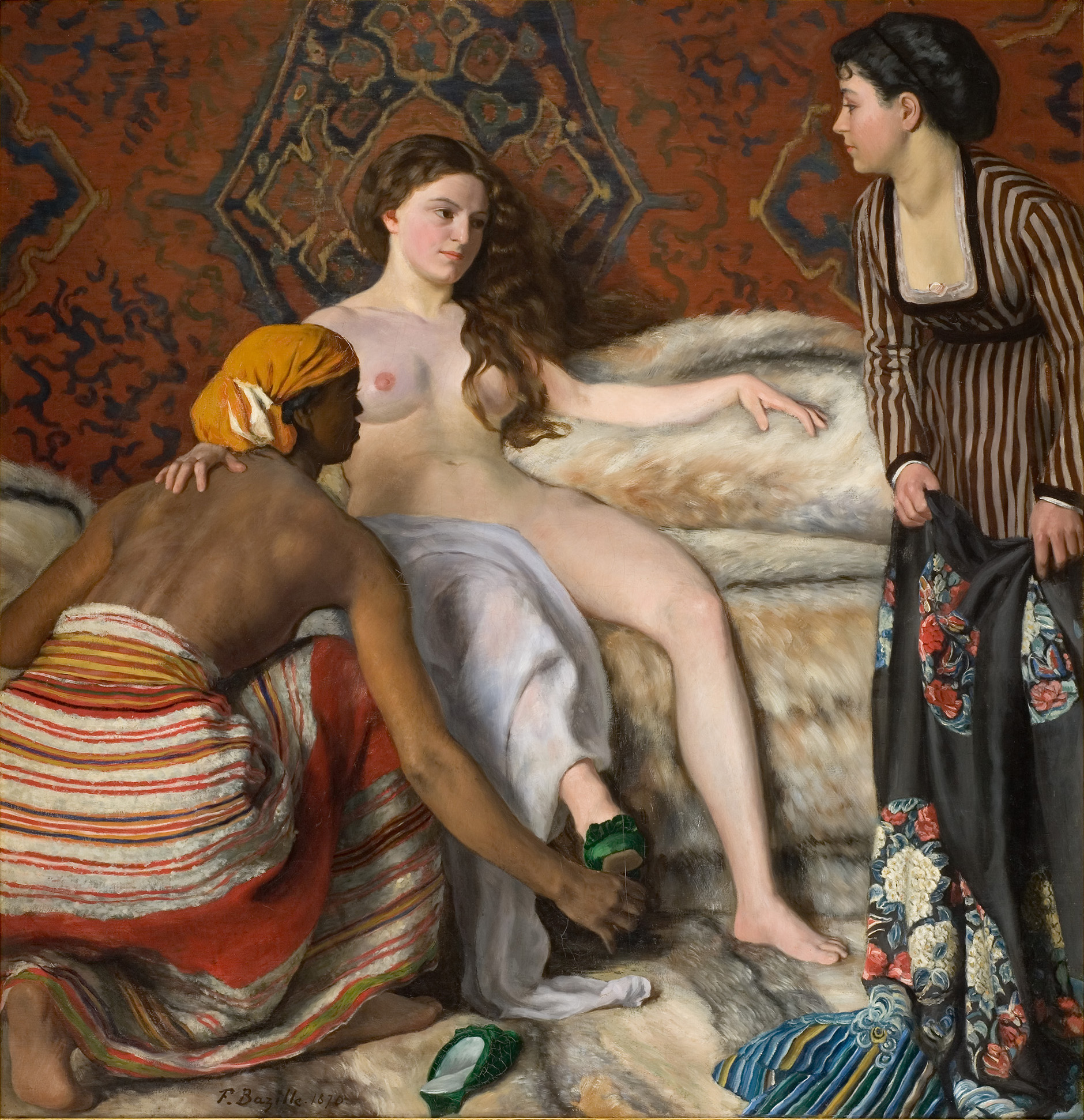
La Toilette, 1870, Musée Fabre

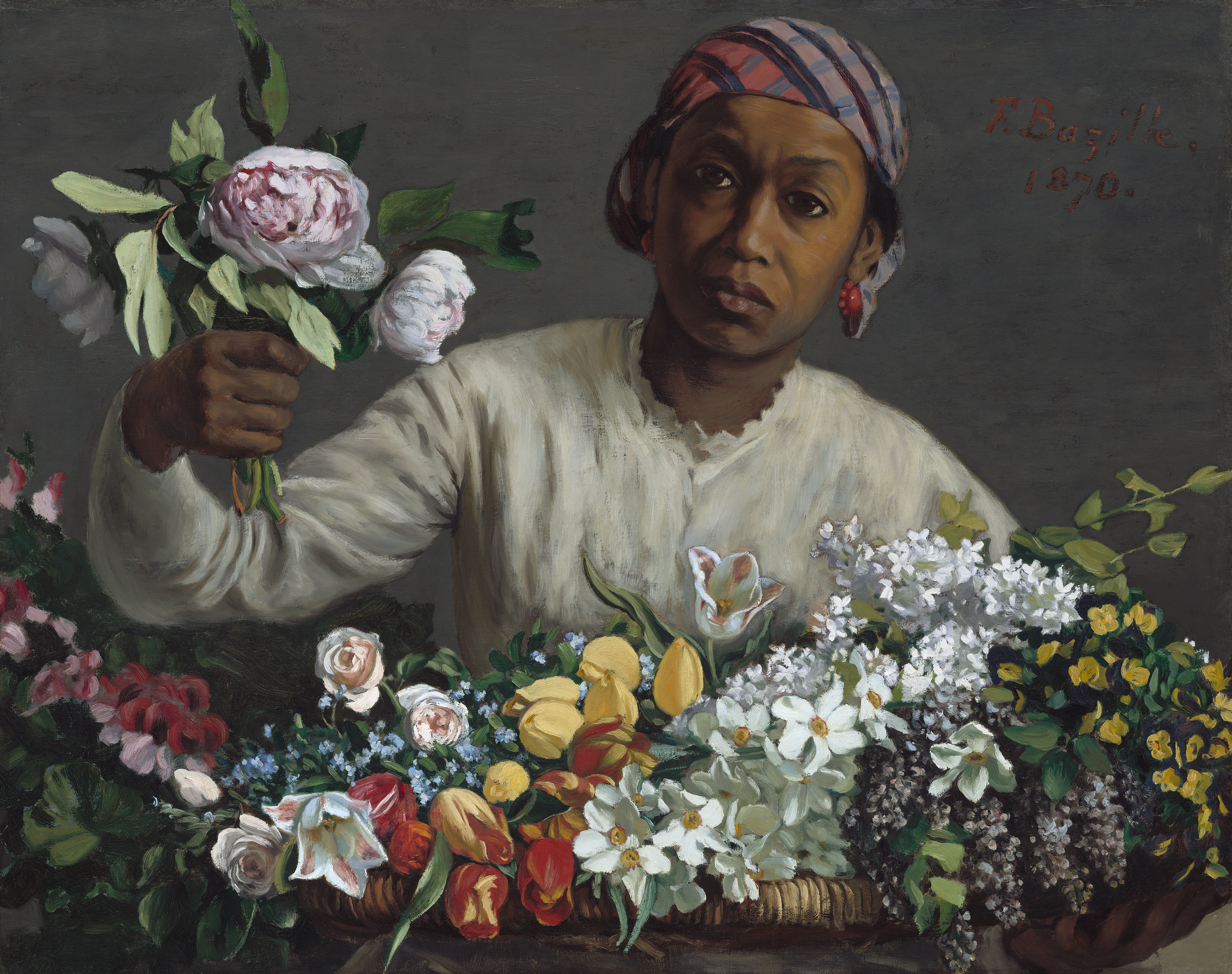
Black Woman with Peonies, 1870, National Gallery of Art

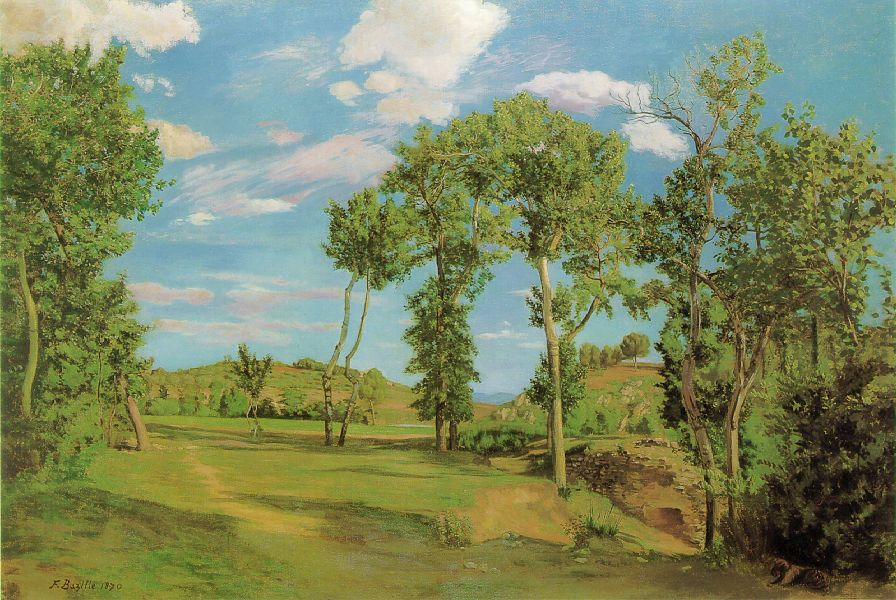
Paysage au bord du Lez, 1870, oil on canvas, Minneapolis Institute of Arts

== See also ==
- A Studio at Les Batignolles
- List of paintings by Frédéric Bazille
