= Edmond Maître =

French art collector (1840–1898)

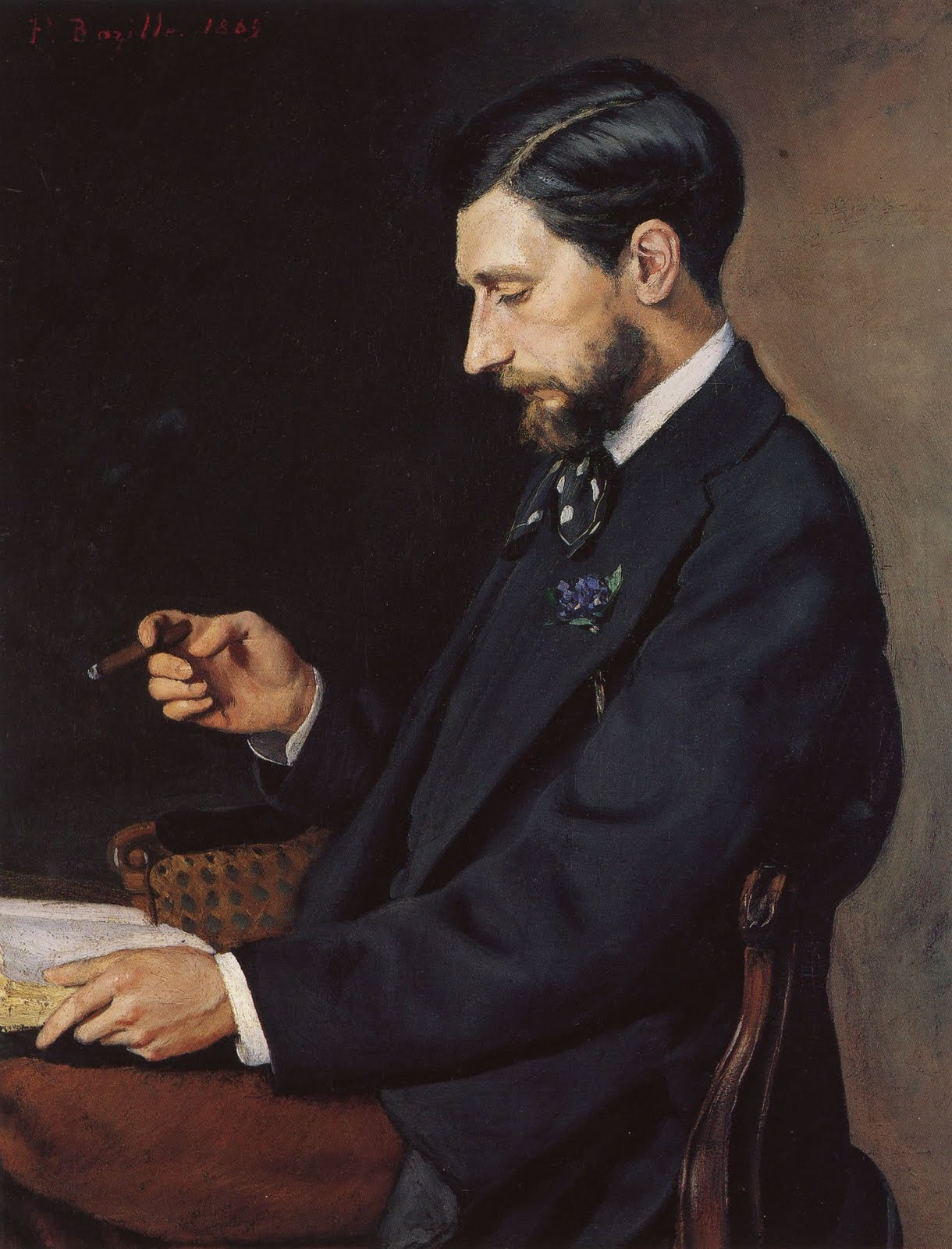
- Portrait of Edmond Maître by Frédéric Bazille, 1869
- Born: Louis Edmond Maître; April 23, 1840; Bordeaux, France
- Died: May 29, 1898 (aged 58); 6th arrondissement of Paris, France
- Known for: Musician

Edmond Maître (April 23, 1840 – May 29, 1898) was a French writer, musician, and art collector, best known for his support and association with the Impressionists and his close friendship with Frédéric Bazille and Pierre-Auguste Renoir. His partner, Rapha Maître, was a model for several works by Renoir.
