= Ruth et Booz =

Painting by Frédéric Bazille

- Ruth and Boaz
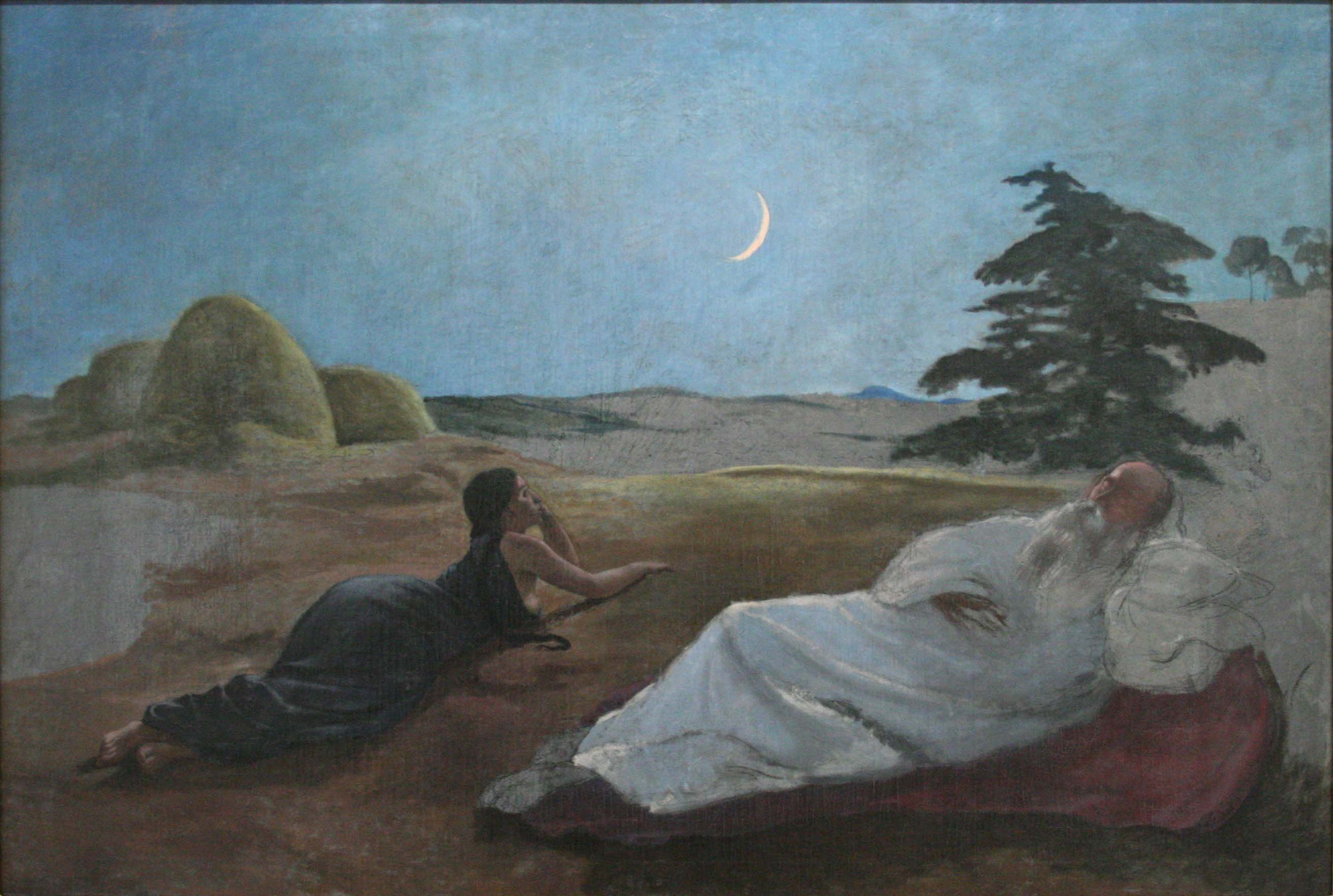
- Artist: Frédéric Bazille
- Year: 1870
- Medium: Oil on canvas
- Dimensions: 138 cm × 202 cm (54 in × 80 in)
- Location: Musee Fabre; Montpellier
- Accession: 2004.13.1

Ruth et Booz is an oil-on-canvas painting by the 19th-century French impressionist artist Frédéric Bazille, executed in 1870, which has been in the collection of the Musée Fabre in Montpellier, France since 2004.

== Overview ==
Religious art was an unusual theme for Bazille, who is more associated with landscapes and portraits. This painting is a night scene from the Book of Ruth in the Old Testament, depicting the patriarch Boaz sleeping under a night sky with a crescent moon. According to the Bible, Boaz notices Ruth, a widowed Moabite and relative of his, gleaning grain in his fields. He soon learns of her difficult circumstances, as well as her kindness and loyalty to her mother-in-law, Naomi. In the evening, acting on the instructions of Naomi to seduce Boaz, Ruth visits him while he is sleeping and places herself under his power. He later agrees to marry her, and their grandson is David. Bazille depicts Ruth at some distance to Boaz, with her head raised on one elbow. Although her breast is provocatively exposed, she is gazing pensively at the Moon instead of the sleeping Boaz. The theme of Boaz and Ruth was a popular theme with the Paris Salon orthodoxy at the time, and this work may have been reaction by Bazille to the Salon's rejection of his La Toilette earlier that year. However, the scene he chose draws heavily on Victor Hugo's poem Booz endormi, from his 1859 La Légende des siècles. Bazille had also visited the studio of Alexandre Cabanel in 1869 and had an opportunity to see Cabanel's version of Ruth et Booz, based on the same poem.

The painting is mentioned by Bazille in correspondence to his father in late June 1870, in the same letter in which he mentions the "large landscape" now known as Paysage au bord du Lez. In this letter he describes the painting as only half-finished, and it appears to have remained in this state when the Franco-Prussian War erupted and Bazille volunteered for service in a Zouave regiment in August 1870. Bazille would never be able to return to complete the work. On November 28, 1870, he was with his unit at the Battle of Beaune-la-Rolande when, his commanding officer having been injured, he took command and led an assault on the Prussian positions. He was hit twice in the failed attack and was killed in action at the age of twenty-eight.

== The lost Jeune fille au piano ==
When Ruth et Booz was X-rayed during preparations for the exhibition “Frédéric Bazille and the Birth of Impressionism,” at the National Gallery of Art in Washington, DC in 2017, one of Bazille's lost works was rediscovered. Jeune fille au piano (Young Woman at the Piano) was a work which he had completed in 1866. Bazille described the work in great detail in correspondence with his mother, including the green satin colors of the model's dress and dimensions of the painting, and he also mentioned that it had been praised by Gustave Courbet. Bazille had intended on making it his debut work at the Paris Salon, the official art exhibition of the Académie des Beaux-Arts, which was arguably the greatest annual or biennial art event in the Western world. Acceptance at this exhibition would have ensured Bazille's career in the orthodoxy of French painting. The Salon rejected Bazille's Jeune fille au piano, although they did accept his more mundane "Still Life with Fish", which became Bazille's debut work.

It is not certain why Bazille painted over this composition; however, despite his relative wealth, Bazille for known for recycling many of his rejected compositions.

== See also ==
- List of paintings by Frédéric Bazille
