= Landscape by the Lez River =

Painting by Frédéric Bazille

Paysage au bord du Lez
- Landscape on the banks of the Lez
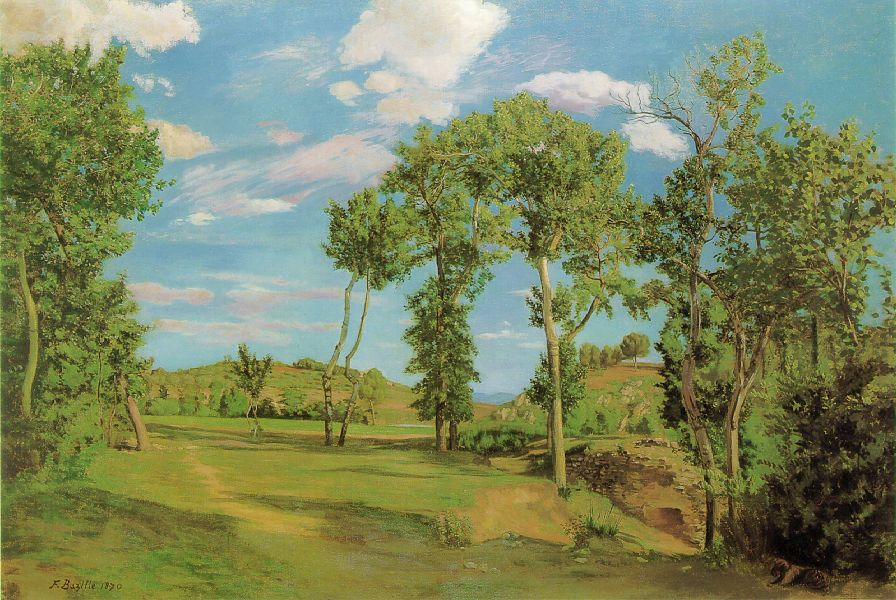
- Artist: Frédéric Bazille
- Year: 1870
- Medium: Oil on canvas
- Movement: Impressionism
- Subject: landscape
- Dimensions: 138.4 cm × 201.9 cm (54.5 in × 79.5 in)
- Location: Minneapolis Institute of Arts; Minneapolis
- Accession: 69.23

Landscape by the Lez River (French: Paysage au bord du Lez) is an oil-on-canvas landscape painting by the 19th-century French impressionist artist Frédéric Bazille, completed in 1870. It is the collection of the Minneapolis Institute of Arts.

== Overview ==
This painting is Bazille's last known completed work. In June 1870, Bazille wrote in a letter to his father: "I have just about finished a large landscape (eclogue)." The Franco-Prussian War erupted only two weeks later, and Bazille volunteered for service in a Zouave regiment in August. On November 28 of the same year, he was with his unit at the Battle of Beaune-la-Rolande when, his commanding officer having been injured, he took command and led an assault on the Prussian positions. He was hit twice in the failed attack and was killed in action at the age of twenty-eight.

Paysage au bord du Lez is the "large landscape" referred in Bazille's letter to his father. In his letter, he specifically uses the word eclogue, which is usually defined as a poem in a classical style on a pastoral subject. In terms of painting, this implies an image of rustic figures conversing in an Arcadian landscape. However, Bazille's painting, while showing the bucolic sun-drenched and dry landscapes near his native Montpellier, is devoid of figures or any sign of human activity aside from a narrow meandering footpath. The Lez River, the main river of Montpellier, is only hinted at by a very thin pale line towards the center of the image, and the forested gully to the right.

== See also ==
- List of paintings by Frédéric Bazille
