= The Archangel Gabriel (Zurbarán) =

Painting by Francisco de Zurbarán

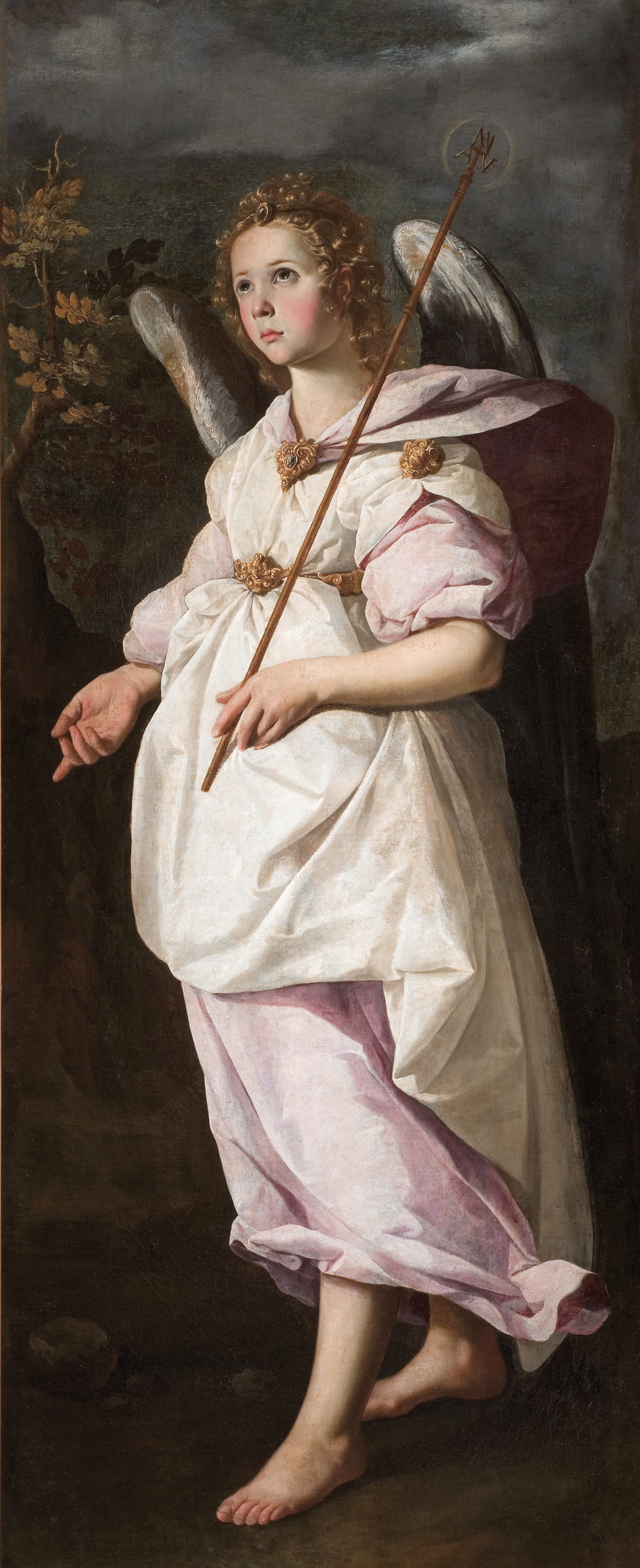
The Archangel Gabriel (1634) by Francisco de Zurbarán

The Archangel Gabriel is a 1634 painting by Francisco de Zurbarán, now in the Musée Fabre in Montpellier.
