= Thérèse reading in the Park at Méric =

1867 painting by Frédéric Bazille

- Thérèse lisant dans le parc de Méric (French)
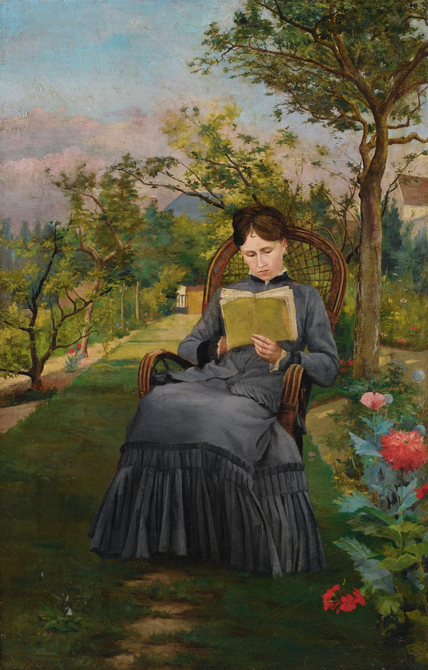
- Artist: Frédéric Bazille
- Year: 1867
- Medium: oil on canvas
- Dimensions: 92 cm × 59.2 cm (36 in × 23.3 in)
- Location: Private collection

Thérèse reading in the Park at Méric (French: Thérèse lisant dans le parc de Méric) is an oil on canvas painting executed in 1867 by the French artist Frédéric Bazille (1841–1870). The work depicts a young woman, identified as Bazille’s cousin Thérèse des Hours, seated outdoors in the grounds of the Méric estate, absorbed in reading a book.

== Subject and context ==
The painting’s title and subject reference Thérèse des Hours, a member of the extended Bazille family who frequently appeared in Bazille’s portraits and genre scenes. Méric was the family’s summer residence in Castelnau‑le‑Lez, and it served as a backdrop for several works by Bazille created in the summers of the 1860s, including his large Réunion de famille and The Terrace at Méric. The serene depiction of reading in an outdoor setting aligns with Bazille’s interest in contemporary leisure and natural light.

== See also ==
- List of paintings by Frédéric Bazille
