= Black Woman with Peonies =

Paintings by Frédéric Bazille

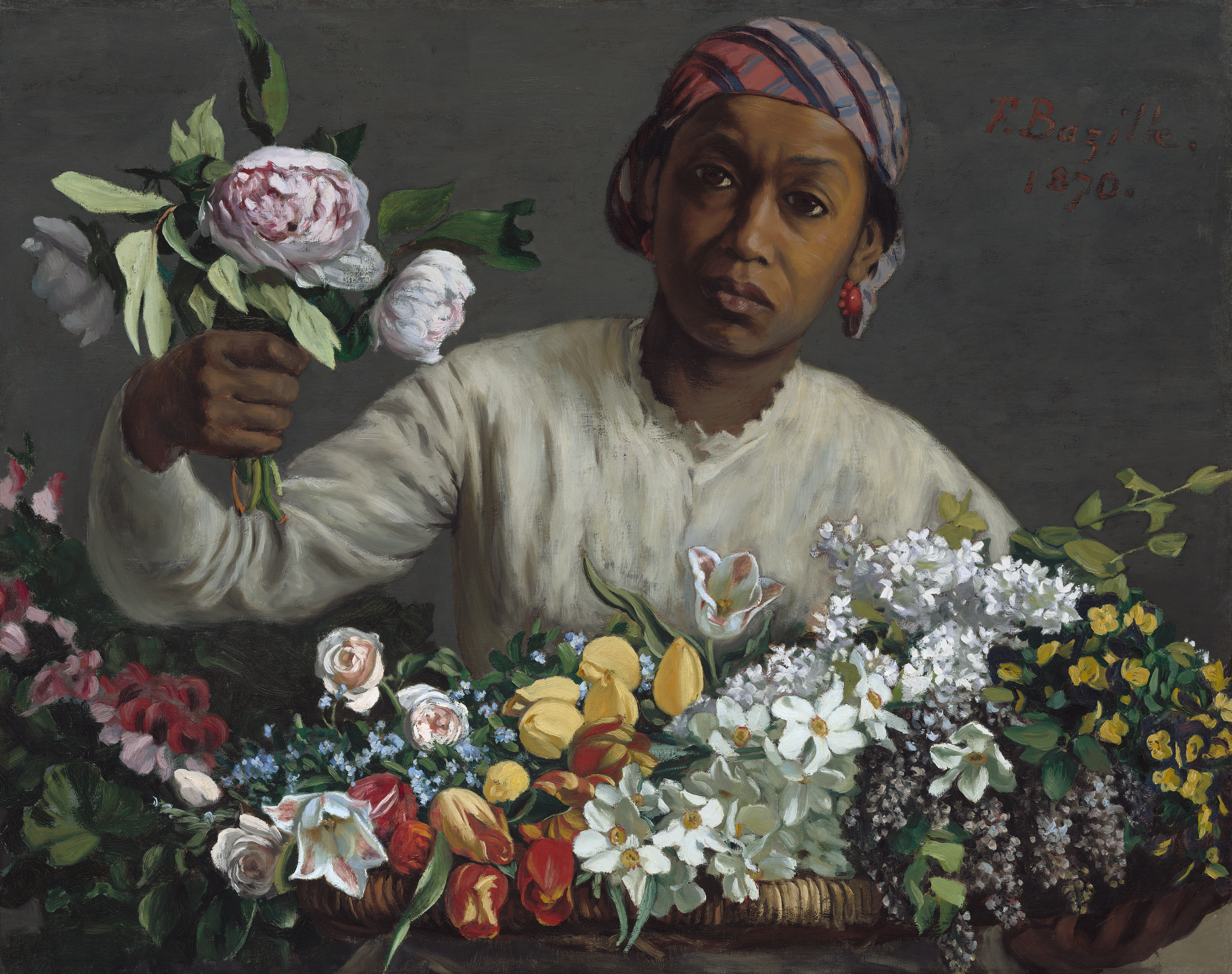
- Artist: Frédéric Bazille
- Year: 1870
- Medium: oil on canvas
- Dimensions: 60 cm × 75 cm (24 in × 30 in)
- Location: National Gallery of Art, Washington, D.C.

Black Woman with Peonies also known as Négresse aux pivoines, Young Woman with Peonies, or Negress with Peonies, is a pair of paintings created by the French Impressionist painter Frédéric Bazille in the spring of 1870. Both paintings are oil on canvas, with one version on display at the National Gallery of Art in Washington, D.C. and the other on view at the Musée Fabre in Montpellier, France. The dimensions of both paintings are 60.3 cm (23.7 in) × 75.2 cm (29.6 in).

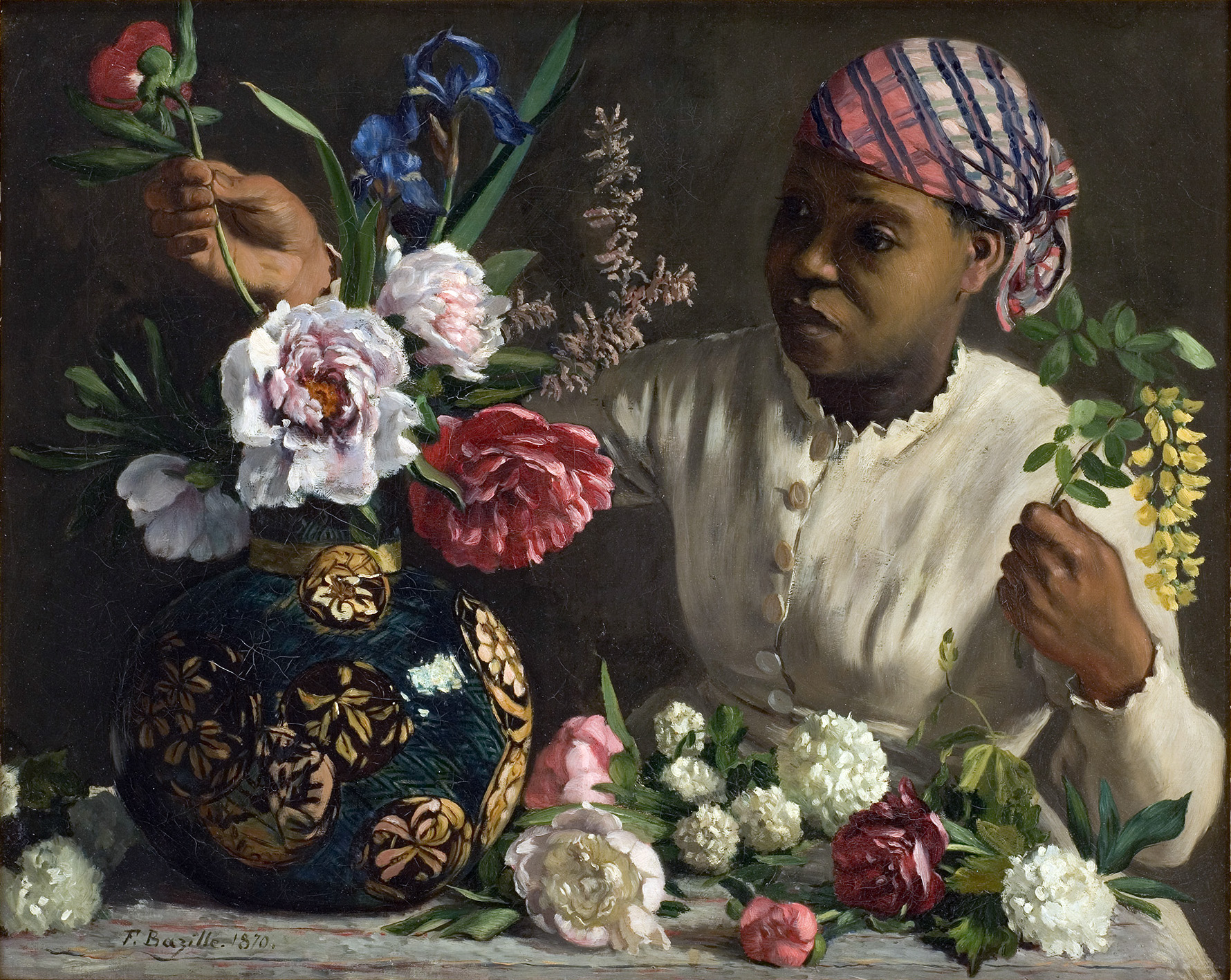
Black Woman with Peonies by Frédéric Bazille (1870) located at the Musée Fabre, Montpellier

The Washington painting depicts a Black woman with a bundle of peonies in her hand, staring directly at the viewer with a basket of flowers in her other arm. In the Montpellier painting, the same woman is shown arranging flowers into a vase, with the remaining flowers resting on a workbench. The subject of the painting is thought to be an homage to Édouard Manet's 1863 oil painting Olympia.

== Background and social context ==
It was at the Paris Salon in 1865 that Bazille first encountered Manet's Olympia. By the early 1870s, Bazille was living and working in Paris, where he painted two versions of the same Black woman arranging tulips, narcissi and irises. These paintings are thought to have originally been gifts for Bazille's sister-in-law Suzanne.

During the late 19th century, Paris experienced an influx of immigrants from across Europe and France's colonies. Unlike the controversial depiction of Black models in American art, which was often tied to issues of slavery, Black models in French art did not carry the same social stigma, but they were still often regarded as being from a lower social strata. As the Black population in Paris grew, their representation in art did, too. Bazille's studio, seen in his painting Bazille's Studio, was located on the Rue da La Condamine in the Batignolles District, a socially and racially diverse area of Paris. In this series of paintings, Bazille modernizes the portrayal of the Parisian working class, marking a shift towards representing all demographics of city life in art at the time. The woman in Bazille's paintings is depicted conducting a mundane task in a way that does not exoticize her; whether a housekeeper or a florist, her occupation is left to the viewer's imagination.

== Composition and analysis ==
The two paintings share many features, including the same model, though their compositions differ. In the painting in Washington, the woman holds a bundle of flowers in her right hand, with the rest of the flowers located on the tray, and she is making direct eye contact with the viewer. In contrast, in the Montpellier painting, the woman is arranging the bouquet in an ornamental vase, with her focus seemingly fully occupied with her task. The irises in this version bloom late in the spring, and since the peonies are more fully opened, it is thought that this version was painted after the painting located in Washington. Peonies, considered exotic and fragile, were not native to France, making them a challenging subject for painters at the time.

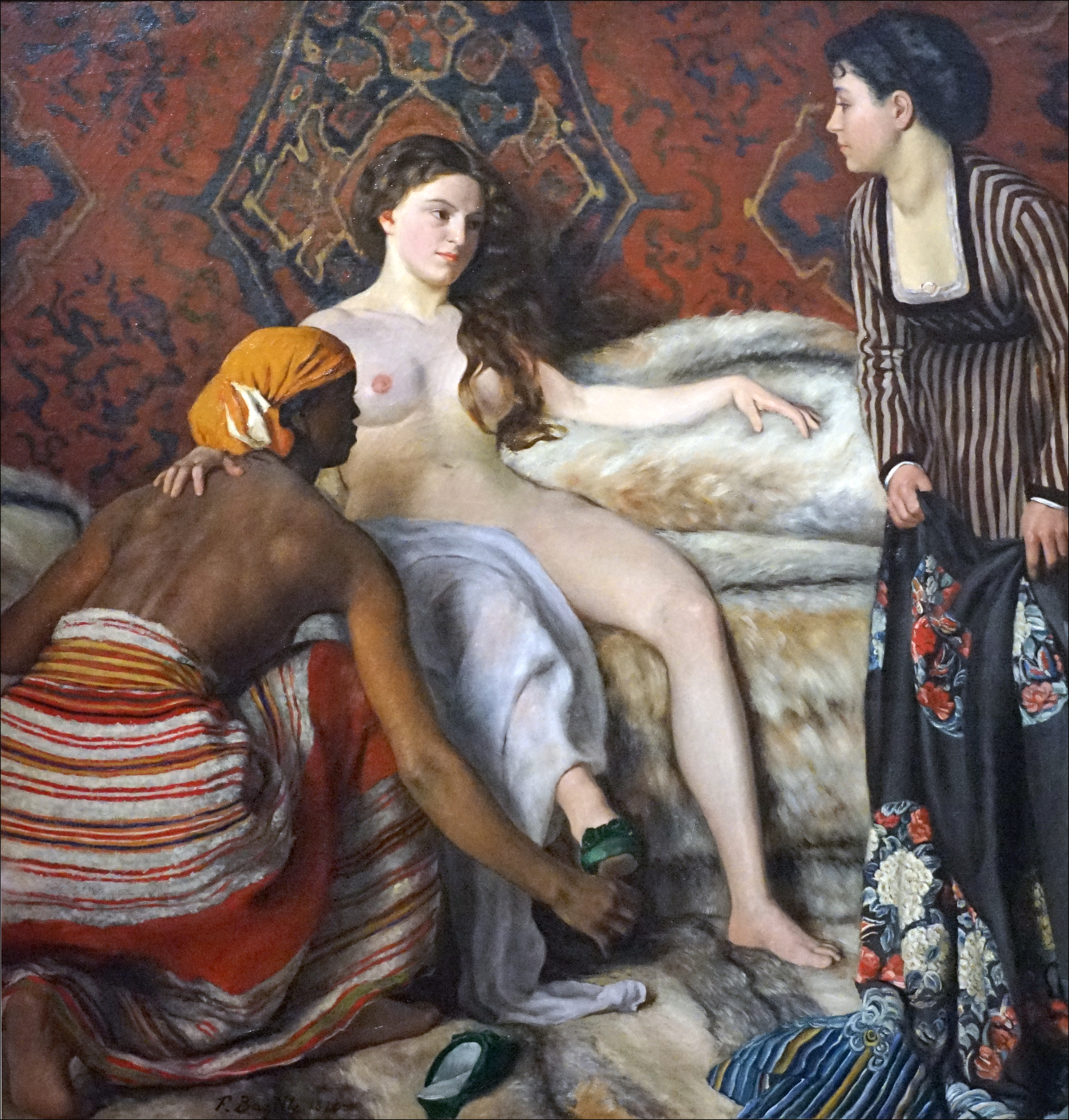
La Toilette by Frédéric Bazille (1869-1870) located at Musée Fabre

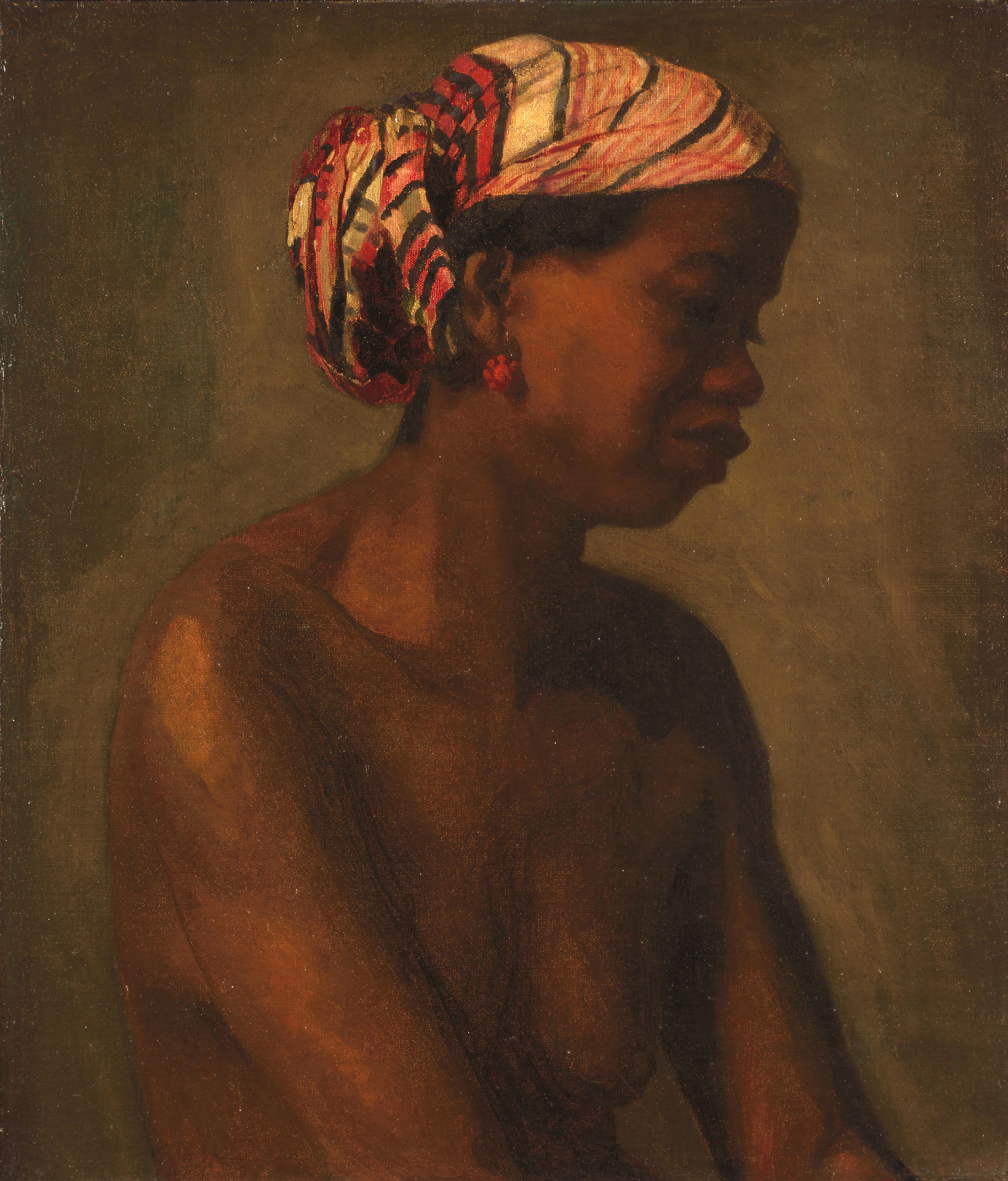
Female Model by Thomas Eakin (1868) located at the Fine Arts Museums of San Francisco

The female model is believed to be a friend of Bazille and may have been the same model that posed for Bazille's La Toilette in 1869-1870. She also wears an identical printed headscarf to the woman from Thomas Eakin's study Female Model, which he painted as a student studying in Paris in 1868.

In the context of 19th-century art, depicting women arranging flowers was traditionally linked to femininity and often portrayed as a private, intimate act. However, Bazille subverts these allegorical associations by presenting the woman’s expression as neutral and somber. The art historian Denise Murrell has suggested, however, that Bazille may "re-Orientalize" the woman through the juxtaposition with flowers, linking her with earth, nature, and the primitive.

== Influences ==
Upon moving to Paris in the 1860s, Bazille quickly befriended other Impressionist artists including Claude Monet, Pierre- Auguste Renoir, Alfred Sisley, and Manet. Bazille wrote in a letter to his father that "Manet made me myself." Bazille shared his studio on Rue de La Condamine with Renoir, the space seen in his painting Bazille's Studio.

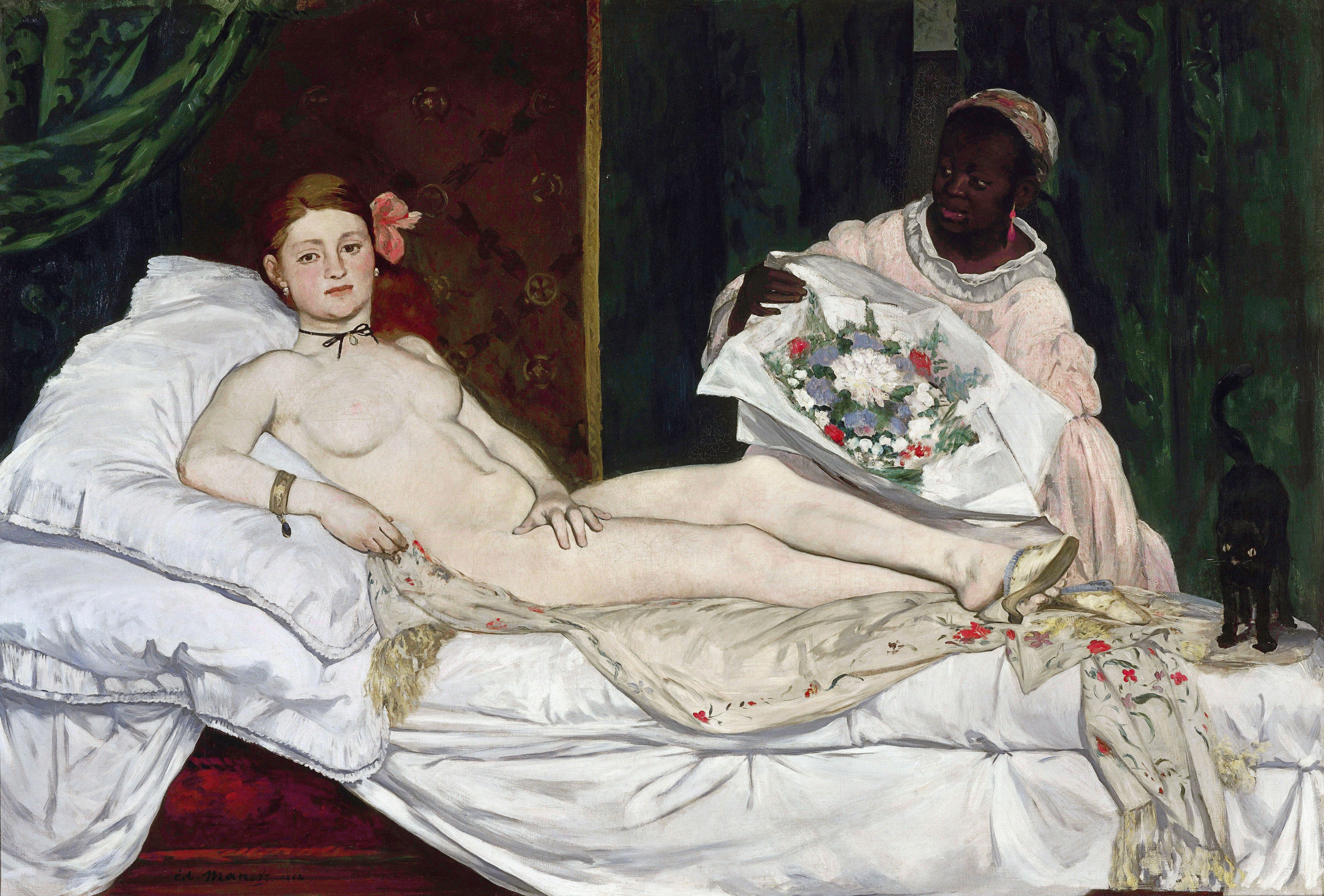
Olympia by Éduardo Manet located at the Musée d'Orsay, Paris

Black Woman with Peonies shares many similarities with Manet's depiction of Laure, the Black woman featured in Manet's earlier work Olympia. Bazille's two paintings are often cited as a homage to his close friend. All three paintings feature a Black woman holding flowers, wearing a headscarf and in a dress that was common attire for a Black working-class woman. The use of vibrant colors and the careful way in which Bazille emphasized the details of his model and the flowers set his work apart from the more muted and subdued colors that Manet uses. According to the art historian Dianne Pitman, Bazille’s approach to the subject of the Black woman may be seen as a more respectful and individualized portrayal compared to the more symbolic representation of a Black working-class woman in Manet’s work.

== See also ==
- List of paintings by Frédéric Bazille
