= Denise Murrell =

American curator

Denise Murrell is a curator at large for 19th- and 20th-century art at the Metropolitan Museum of Art in New York City. She is best known for her 2018 exhibition Posing Modernity: The Black Model from Manet and Matisse to Today, which explored how French Impressionist painters and later artists portrayed black models.

In 2019, the New York Observer included her on its "Arts Power 50" list of "individuals working to strengthen the impact, reach, social responsibility or financial stability of the arts industry".

== Early life and education ==
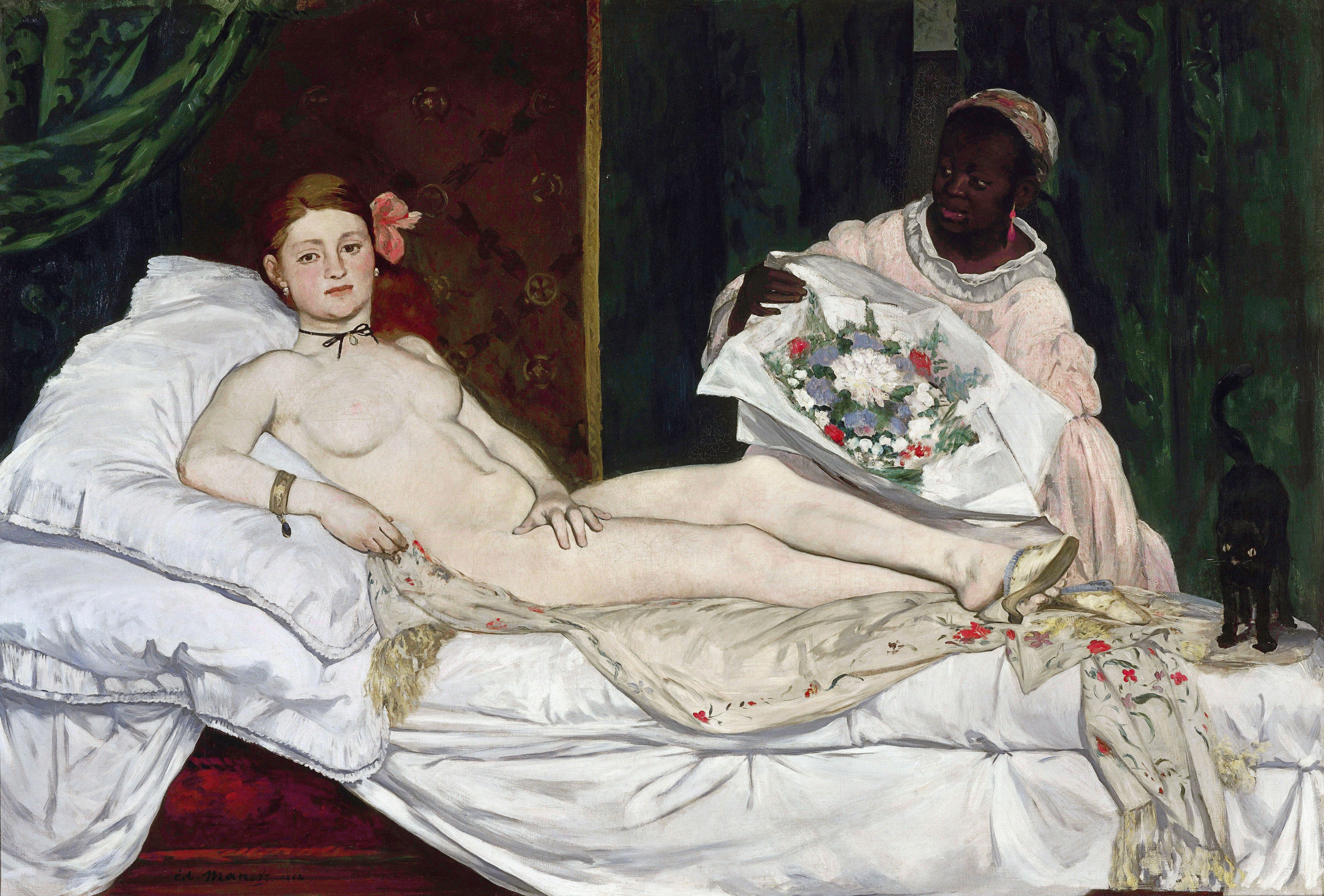
Murrell's early research focused on the portrayal of the black model in Olympia (Édouard Manet, 1863, Musée d'Orsay) and other Impressionist works.

Murrell spent her teenage years in Gastonia, North Carolina. At the time, she aspired to become a history professor.

Murrell earned her M.B.A. from Harvard Business School in 1980. She was one of only 30 black students in her class and one of less than ten women. Murrell began her career in business and finance at Citicorp bank and Institutional Investor publishing group. In 1997, she became the managing director for the Institutional Investor's Research Products Group.

While still working in business, Murrell began to take classes in art history at Hunter College and earned a Master's as well as PhD in the subject at Columbia University. During her classes, she was often surprised by the way her professors failed to discuss black figures in famous works such as Édouard Manet's 1863 painting Olympia, and the experience drove her to learn more about the African diaspora in Western art.

== Posing Modernity exhibition ==
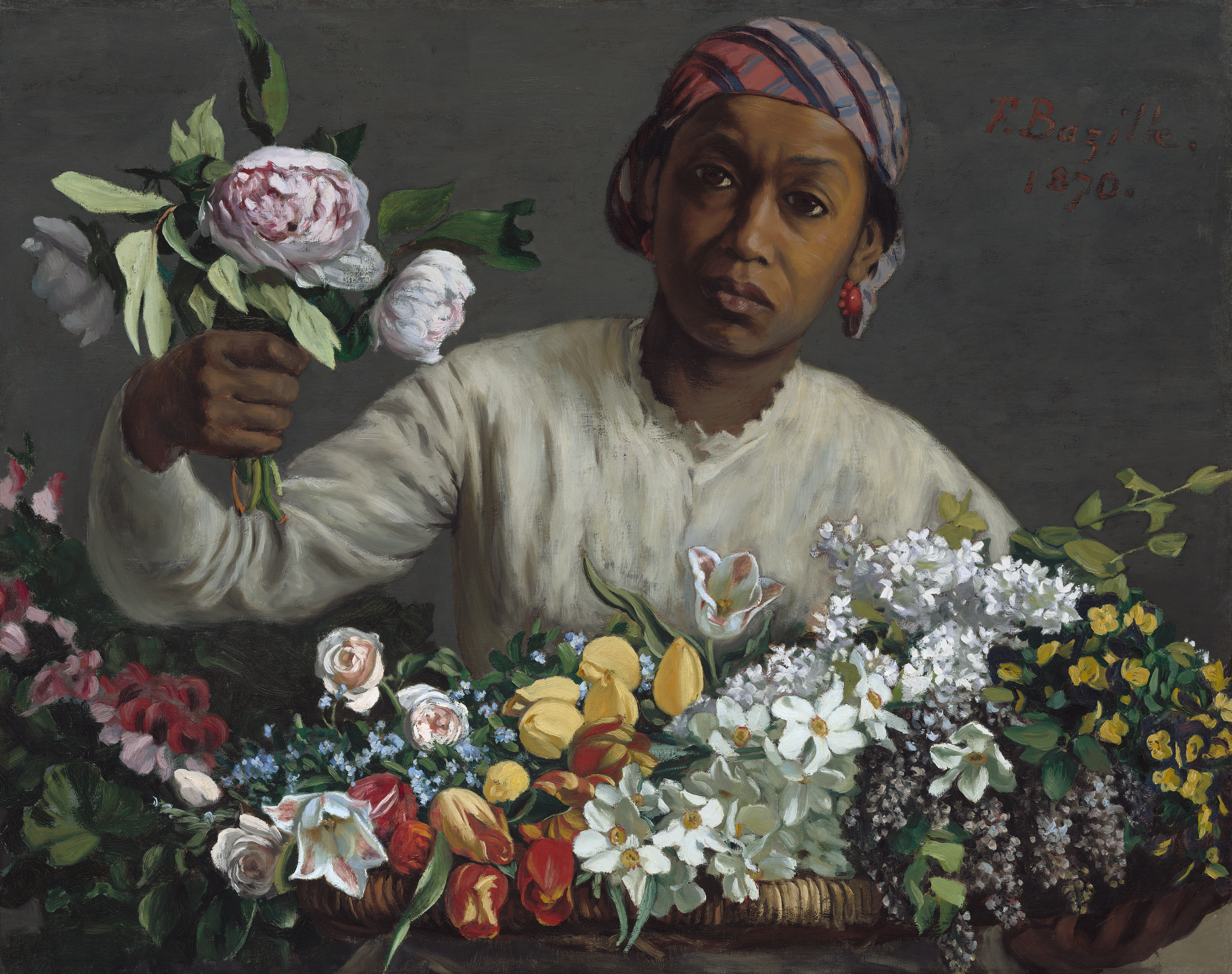
Young Woman with Peonies (Frédéric Bazille, 1870, National Gallery of Art) was one work featured in the Posing Modernity exhibition.

After receiving her PhD, Murrell initially had difficulty securing a position. Finally, she gained her first position in the field writing and giving gallery talks at the Metropolitan Museum of Art in New York City. She began specializing in several areas, including African American and diasporan art, Henri Matisse, the School of Paris, Édouard Manet, and Impressionism. After Ford Foundation president Darren Walker read her dissertation, the foundation awarded Murrell a $100,000 postdoctoral research fellowship in 2014 to carry out her work.

The research led to her first exhibition, staged at the Wallach Art Gallery at Columbia University, called Posing Modernity: The Black Model from Manet and Matisse to Today. The show was built around the maid of Manet's Olympia, a model named Laure, who had often been overlooked by art critics and historians. The exhibition also included works such as Miss La La at the Cirque Fernando by Edgar Degas, Frédéric Bazille’s Young Woman with Peonies, the Harlem paintings of Matisse, and responses to Olympia by black artists such as Romare Bearden's Patchwork Quilt.

The exhibition was then brought to the Musée d’Orsay in Paris, France, where it was exhibited under the title Black Models: From Géricault to Matisse (French: Le Modèle noir, de Géricault à Matisse). The show was described by a Wall Street Journal critic as "groundbreaking", and it drew rave reviews. As a companion piece to the exhibition, American conceptual artist Glenn Ligon created a commissioned installation for the Musée d’Orsay titled Some Black Parisians, in which the formerly forgotten names of these black models are displayed with neon lights.

Murrell also authored a companion book to the exhibits, identically titled to Columbia's exhibition. Art critic Roberta Smith of the New York Times named it one of the top art books of 2018, writing that its "new ideas and approaches change everything" in the way art historians consider the French Impressionists.

Following the exhibition, the New York Observer included Murrell on its "Arts Power 50" list of "individuals working to strengthen the impact, reach, social responsibility or financial stability of the arts industry". In Murrell's listing, the author joked that Murrell was "probably the first business executive turned curator whose doctoral thesis became a blockbuster exhibition".

== Metropolitan Museum of Art ==
In 2020, Murrell joined the Metropolitan Museum of Art (referred to colloquially as "the Met") as an associate curator. The New York Times reported on her hiring as "noteworthy" given the traditional lack of curators of color at the museum, and a sign of a change in philosophy under the Met's new director Max Hollein. Murrell stated that the Met was moving toward "a reconsideration of the West that moves away from an exclusively European culture; a deeper presentation of artists of color and a greater breadth of images depicting people of color".

By 2023, she had become a curator at large. That year, the Met announced that Murrell was curating a large exhibition on the Harlem Renaissance that will run from February 25, 2024 through July 28, 2024, and include work by painter William H. Johnson, photographer James Van Der Zee, and sculptor Augusta Savage. The Harlem Renaissance and Transatlantic Modernism includes 160 works framing the Harlem Renaissance as the “first African American-led movement of international Modern art” and is created in partnership with historically black universities such as Clark Atlanta, Howard, Hampton, and Fisk.
