= The See-Saw =

The See-Saw may refer to one of two paintings by Jean-Honoré Fragonard:

- The See-Saw (Fragonard, Louvre)
- The See-Saw (Fragonard, Madrid)
