= Portrait of Édouard Blau =

Painting by Frédéric Bazille

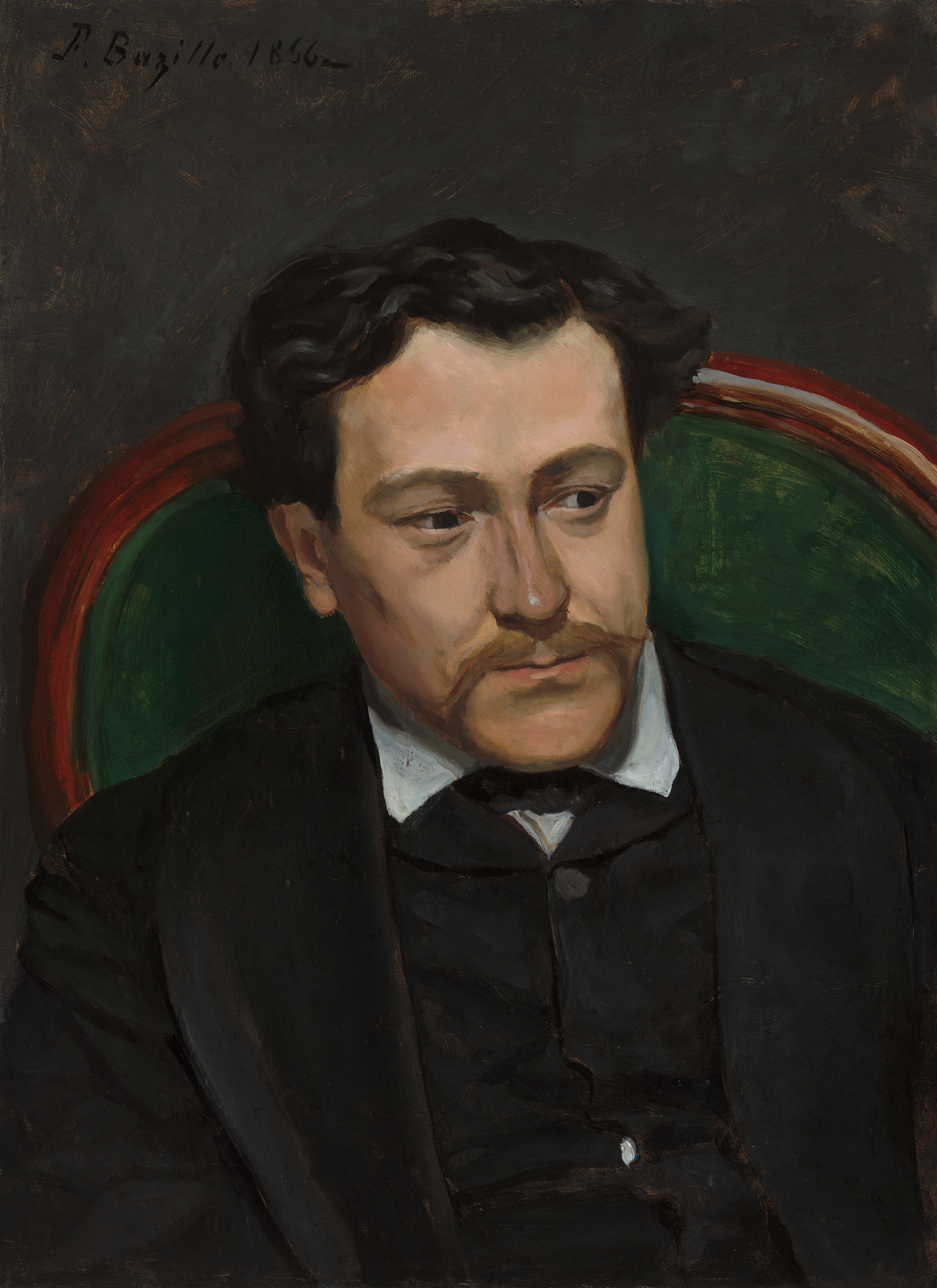
- Artist: Frédéric Bazille
- Year: 1866
- Medium: oil on canvas
- Dimensions: 59.5 cm × 43.2 cm (23.4 in × 17.0 in)
- Location: National Gallery of Art, Washington DC

Portrait of Édouard Blau is an oil-on-canvas painting executed in 1866 by the French painter Frédéric Bazille. The work depicts the French writer and librettist Édouard Blau.

== Artist ==
Frédéric Bazille was a French painter associated with the group of artists who later became known as the Impressionists. His work combines elements of academic training with early developments in modern art. His career was cut short by his death in 1870.

== Subject ==
The sitter, Édouard Blau, was a French dramatist, critic, and librettist active in the 19th century. He contributed to French opera and theatre and was part of the cultural milieu of Paris.

== Location ==
The painting is held in the collection of the National Gallery of Art, Washington, D.C., United States. It forms part of the Chester Dale Collection and is catalogued under accession number 1963.10.81.

== See also ==
- List of paintings by Frédéric Bazille
