= The Beach at Honfleur =

Oil-on-canvas painting (1864) by Claude Monet

- French: Le Bord de la Mer à Honfleur
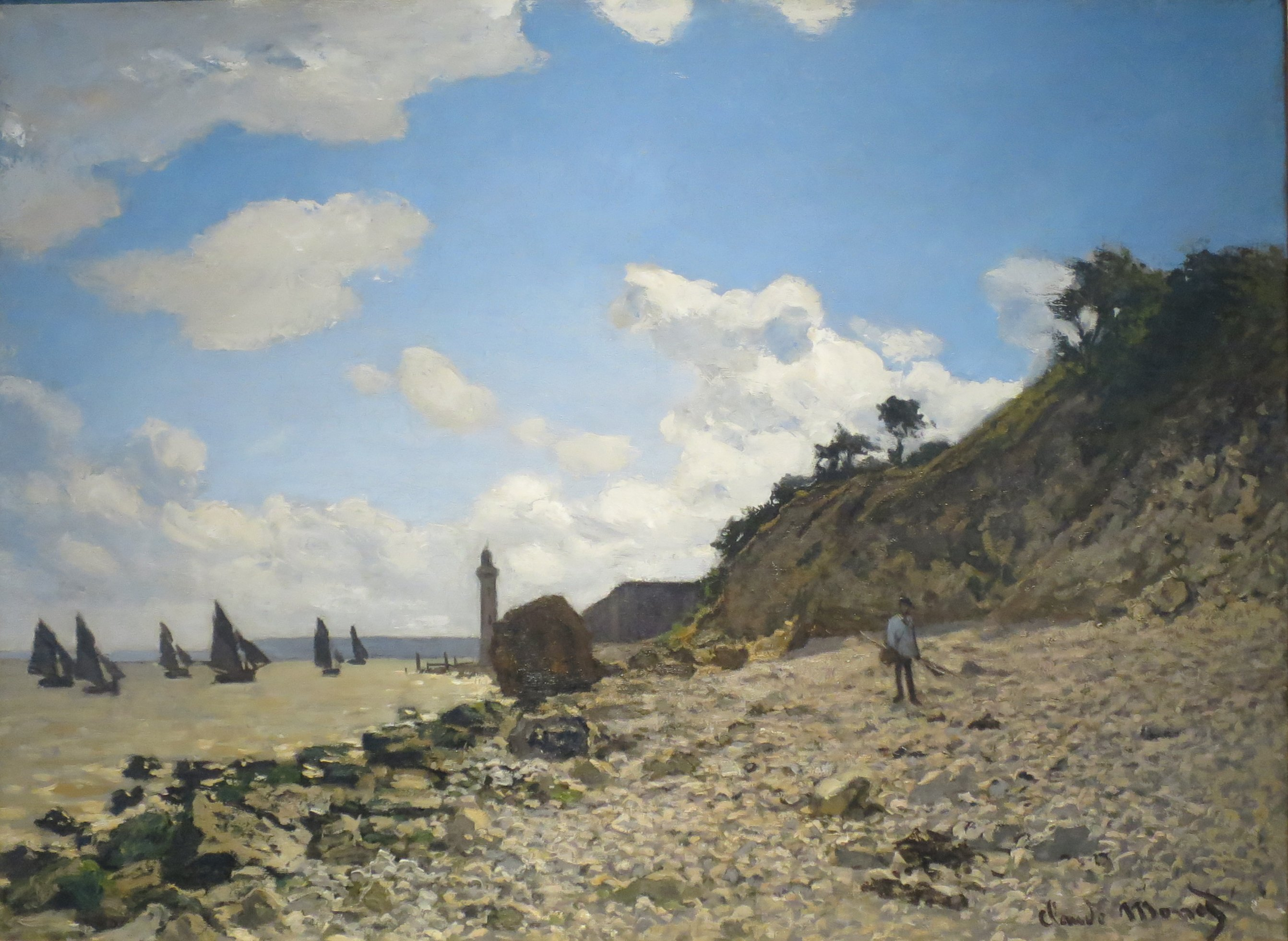
- Artist: Claude Monet
- Year: 1864
- Medium: Oil on canvas
- Dimensions: 60 cm × 81 cm (24 in × 32 in)
- Location: Los Angeles County Museum of Art, Los Angeles, California
- 34.062895°N 118.357837°W
- Website: collections.lacma.org/node/233916

The Beach at Honfleur is an oil-on-canvas painting by French impressionist Claude Monet. The painting depicts a beach on the Côte de Grâce with sailboats, the hospital of Honfleur, and a lighthouse in the distance. In the foreground, a solitary figure in a blue smock stands on the beach. The painting was created with short, thick brushstrokes, typical of Impressionism.

Monet painted The Beach at Honfleur in the summer of 1864, when he and Frédéric Bazille were staying at nearby Sainte-Adresse, where Monet's parents kept a summer house. Monet painted several scenes of the harbor, jetty, and town of Honfleur during this time period, including A Cart on the Snowy Road at Honfleur.

A painting reminiscent of The Beach at Honfleur is depicted in Studio on Rue Furstenberg (1866) by Bazille. Monet and Bazille shared this studio in Paris from 1864 to 1866.

== See also ==
- List of paintings by Claude Monet
