= List of paintings by Frédéric Bazille =

This is an incomplete list of the paintings by the French Impressionist artist Frédéric Bazille. In his brief career (he was killed at the age of 28 in the Franco-Prussian War) he produced some 70 canvasses.

| Image | Name | Year | Dimensions (cm) | Current Location | Ref |
|---|---|---|---|---|---|
| | Study of Trees | 1863 | | | |
| | Chailly - White Horse Inn | 1863 | | | |
| | Study of Saint-Sauveur | 1863 | 79 x 118 | private collection | |
| | The Pink Dress | 1864 | 147 x 110 | Musée d'Orsay, Paris | |
| | Au jardin | 1864 | | | |
| | Rita the Dog Sleeping | 1864 | | | |
| | Reclining Nude | 1864 | | Musée Fabre, Montpellier | |
| | Nude Woman from the Back | 1864 | | | |
| | Soup Bowl Covers | 1864 | | Musée Fabre, Montpellier | |
| | Saint-Sauveur | 1865 | | | |
| | The Improvised Field Hospital | 1865 | 48 x 65 | Musée d'Orsay, Paris | |
| | Studio on Rue Furstenberg | 1865 | | Musée Fabre, Montpellier | |
| | Forest of Fontainebleau | 1865 | 60 x 73.2 | Musée d'Orsay, Paris | |
| | Chailly | 1865 | | | |
| | Landscape at Chailly | 1865 | | Art Institute of Chicago | |
| | Self-portrait | 1865–66 | 108.9 × 71.1 | Art Institute of Chicago | |
| | Portrait of Édouard Blau | 1866 | 59.5 x 43.2 | National Gallery of Art, Washington DC | |
| | Still life with Fish | 1866 | 63.5 x 81.9 | Detroit Institute of Arts | |
| | Young Italian Girl Street Singer | 1866 | | Musée Fabre, Montpellier | |
| | The Little Gardener | c.1866–67 | 168.9 x 128 | Museum of Fine Arts, Houston | |
| | Young Girl at the Piano | 1866–67 | 40.5 x 32 | Private collection | |
| | Family Reunion | 1867 | 152 x 230 | Musée d'Orsay, Paris | |
| | Landscape of Aigues-Mortes | 1867 | 46 x 55 | Musée Fabre, Montpellier | |
| | Western Ramparts of Aigues-Mortes | 1867 | 60 x 100 | National Gallery of Art, Washington D.C. | |
| | Queen's Gate at Aigues-Mortes | 1867 | 60 x 100 | Metropolitan Museum of Art | |
| | Portrait of Pierre‑Auguste Renoir | 1867 | 62 x 51 | Musée d'Orsay, Paris | |
| | Studio of The Rue Visconti | 1867 | 64.77 x 48.26 | Virginia Museum of Fine Arts, Richmond, Virginia | |
| | The Heron | 1867 | 97.5 x 78 | Private collection | |
| | The Terrace at Méric | 1867 | 97 x 128 | Musée du Petit Palais, Geneva | |
| | The Terrace at Méric (Oleander) | 1867 | 55.2 x 91.4 | Cincinnati Art Museum, Ohio | |
| | Thérèse reading in the Park at Méric | 1867 | 92 x 59.2 | Private collection | |
| | Portrait of Paul Verlaine | 1867 | 57.2 x 45.1 | Private collection | |
| | Self-Portrait | 1867–68 | 54.6 x 46.4 | Minneapolis Institute of Art | |
| | Paul Verlaine as a Troubadour | 1868 | 45.8 x 38.1 | Dallas Museum of Art | |
| | Flowers | 1868 | 130 x 95 | | |
| | Portrait of Alphonse Tissie | 1868 | | | |
| | Self-Portrait at Saint-Sauveur | 1868 | | Musée Fabre, Montpellier | |
| | The Fisherman with a Net | 1868 | 134 x 83 | | |
| | View of the Village | 1868 | 130 x 89 | Musée Fabre, Montpellier | |
| | Portrait of a Woman | 1868 | 41 x 33 | | |
| | Bathers (Summer Scene) | 1869 | 160 × 160.7 | Fogg Museum (Harvard Art Museums), Cambridge, Massachusetts | |
| | Portrait of Edmond Maitre | 1869 | 83 x 64.2 | National Gallery of Art, Washington DC | |
| | The Fortune Teller | c.1869 | | | |
| | Woman in Moorish Costume | 1869 | | Norton Simon Museum, Pasadena, California | |
| | Young Woman with Lowered Eyes | 1869 | | | |
| | After the Bath | 1870 | | Private collection | |
| | Naked Young Man Sleeping on the Grass | 1870 | | Musée Fabre, Montpellier | |
| | Ruth et Booz | 1870 | 138 x 202 | Musée Fabre, Montpellier | |
| | Fleurs | c.1870 | | Deji Art Museum, Nanjing | |
| | Landscape on the Shore of Lez | 1870 | | Minneapolis Institute of Art | |
| | Louis Auriol Fishing | 1870 | | Private collection | |
| | Black Woman with Peonies | 1870 | 60.3 x 75.2 | Musée Fabre, Montpellier, France | |
| | Young Woman with Peonies | 1870 | 60 x 75 | National Gallery of Art, Washington D.C. | |
| | The Artist's Studio, Rue de la Condamine | 1870 | | Musée d'Orsay, Paris | |
| | La Toilette | 1870 | 132 x 127 | Musée Fabre, Montpellier | |
| | Dried Fish (Two Herrings) | ? | | Musée Fabre, Montpellier | |
| | Man with a Pipe | ? | | | |
| | Self-portrait | ? | | Private collection | |
| | Jeune Femme au jardin | 1869 | 76 × 42.5 | Private collection | |
