= Femme en costume Mauresque =

Painting by Frédéric Bazille

- Woman in Moorish Costume
- Femme en costume Mauresque
- Artist: Frédéric Bazille
- Year: 1869
- Medium: Oil on canvas
- Movement: Impressionism
- Subject: portrait
- Dimensions: 99.7 cm × 59 cm (39.3 in × 23 in)
- Location: Norton Simon Museum, Pasadena
- Accession: M.1997.2.P

Femme en costume Mauresque is an oil-on-canvas painting by the 19th-century French impressionist artist Frédéric Bazille, completed in 1869. It has been in the collection of the Norton Simon Museum in Pasadena, California, since 1997.

== Overview ==
This painting is an example of Bazille's interest in Orientalism. The model is Lise Tréhot, the mistress and model of Bazille's friend Renoir, who appears in more than twenty paintings by Renoir during his early Salon period from approximately 1866 until 1872. She would later model for Bazille again in his 1870 La Toilette. At the time the painting was executed, Bazille and Renoir shared a Paris studio in rue de la Condamine.

In this work, she is depicted with eroticism, dressed in North African costume, wearing only a white, translucent chemise underneath a colorful open robe. Her eyes are looking down as she appears to be attempting to either tie or untie a knot. The saber and striped kaftan on the wall behind her suggest a male presence, and the empty brass tray on the floor allude to refreshments which she may have served.

In the year following the completion of this painting, the Franco-Prussian War erupted and Bazille volunteered for service in a Zouave regiment in August 1870 and was sent to French North Africa for training. This was the first time he had visited Algeria, so his imagery in Femme en costume mauresque was based on stereotyped odalisques in harems as portrayed by Eugène Delacroix, Jean-Léon Gérôme, Jean-Auguste-Dominique Ingres and others, rather on any direct experience. On November 28, 1870, he was with his unit at the Battle of Beaune-la-Rolande when, his commanding officer having been injured, he took command and led an assault on the Prussian positions. He was hit twice in the failed attack and was killed in action at the age of twenty-eight.

== See also ==
- List of paintings by Frédéric Bazille
