= Young Girl at the Piano =

1866 painting by Frédéric Bazille

- Jeune fille au piano (French)
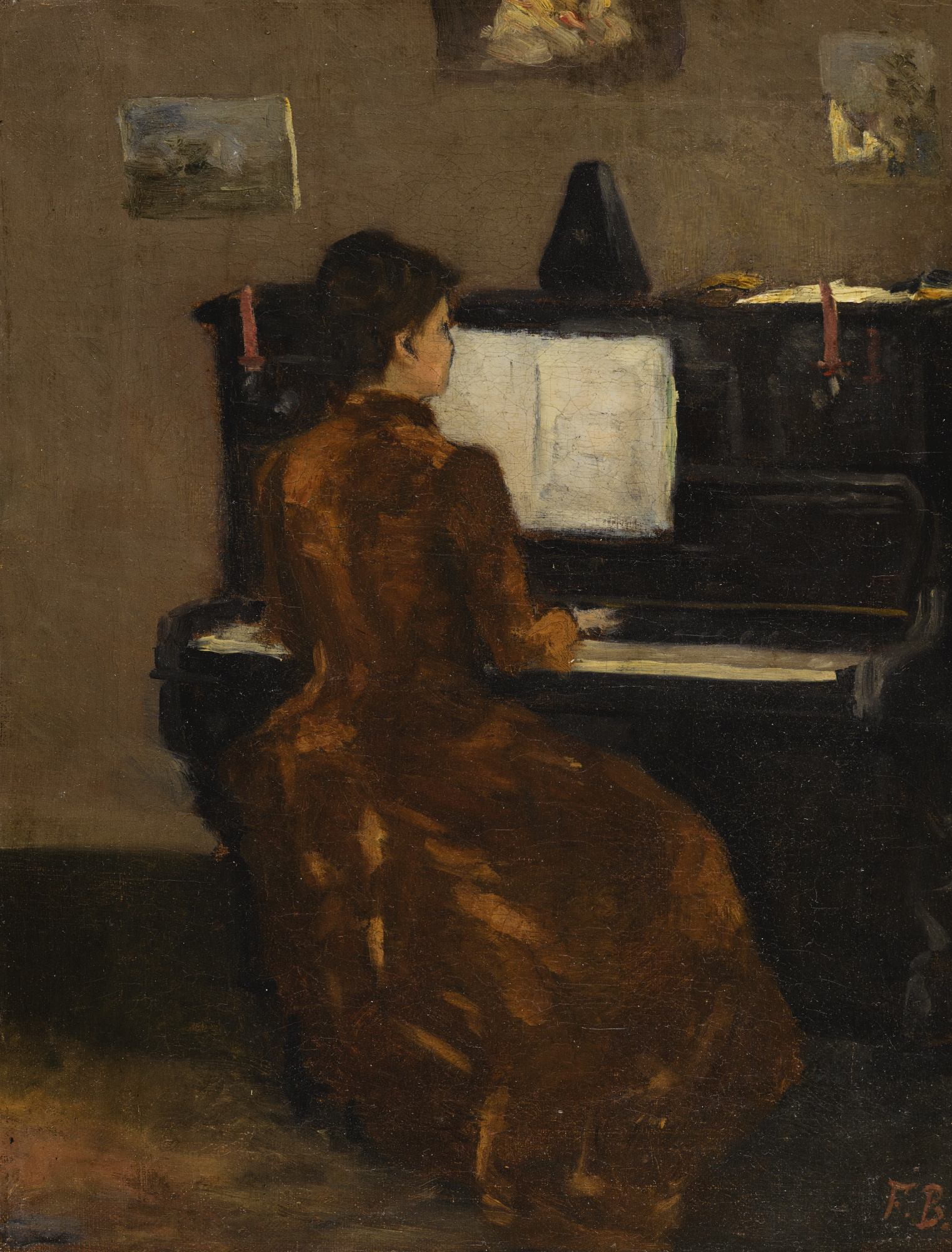
- Artist: Frédéric Bazille
- Year: 1866–67
- Medium: oil on canvas
- Dimensions: 40.5 cm × 32.5 cm (15.9 in × 12.8 in)
- Location: Private collection

Young Girl at the Piano (French: Jeune fille au piano) by Frédéric Bazille (1841–1870) is in a private collection and not part of a public museum's permanent holdings. The painting, an oil on canvas executed around 1866–1867, measures approximately 40.5 × 32.5 cm and is signed by the artist. It has remained in private hands through successive ownerships and was last recorded in a private collection after appearing on the art market (including a sale at auction).

== See also ==
- List of paintings by Frédéric Bazille
