= Studio on Rue Furstenberg =

Painting by Frédéric Bazille

Atelier de la rue Furstenberg
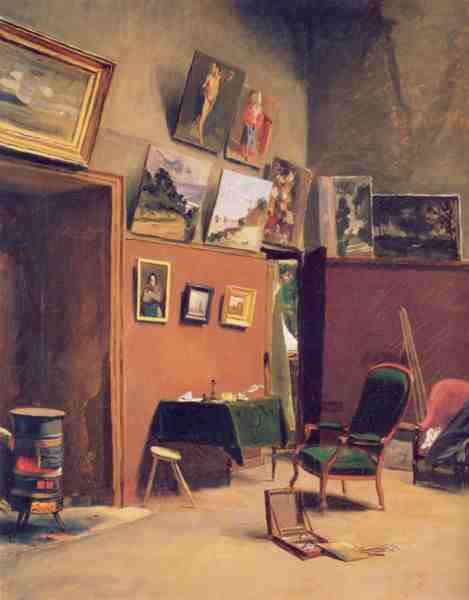
- Artist: Frédéric Bazille
- Year: 1866
- Medium: oil on canvas
- Dimensions: 80 cm × 65 cm (31 in × 26 in)
- Location: Musée Fabre, Montpellier

Atelier de la rue Furstenberg (Studio on Rue Furstenberg) is an 1866 oil-on-canvas painting by the 19th century French impressionist artist Frédéric Bazille, which has been in the collection of the Musée Fabre in Montpellier, France since 1985.

== Overview ==
Depictions of artist's studios was a popular genre of the early 19th century. This 1866 painting depicts the studio Bazille was sharing with Claude Monet at 6 Place de Furstenberg in the 6th arrondissement of Paris in January 1866. It was located near the center of Paris, on the Left Bank, near the Ecole des Beaux-Arts and within walking distance of the Louvre. After Bazille arrived in Paris in 1864, he initially had no studio of his own and had to borrow from a friend and lodge elsewhere. However, with financial support from his parents, he found a studio with two attached bedrooms which would allow him to save time and money by living and working at the same place. Monet was already familiar with the place having painted his Le Déjeuner sur l'herbe in the same studio in 1865.

Bazille's painting depicts a corner of the room, which is furnished with only two armchairs. A doorway in a back corner leads to one of the small bedrooms, through the window of which one catches a glimpse of the gray winter sky. A paintbox, palette and some brushes are on the floor and several paintings line the walls. No one appears in the studio, but the paintings hint at the inhabitants. The Portrait of Claude Monet by Gilbert Alexandre de Séverac hangs on the wall at left, just above a small table. One of the unframed paintings above is Monet's The Beach at Honfleur and another to the right of the doorway is his Road by Saint-Siméon Farm. Above the alcoves with the wood stove is either Bazille's Beach at Sainte-Adresse or Monet's Hevaux à la pointe de la Hève, both of which were painted in this studio. The Beach at Honfleur (1864) by Claude Monet (on the same wall, to the right); Road by Saint-Siméon Farm (1864) by Claude Monet (to the right of the door on the back wall).

From the window of this studio, Bazille and Monet could look across the courtyard of the same building to see a studio used by the Eugène Delacroix between 1857 and his death in 1863. Delacroix had moved to Rue Fursenberg to be close to the Église Saint-Sulpice, where he was painting a chapel. That studio was later used by Diogène Maillart, Delacroix's student, whilst working to win the first prize for painting in 1864. Both Bazille and Monet were great admirers of Delacroix, and they may have been attracted to the 6 Place de Furstenberg address because of this connection. Bazille was also probably aware of Delacroix's Studio Corner with Stove, which was placed on sale upon Delacroix's death in 1864. The stove in Bazille's painting is on similar design and positioning, and have been intended as a homage to Delacroix as is the painting of flowers depicted over the doorway.

The building in which this studio was located is now the Musée national Eugène-Delacroix.

== See also ==
- List of paintings by Frédéric Bazille
