= The Kings' Tart =

1774 painting by Jean-Baptiste Greuze

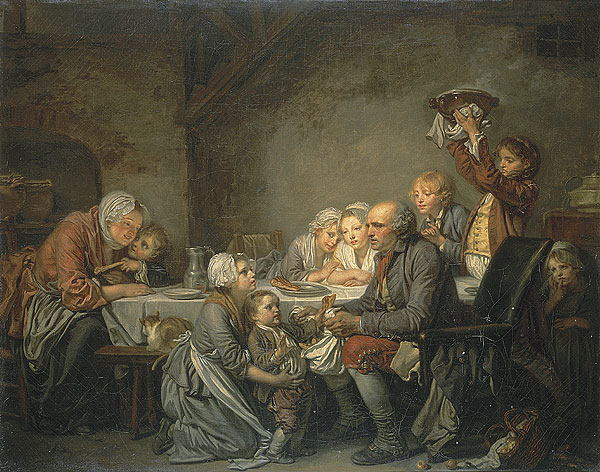
- Artist: Jean-Baptiste Greuze
- Year: 1774
- Type: Oil on canvas
- Dimensions: 71 cm × 92.5 cm (28 in × 36.4 in)
- Location: Musée Fabre; Montpellier

The Kings' Tart or The Twelfth Night Cake is a 1774 genre painting by Jean-Baptiste Greuze, showing the French tart then traditionally baked for Epiphany to celebrate the arrival of the Three Kings. Since 1836 it has been in the Musée Fabre, in Montpellier.
