= Portrait of Pierre‑Auguste Renoir =

Painting by Frédéric Bazille

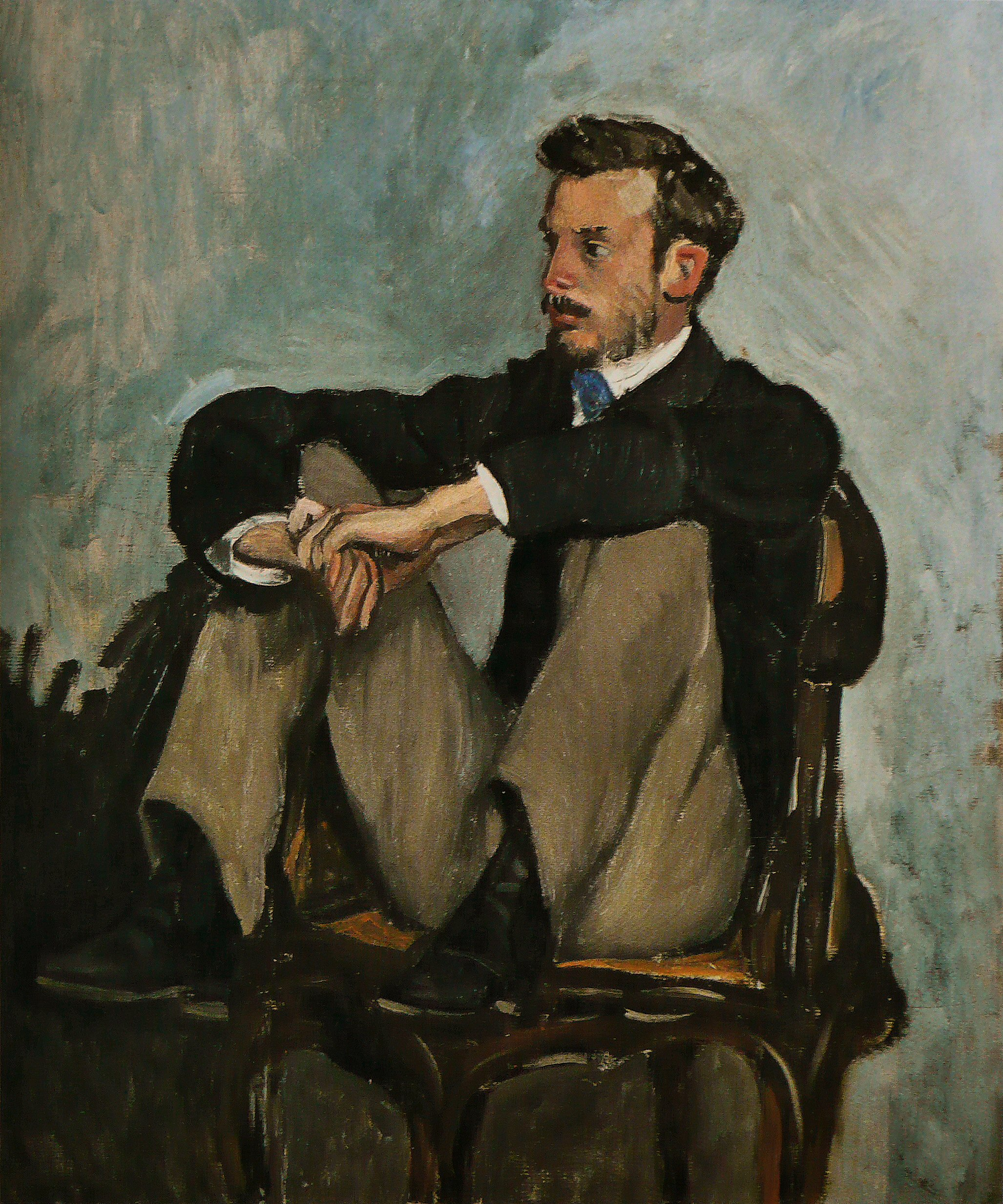
- Artist: Frédéric Bazille
- Year: 1867
- Medium: oil on canvas
- Dimensions: 62 cm × 51 cm (24 in × 20 in)
- Location: Musée d'Orsay, Paris

Portrait of Pierre‑Auguste Renoir is an oil on canvas portrait painted in 1867 by the French artist Frédéric Bazille (1841–1870). The work depicts the young French painter Pierre‑Auguste Renoir (1841–1919), who later became a key figure in the Impressionist movement. The painting measures approximately 62 × 51 cm and is associated with early Impressionism. It is held in the Musée d’Orsay in Paris, France.

== Description ==
Renoir is seated against a simple, muted background, wearing a dark jacket, trousers, and a blue cravat. His posture is relaxed, hands in his lap, with a calm expression. Bazille's visible brushwork emphasizes light and form without distracting from the figure.

== Provenance and location ==
The painting entered the collection of the Musée d’Orsay in Paris, where it is associated with the museum's holdings of 19th‑century art. In some catalogues it is also noted in relation to other early works by Bazille that document his relationship with fellow artists and his own artistic development.

== See also ==
- List of paintings by Frédéric Bazille
