= The Palette Game =

Painting by Jean-Honoré Fragornard

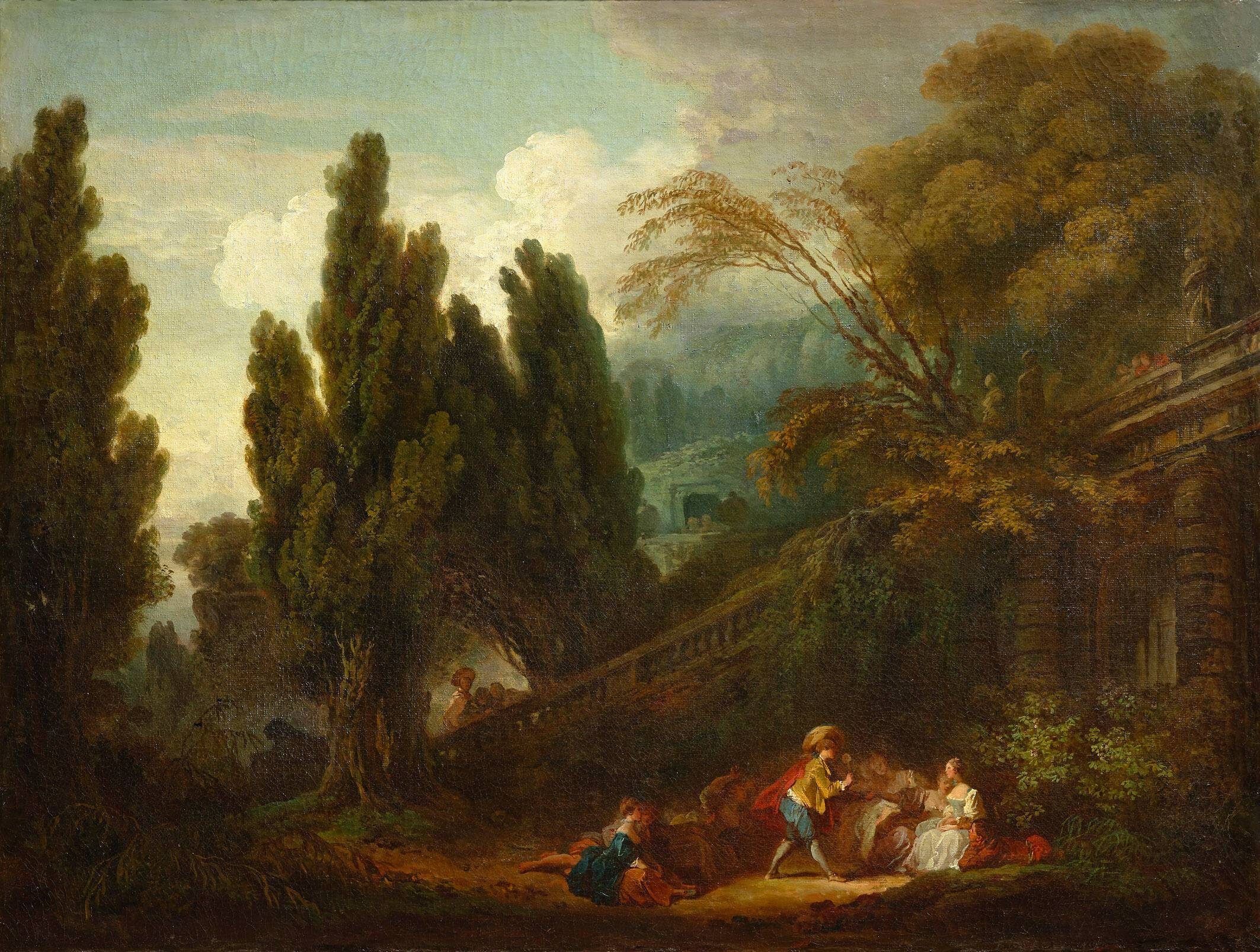
The Palette Game (c. 1761–1765) by Jean-Honoré Fragonard

The Palette Game (French: Le Jeu de la palette) is a c. 1761–1765 oil-on-canvas painting by Jean-Honoré Fragonard, showing an idyll with a happy company in a natural landscape dominated by ruins. It and The See-Saw were rediscovered in a château in Orne in 2016, after which they were both declared national treasures of France and then acquired for the Louvre, which placed them on long-term loan to the Musée Fabre in Montpellier in 2021.

== See also ==
- List of works by Fragonard
