= The Family Reunion (painting) =

Painting by Frédéric Bazille

- Portraits of the Family
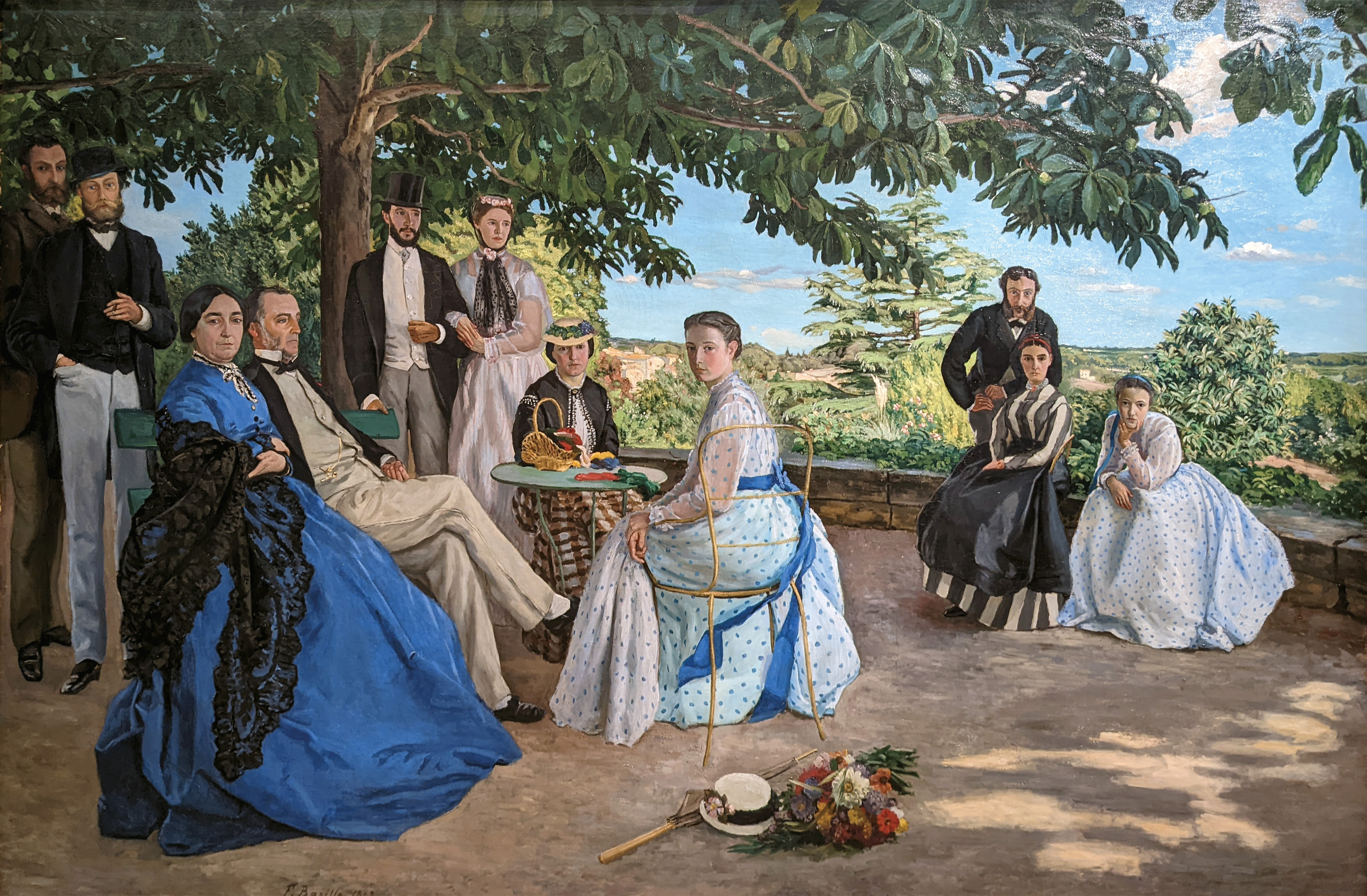
- Artist: Frédéric Bazille
- Year: 1867–68
- Medium: oil on canvas
- Dimensions: 152 cm × 230 cm (60 in × 91 in)
- Location: Musée d'Orsay; Paris

The Family Reunion or Portraits of the Family is an oil-on-canvas painting executed in 1867 by the French painter Frédéric Bazille. It is the largest surviving canvas (152 by 230 cm) by this artist. It is now in the collection of the Musée d'Orsay in Paris.

== Description ==
The painter took inspiration to create this painting from a meeting that took place at his residence in Méric, near Montpellier, in the summer of 1867. Under the shade of a large chestnut tree, on a sunny day, which enhances the variations between light and shade, Bazille represents his parents seated on a bench, on the left. On the terrace also depicted are his uncle Eugéne des Hours and wife, his cousin Pauline with her husband Émile Teulon, and his brother Marc with his wife Suzanne and another cousin, Camille, back from a walk. The author depiction of himself, at the far left, behind his seated parents, was only included in the composition later.

The women's dresses in light blue with navy blue dots represent a fashion of the Summer of 1867, and were considered an unmistakable sign of the 19th century bourgeoisie.

Regarding the pose of the figures, it can be noted that eight of the eleven people depicted look at the observer directly or indirectly but without any interaction between them. It is worth highlighting how Bazille generously manages to reflect his love for the light of Southern France.

Even so, the author was not completely satisfied and, after its presentation at the Salon, he touched up the work during the winter, exchanging some puppies for an unnatural still life.

In contrast with Claude Monet's picture Women in the Garden, which Bazille had recently bought from the artist, and in which the subjects are captured absorbed in their own activity, Bazille's subjects are all motionless, looking at the viewer, giving his work the stilted feel of a wedding photograph.

The painting was accepted for exhibition by the Salon of 1868 in preference to Monet's more daring compositions. It was acquired in 1905 by the State museums from the Bazille family.

== Reception ==
The then young writer Émile Zola was commissioned to write a review of the painting, in which he highlighted the painter's sensitivity when concerning the depiction of the natural light on the terrace, and also his attention to the clothing of the figures and his accuracy in portraying eleven people with all the details, poses and gestures characteristic of their own individual personalities. This causes each person to be presented in a similar way to a photograph.

== See also ==
- List of paintings by Frédéric Bazille
