= The See-Saw (Fragonard, Louvre) =

Painting by Jean-Honoré Fragonard

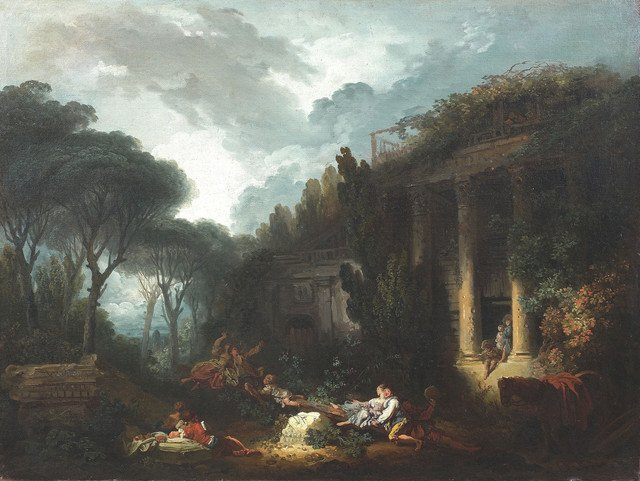
The See-Saw (c. 1761–1765) by Jean-Honoré Fragonard

The See-Saw is an oil painting on canvas of c. 1761–1765 by Jean-Honoré Fragonard. It and The Palette Game were rediscovered in a château in Orne in 2016, after which they were both declared national treasures of France and then acquired for the Louvre, which placed them on long-term loan to the Musée Fabre in Montpellier in 2021.

== See also ==
- List of works by Fragonard
