= La Toilette (Bazille) =

Painting by Frédéric Bazille

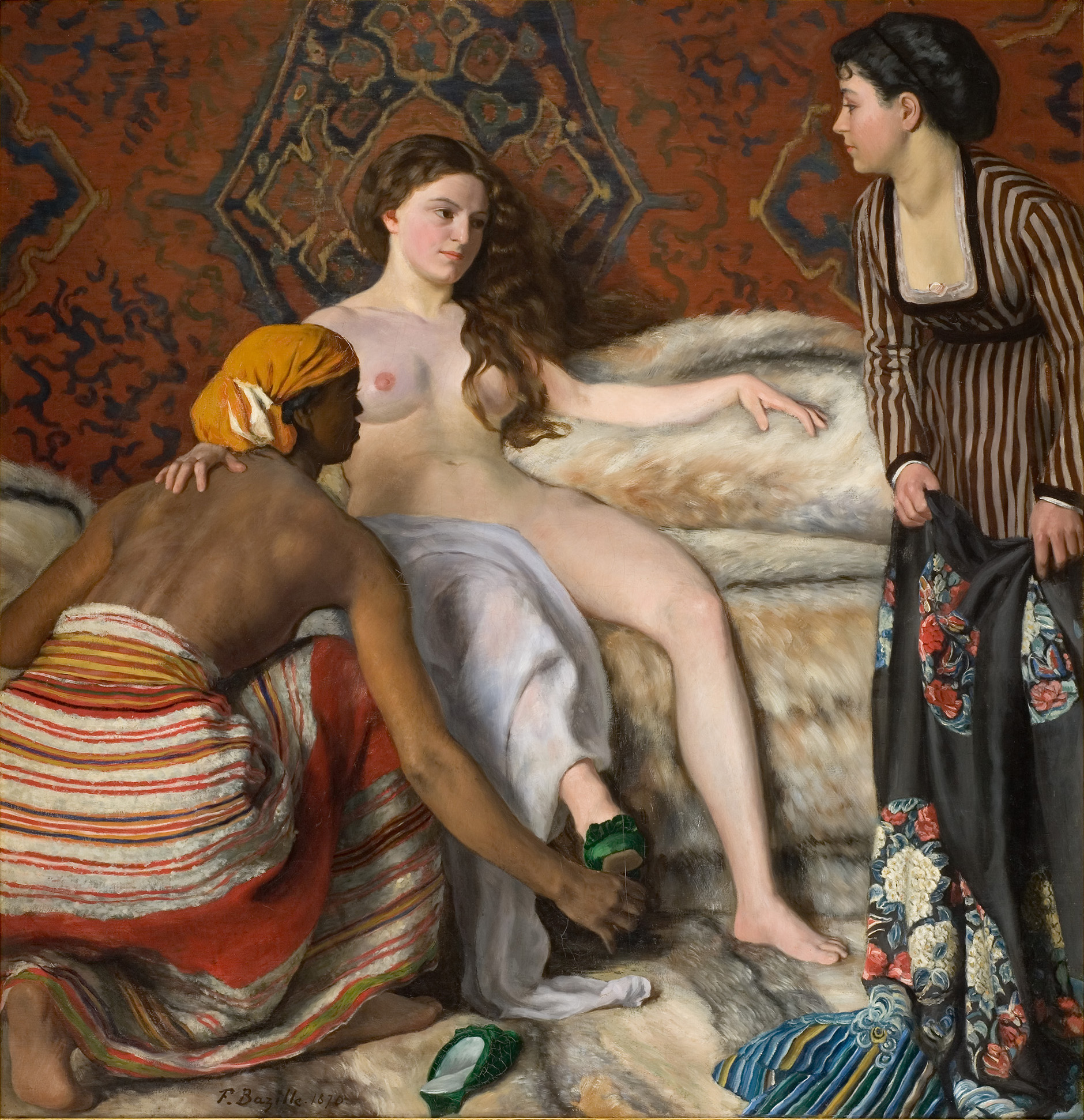
- Artist: Frédéric Bazille
- Year: 1869–1870
- Medium: Oil on canvas
- Dimensions: 153 cm × 143 cm (60 in × 56 in)
- Location: Musee Fabre, Montpellier
- Accession: 18.1.2

La Toilette is an oil-on-canvas painting by the 19th century French impressionist artist Frédéric Bazille, executed in 1869–1870, which has been in the collection of the Musée Fabre in Montpellier, France since 1968. He produced it a few months before his death in the Franco-Prussian War in 1870.

== Overview ==
Bazille began this painting in December 1869 with then intent of displaying it at the 1870 Paris Salon, the official art exhibition of the Académie des Beaux-Arts, which was arguably the greatest annual or biennial art event in the Western world. Acceptance at this exhibition would have ensured Bazille's career in the orthodoxy of French painting. He chose a rather conventional theme of a nude woman in her bath, presumably in a Turkish harem, as hinted at by the oriental rug on the wall in the background, and the oriental design on the dress being held by one of the two servant women—a theme which he felt would be received positively by the head judge of the exhibition, Jean-Léon Gérôme, a noted Orientalist painter. Bazille mentioned the painting in letters to his mother, telling her that he had located a "ravishing model" who was "ruinously expensive" and a "superb negress". The figure on the right, fully clothed in a modern striped dress, is believed to have been Lise Tréhot, a Paris model and mistress of Bazille's fellow artist and friend Renoir. She had previously modeled for Bazille for his Femme en costume Mauresque the previous year. At the time the painting was executed Bazille and Renoir shared a Paris studio in rue de la Condamine.

The work was completed in March 1870, and submitted for the Paris Salon along with a landscape. However, despite Bazille's hopes, the painting was rejected by the Paris Salon jury. Bazille subsequently never publicly exhibited the work.

In an unfinished condition the work can be seen on the wall of Bazille's studio in his 1870 painting Studio in Rue de La Condamine.

Less than half a year later, the Franco-Prussian War erupted and Bazille volunteered for service in a Zouave regiment in August 1870. On November 28 of the same year, he was with his unit at the Battle of Beaune-la-Rolande when, his commanding officer having been injured, he took command and led an assault on the Prussian positions. He was hit twice in the failed attack and was killed in action at the age of twenty-eight.

== See also ==
- List of paintings by Frédéric Bazille
