= Musée Fabre =

Museum in Montpellier, France

Coordinates: 43.612°N 3.880°E

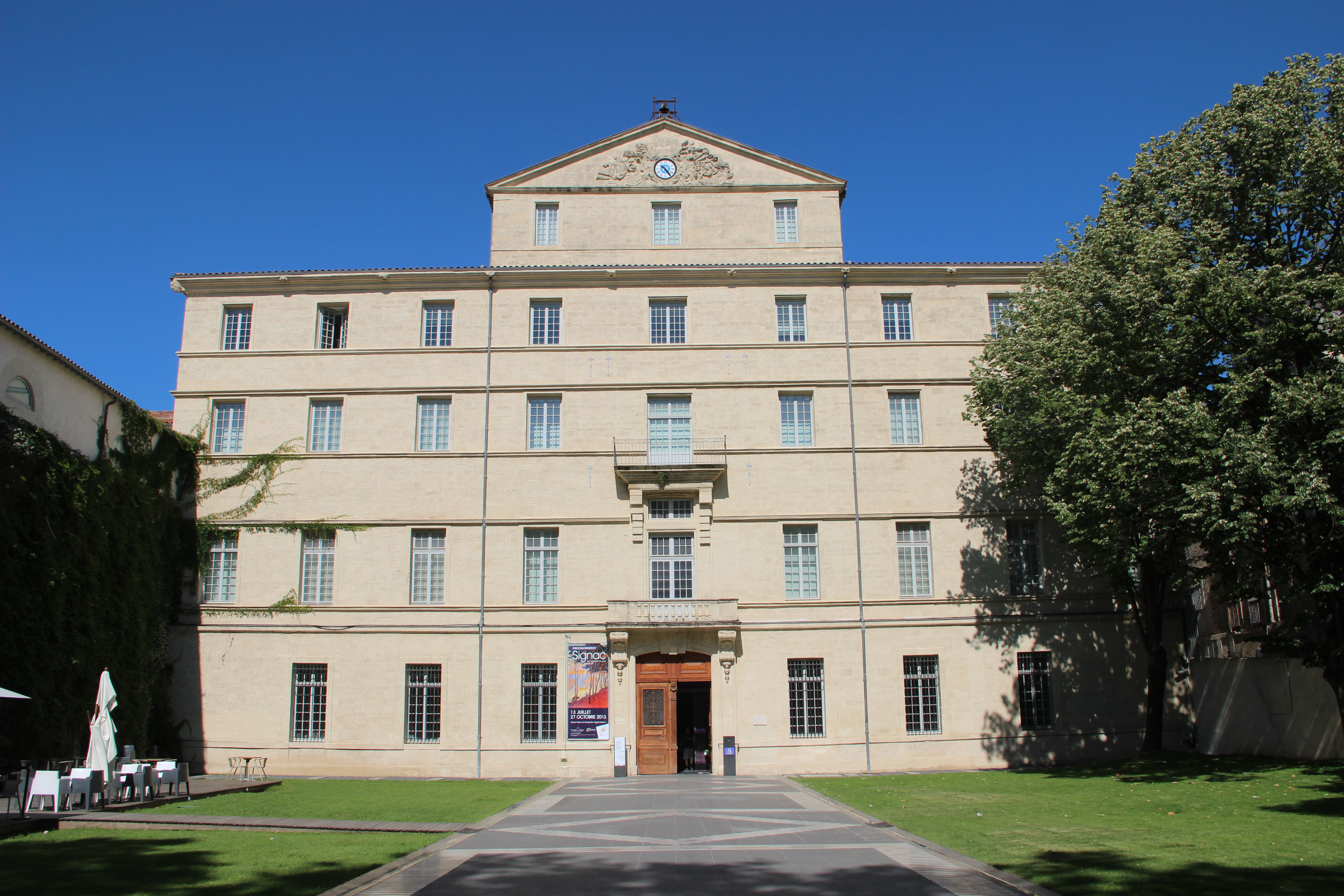
Musée Fabre

The Musée Fabre (French: [myze fabʁ]; Fabre Museum) is a museum in the southern French city of Montpellier, capital of the Hérault department.

The museum was founded by François-Xavier Fabre, a Montpellier painter, in 1825. Beginning in 2003, the museum underwent a 61.2 million euro renovation, which was completed in January 2007. It is one of the main sights of Montpellier and close to the city's main square, the Place de la Comédie. The museum's national importance is recognised by it being classified as a Musée de France by the Ministry of Culture.

== History ==
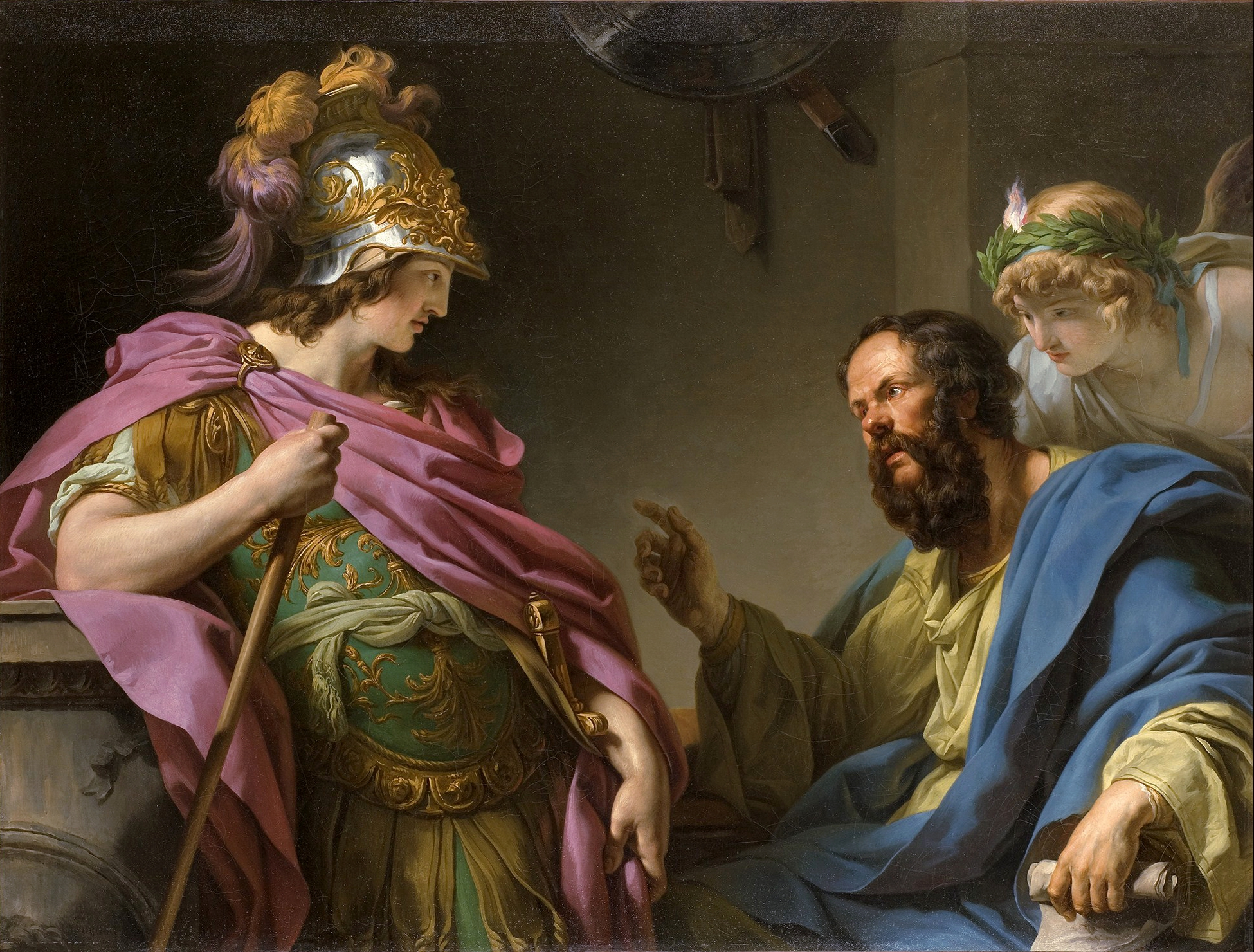
Alcibiades Being Taught by Socrates, by François-André Vincent

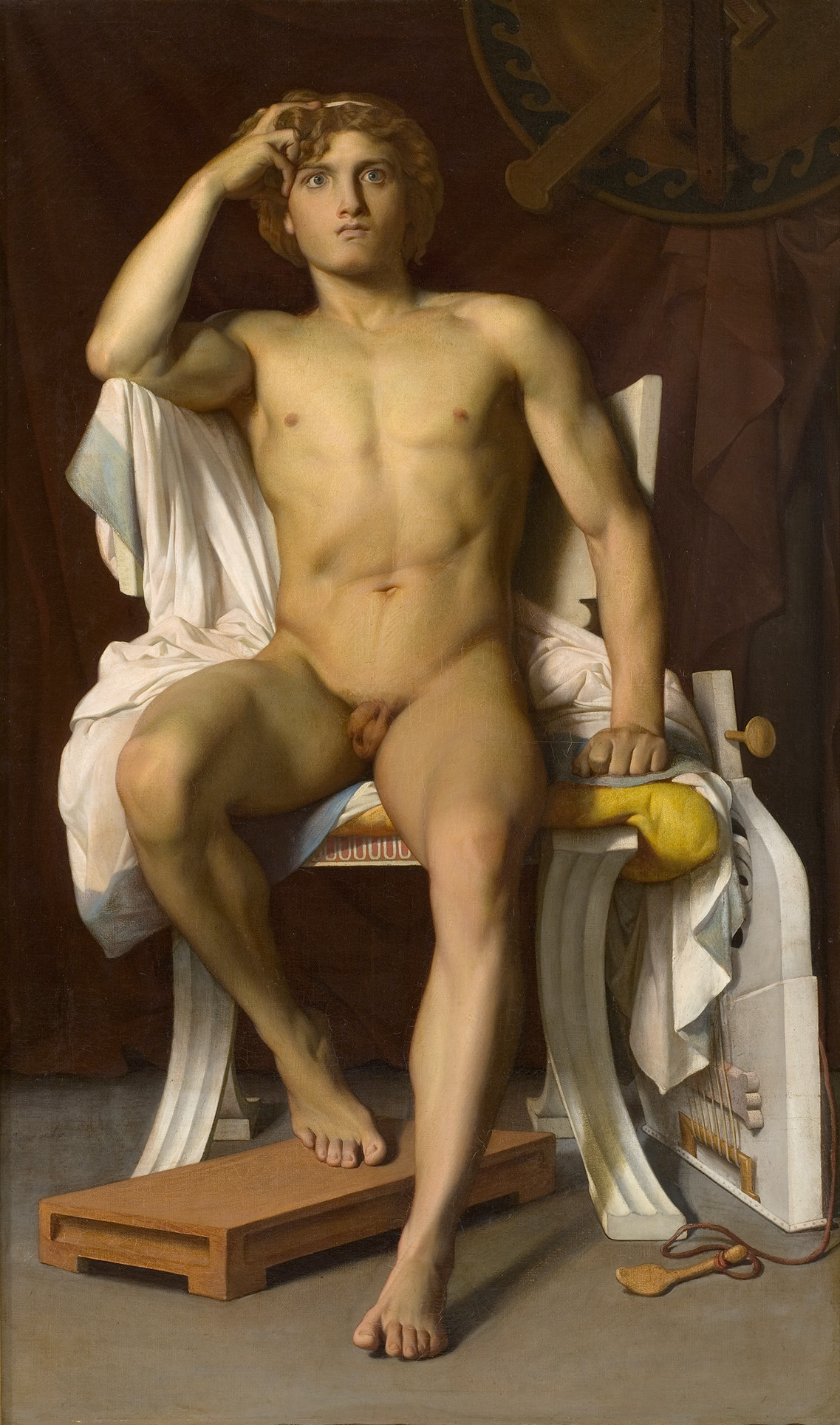
The Wrath of Achilles, by François-Léon Benouville (1821-1859) at the Musée Fabre

The town of Montpellier was given thirty paintings in 1802 which formed the basis of a modest municipal museum under the Empire, moving between various temporary sites. In 1825, the town council accepted a large donation of works from François-Xavier Fabre and the museum was installed in the refurbished Hôtel de Massillian, officially opened on 3 December 1828. Fabre's generosity led others to follow his example, notably Antoine Valedau who donated his collection of Dutch and Flemish masters to the city. On the death of Fabre (Baron since 1828) in 1837, a legacy of more than a hundred pictures and drawings completed the collection.

In 1864, Jules Bonnet-Mel, an art collector from Pézenas, bequeathed 400 drawings and 28 paintings. In 1868, Alfred Bruyas gave the works from his private gallery to the city. He is credited with having moved the museum collection into the modern era. In 1870, Jules Canonge, from Nîmes, gave a collection of more than 350 drawings. A legacy of Bruyas of more than 200 works completed his gift in 1877.

In 1968 the hotel Cabrières-Sabatier d’Espeyran was donated to the city, along with its contents. The structure had been built under the Third Republic. Around 2001, the Library moved out of the complex, freeing a sizeable area and offering the chance to carry out a major modernisation and enhancement of the building. This took four years and included a whole new wing. The building re-opened in February 2007.

== Collection ==
The extensive exhibition space allows Musée Fabre to display 800 paintings, 900 engravings, and 3,500 drawings. On display are also ceramics from Greece and the rest of Europe. Furthermore, the museum has a large collection of paintings from the 17th until the 19th century, with a large representation of the luminophiles movement. There is also sculpture.

=== Painting from 15th to 18th century ===
Some of the well-known painters featured in the museum:

French :

- Jacques-Louis David 5 paintings including Hector, Portrait of Doctor Alphonse Leroy
- Alexandre Cabanel
- Sébastien Bourdon
- Jean-Honoré Fragonard (The Palette Game and The See-Saw, both on loan from the Louvre)
- Nicolas Poussin (Venus and Adonis)
- Simon Vouet
- Gaspard Dughet
- Charles Le Brun
- Nicolas de Largillière
- Hyacinthe Rigaud
- Jean-Baptiste Oudry
- Carle Van Loo
- Claude Joseph Vernet
- Jean-Baptiste Greuze : 9 paintings including Le Petit Paresseux, Twelfth Night Cake
- Hubert Robert

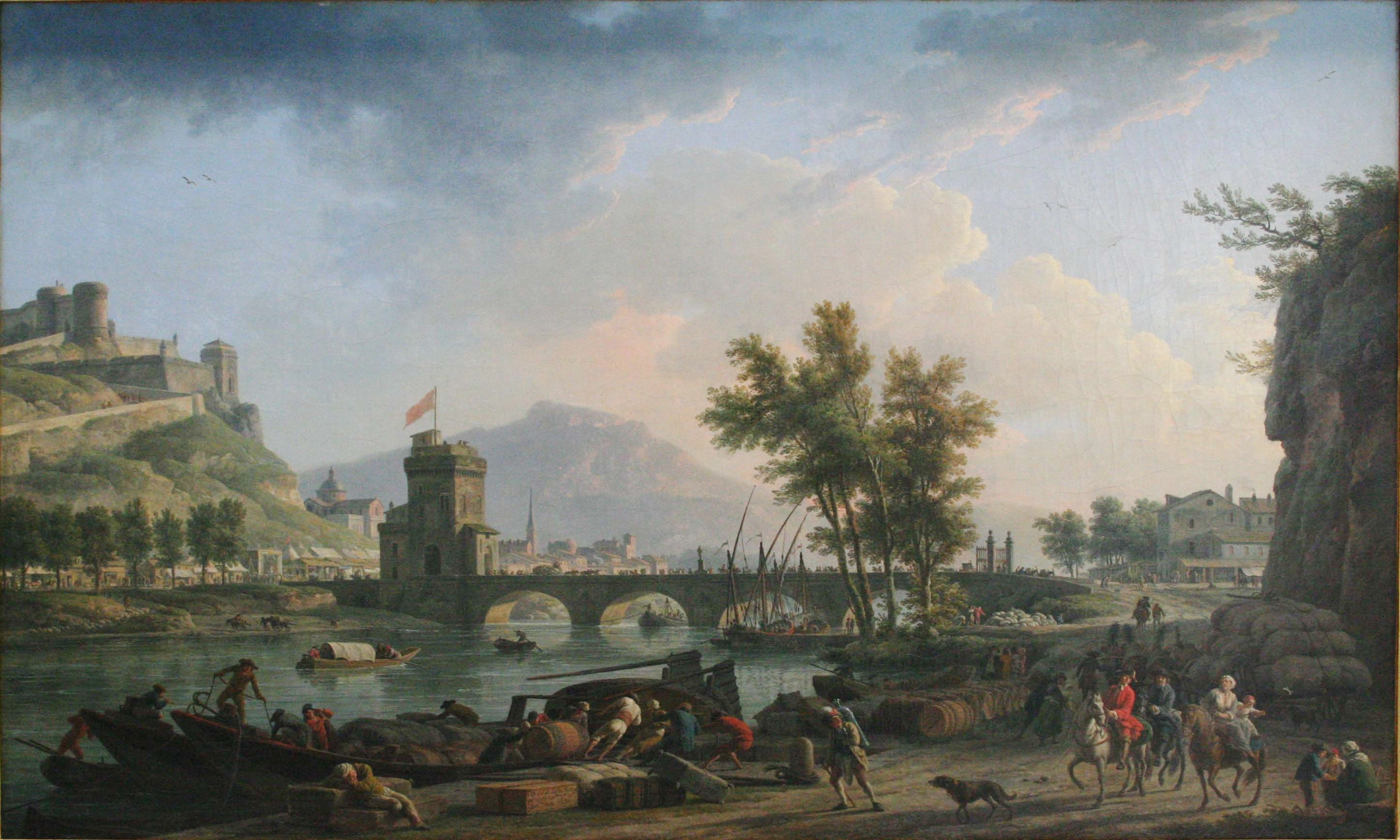
The Approach to a Fair by Claude-Joseph Vernet, 1774

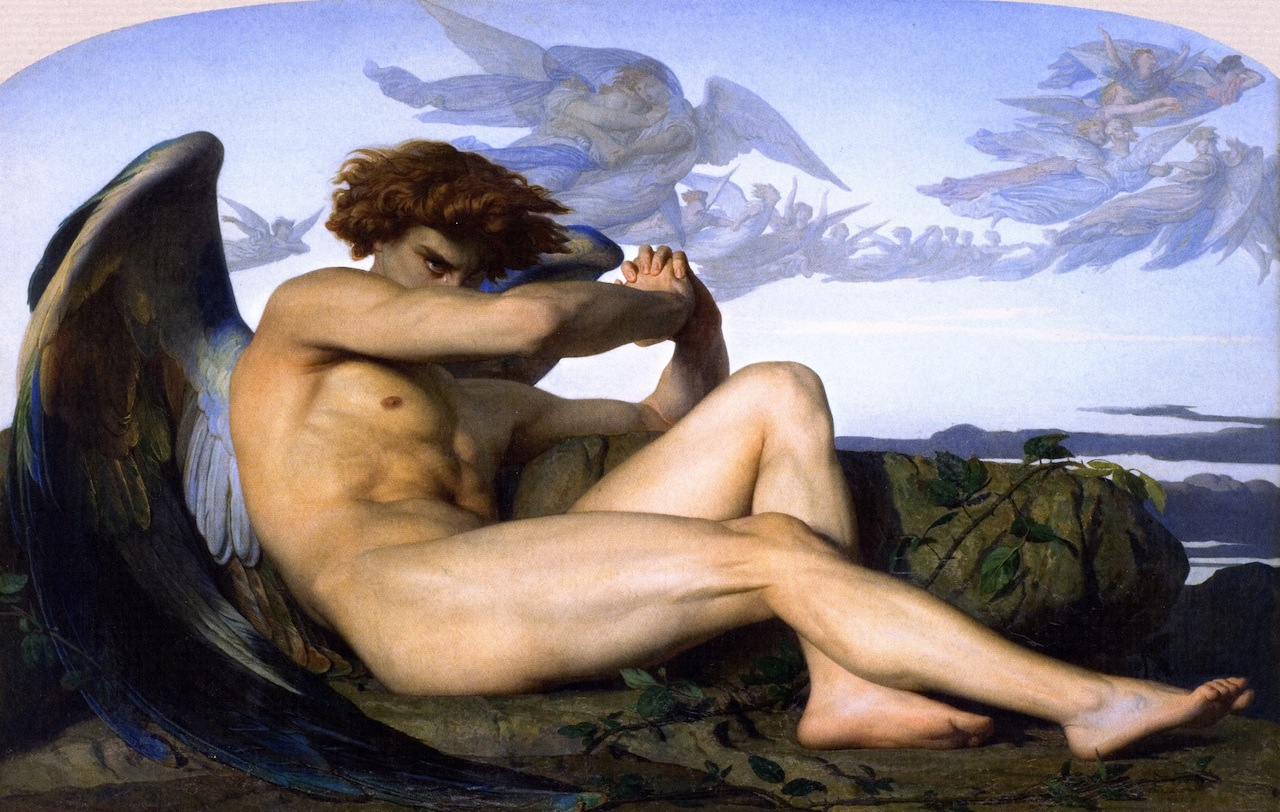
The Fallen Angel, by Alexandre Cabanel, at the Musée Fabre

Outside France :

- Italy :
  - Jacopo Bassano
  - Paolo Veronese
  - Annibale Carracci
  - Alessandro Allori : 3 paintings including Venus and Cupid
  - Federico Zuccari
  - Bernini
  - Il Guercino : 2 paintings
  - Domenichino : 2 paintings
  - Salvator Rosa
  - Luca Giordano
  - Mattia Preti
  - Francesco Guardi
  - Giovanni Pannini
- Flanders and Holland :
  - Pieter Brueghel the Younger : 2 paintings
  - Peter Paul Rubens : 3 paintings
  - Jacob Isaakszoon van Ruisdael : 3 paintings
  - Gerrit Dou
  - Gabriel Metsu : 2 paintings
  - Frans van Mieris the Elder : Young Woman Stringing Pearls
  - Gerard ter Borch
  - Jan Steen : 2 paintings
  - Adriaen van Ostade
  - David Teniers the Younger : 8 paintings
- Spain :
  - Francisco Zurbarán : 2 paintings including The Angel Gabriel
  - Jusepe Ribera
- Other :
  - Anton Raphael Mengs
  - Joshua Reynolds

=== Painting from the 19th and 20th century, with a number of Fauvist painters ===
- Frédéric Bazille (Vue de village, Aigues-Mortes, La Toilette, Atelier de la rue Furstenberg)
- François-Léon Benouville (The Wrath of Achilles)
- Gustave Courbet 15 paintings including The Bathers or Les Baigneuses, Bonjour Monsieur Courbet
- Eugène Delacroix (Fantasia, Algerian women in their room)
- Kees van Dongen (Portrait of Fernande Olivier)
- Raoul Dufy
- Jean Hugo
- Albert Marquet
- Pierre Soulages
- Nicolas de Staël
- Claude Viallat
- Maria Helena Vieira da Silva
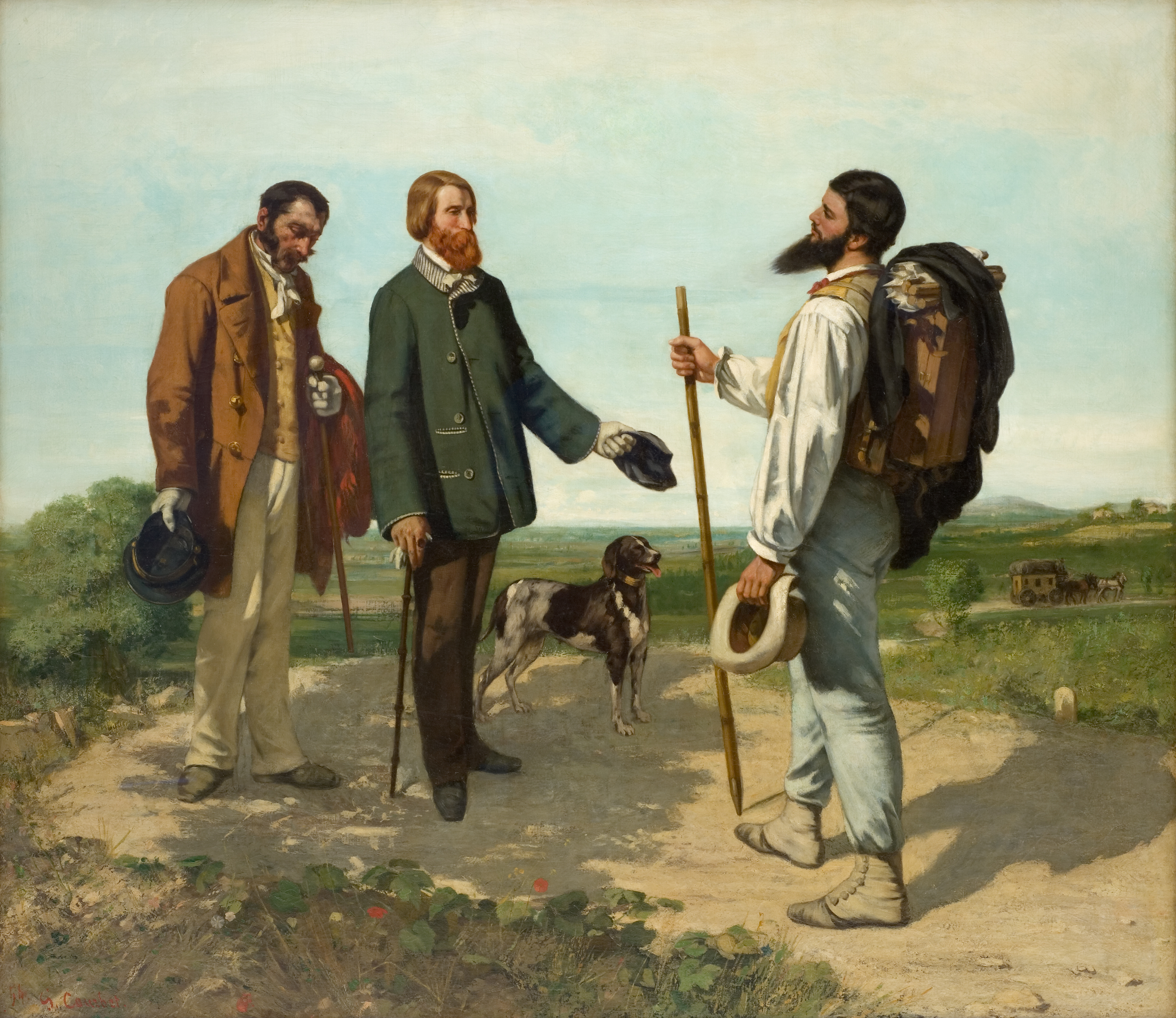
Bonjour, Monsieur Courbet (Gustave Courbet)

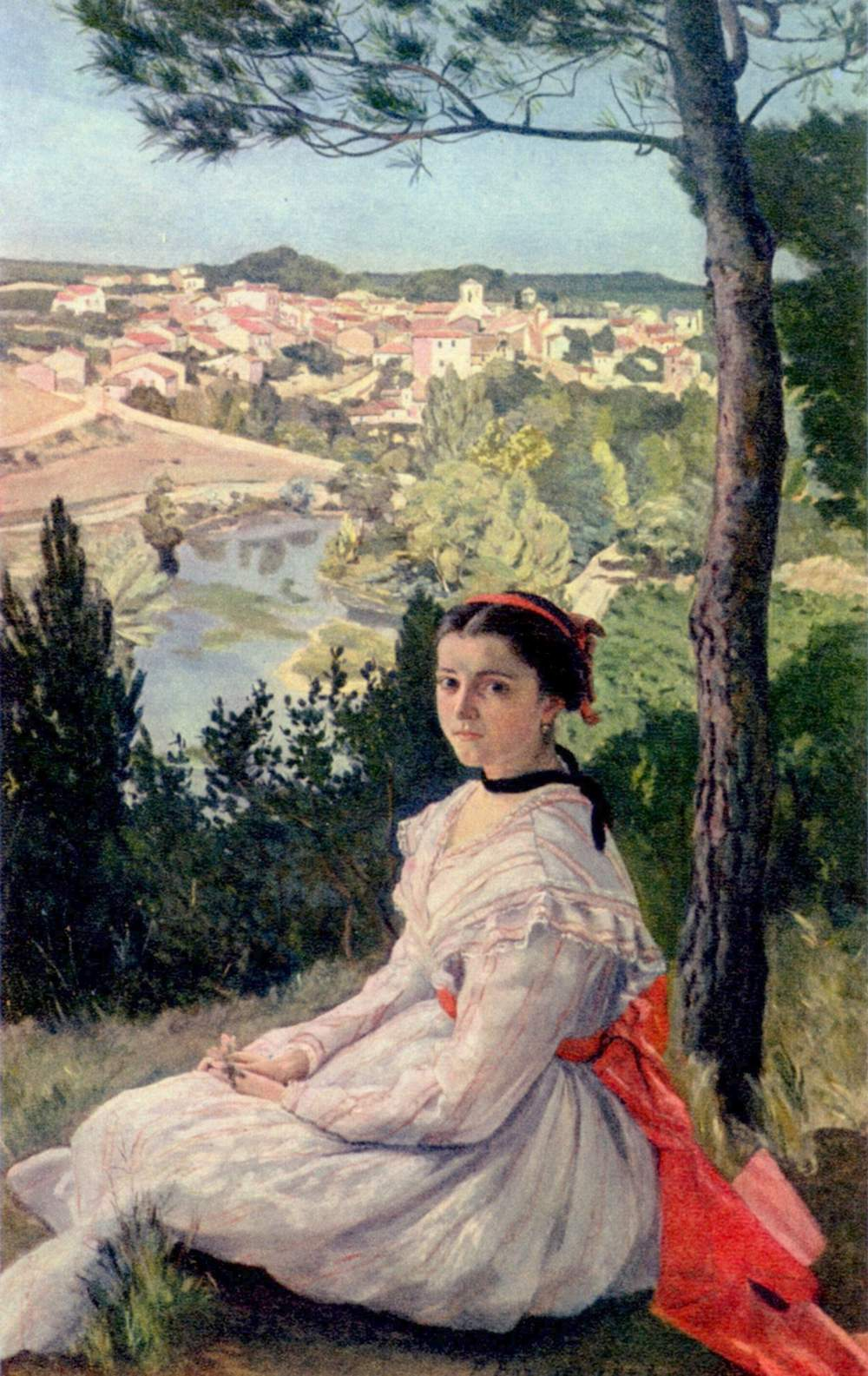
Vue de village (Frédéric Bazille)

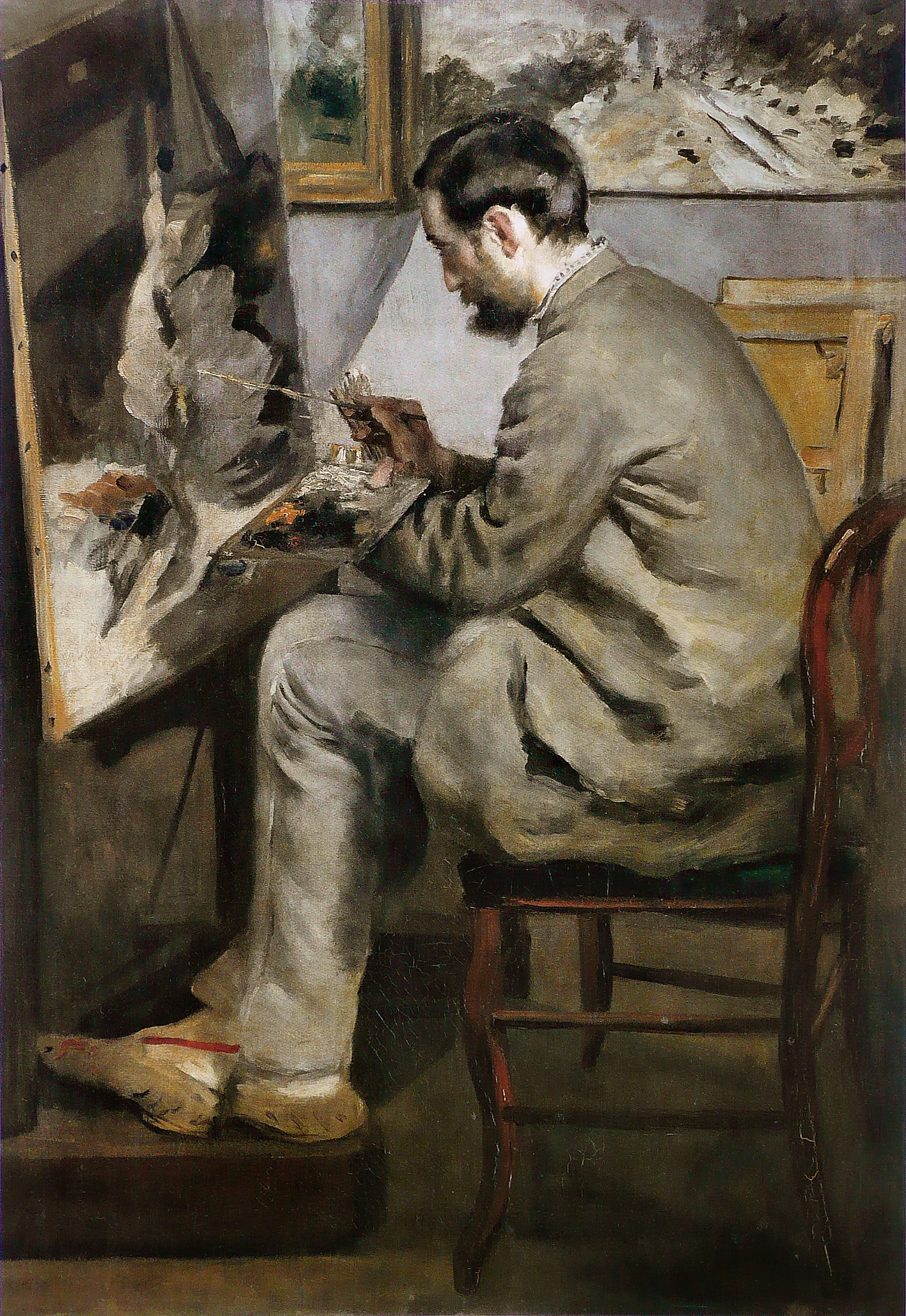
Frédéric Bazille at his Easel (Pierre-Auguste Renoir)

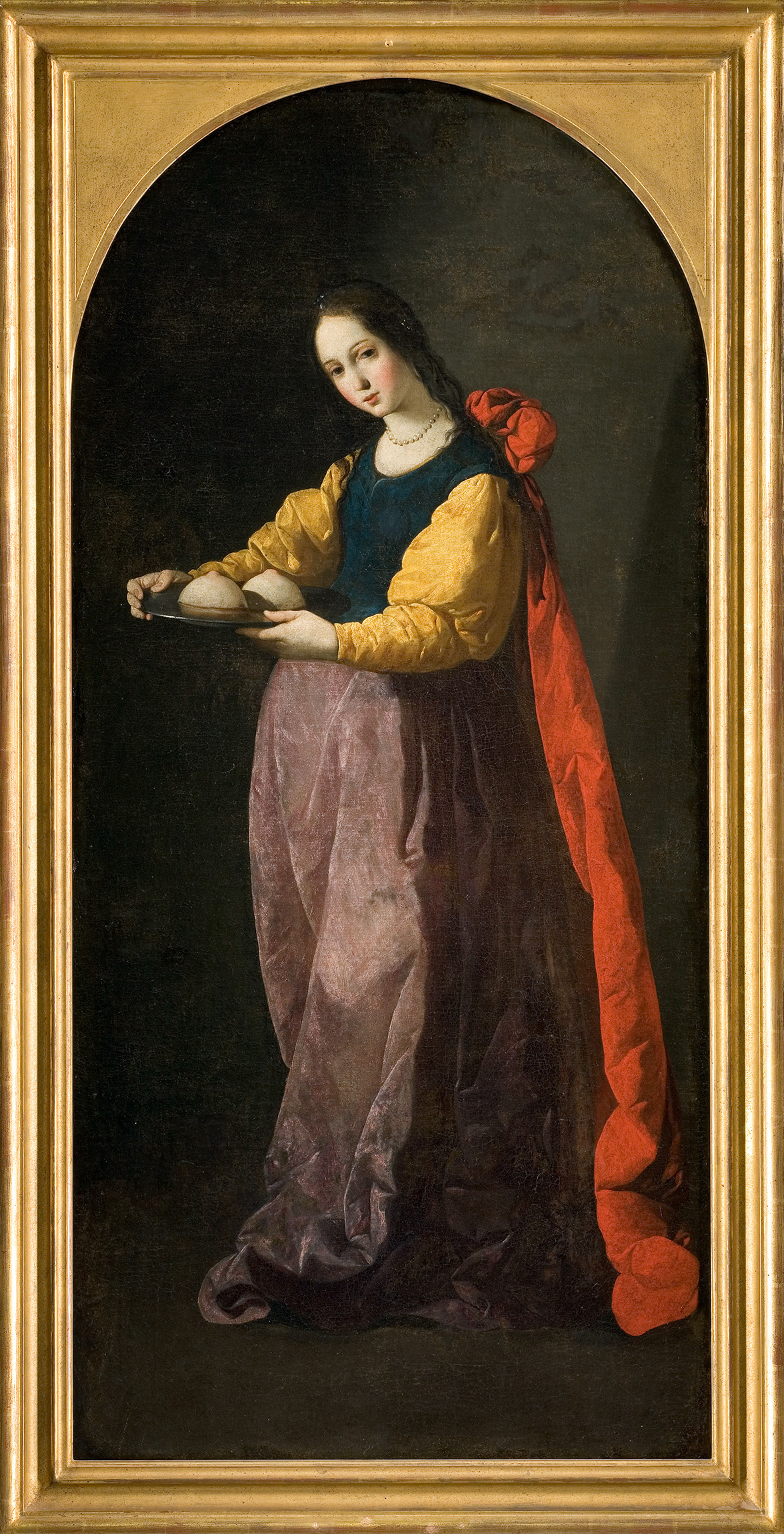
Saint Agatha (Francisco de Zurbarán)

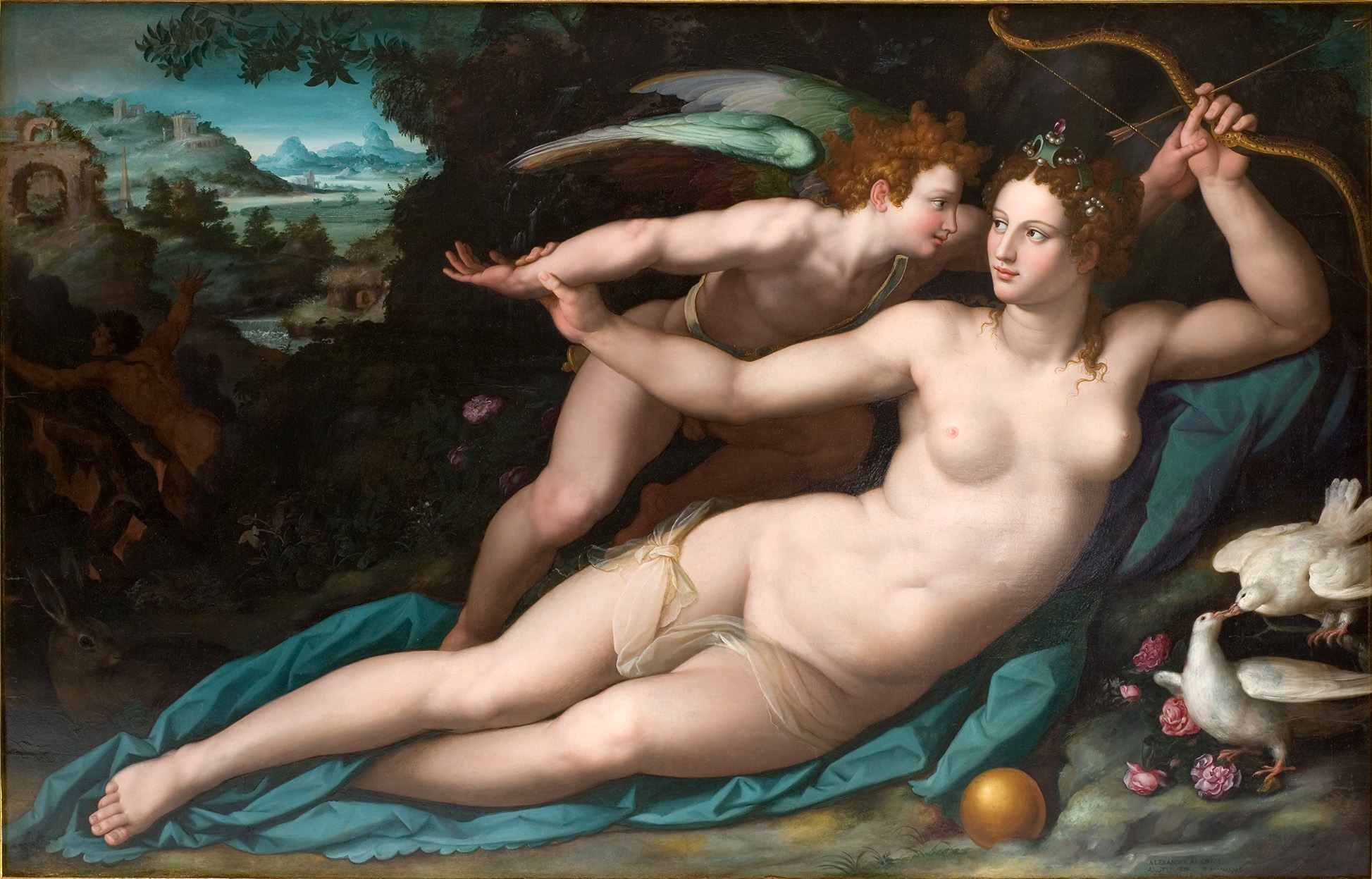
Venus and Cupid (Alessandro Allori)

=== Sculpture ===
- Antoine Bourdelle
- Jean-Antoine Houdon (Summer, Winter)
- René Iché
- Aristide Maillol
- Germaine Richier

== See also ==
- List of Jesuit sites
- List of largest art museums
