= PRINS =

PRINS may mean:

- The Dutch surname Prins
- PRINS (gene) a non-coding RNA gene
