= Prins =

Prins (Dutch: Prince) is a Dutch surname. In 2007, Prins was the 48th most common surname in the Netherlands (15,361 people). The surname does not derive from an ancestor who was a prince. Instead, the original may have lived in or worked at a location, like a windmill or inn, with that name, or was called "the prince" as a nickname. Historical records note Sephardic Italian Jewish surname of Principe or Prinzi later being changed to the more locally accepted Prins (and then Prince once in England or Colonial America).

People with the name Prins include:

- Ada Prins (1879–1977), Dutch chemist
- A. H. J. Prins (1921–2000), Dutch Africanist and maritime anthropologist
- Adolphe Prins (1845–1919), Belgian jurist and criminologist
- Alwin de Prins (born 1978), Luxembourgish swimmer
- Anna Prins (born 1991), American basketball player
- Anthony Winkler Prins (1817–1903), author of Winkler Prins a Dutch encyclopedia
- Ary Prins (1816–1867), Dutch jurist and politician, twice interim Governor General of the Dutch East Indies
- Benjamin Prins (1860–1934), Dutch genre painter
- Cecilia Prins (born 1979), Swedish politician
- Celine Prins (born 1984), Dutch fashion model
- Co Prins (1938–1987), Dutch football player
- Dave Prins (born 1968), English darts player
- Denise Prins (born 1983), Dutch cricketer
- Eliezer Liepman Philip Prins (1835–1915), Dutch merchant
- Gert-Jan Prins (born 1961), Dutch musician
- Harald Prins (born 1951), Dutch anthropologist in the US
- Hendrik Jacobus Prins (1889–1958), Dutch chemist, discovered the Prins reaction
- Igor Prins (born 1966), Estonian football player and coach
- Jan Prins (1944–2008), Dutch newspaper editor and journalist
- Jeanfrançois Prins (born 1967), Belgian jazz guitarist
- Johannes Huibert Prins (1757–1806), Dutch painter
- Johannes Jacobus Prins (1814–1898), Dutch theologian
- Laurens Prins (ca. 1630–1717), Dutch buccaneer
- Lodewijk Prins (1913–1999), Dutch chess player
- Marie Prins (born 1948), South African botanist
- Nomi Prins, American author and journalist
- Pierre Prins (1838–1913), French painter
- Piet Prins, pen name of Piet Jongeling (1909–1985), Dutch politician and children's book author
- Ray Prins (born 1951), Canadian politician
- Sharon Prins (born 1988), Dutch darts player
- Stanislav Prins (born 1988), Estonian footballer
- Stefan Prins (born 1979), Belgian composer and performer
- Vernon Prins (1924–2003), Ceylonese cricketer
- Yopie Prins (born 1959), English professor

== See also ==
- De Prins (disambiguation)
- Prin (disambiguation)
