= Hartog Jacob Hamburger =

Dutch physiologist (1859–1924)

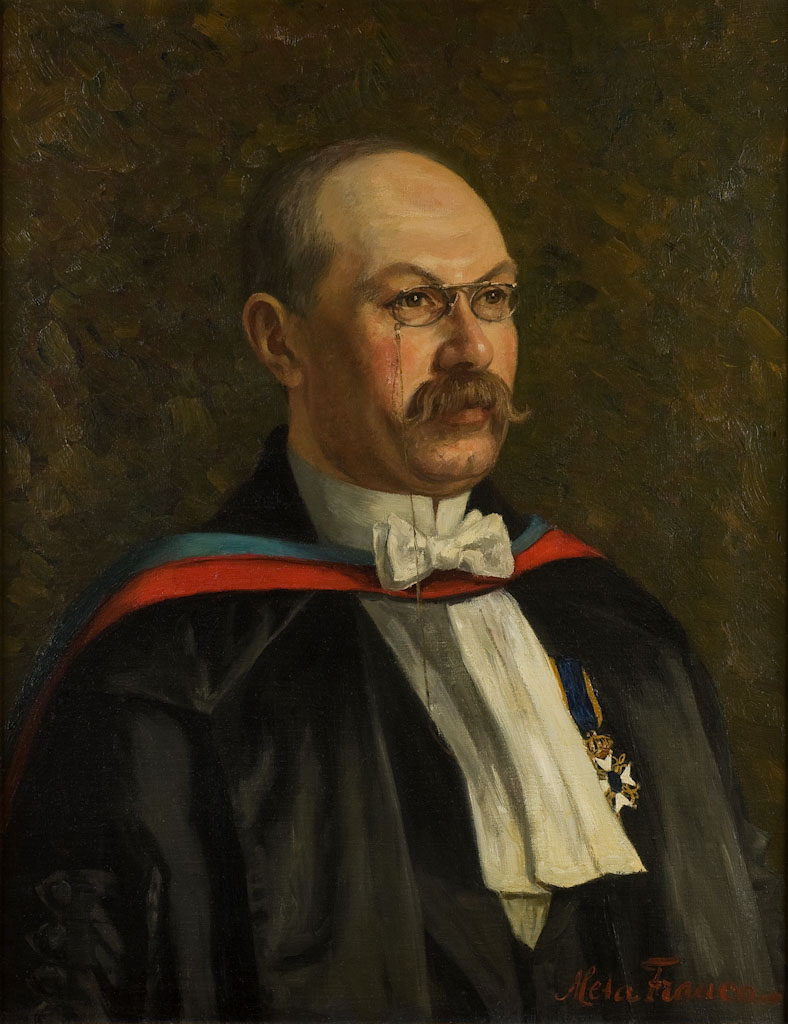
- Portrait by Meta Cohen Gosschalk
- Born: March 9, 1859; Alkmaar
- Died: January 4, 1924 (aged 64); Groningen

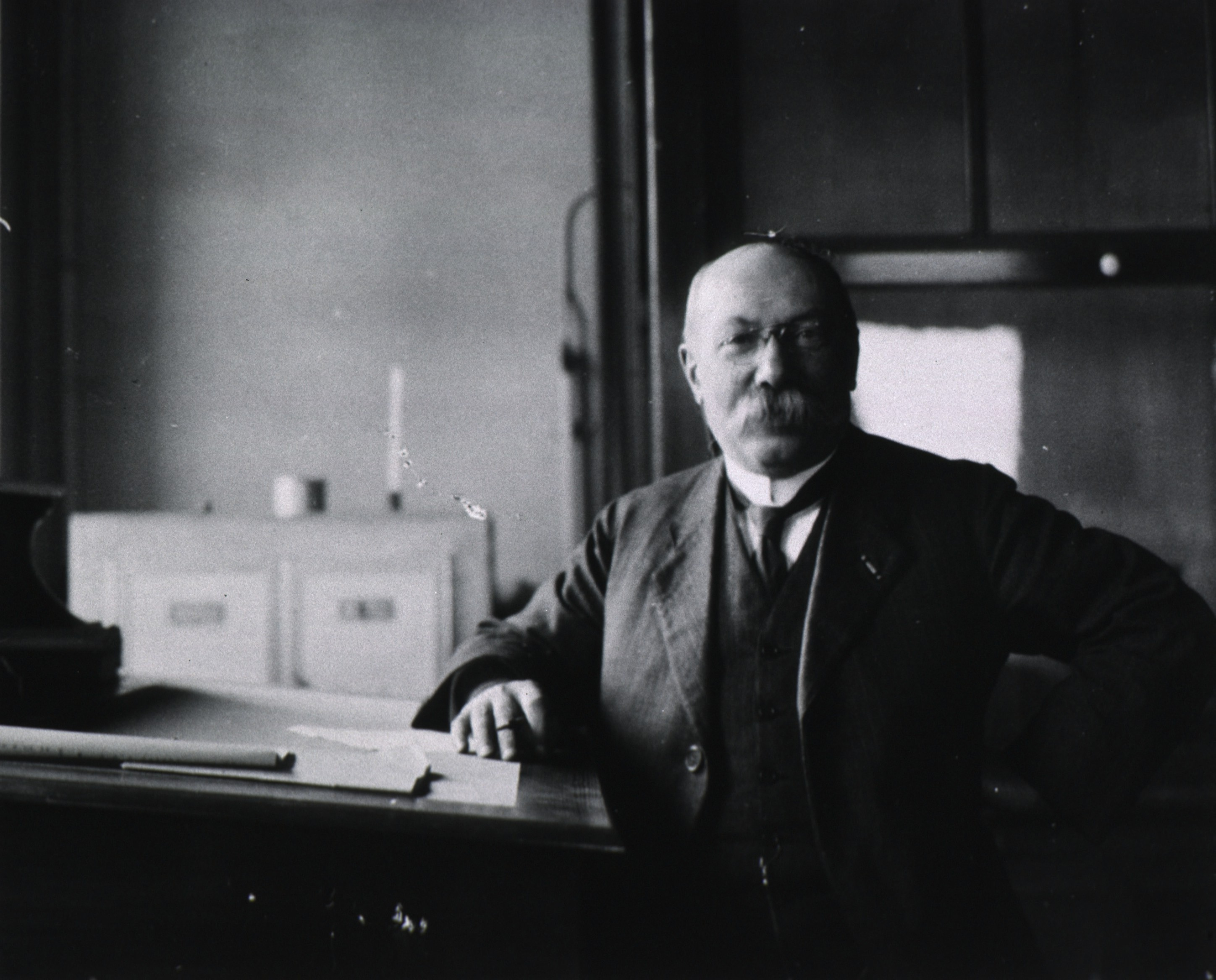
Hamburger in 1920

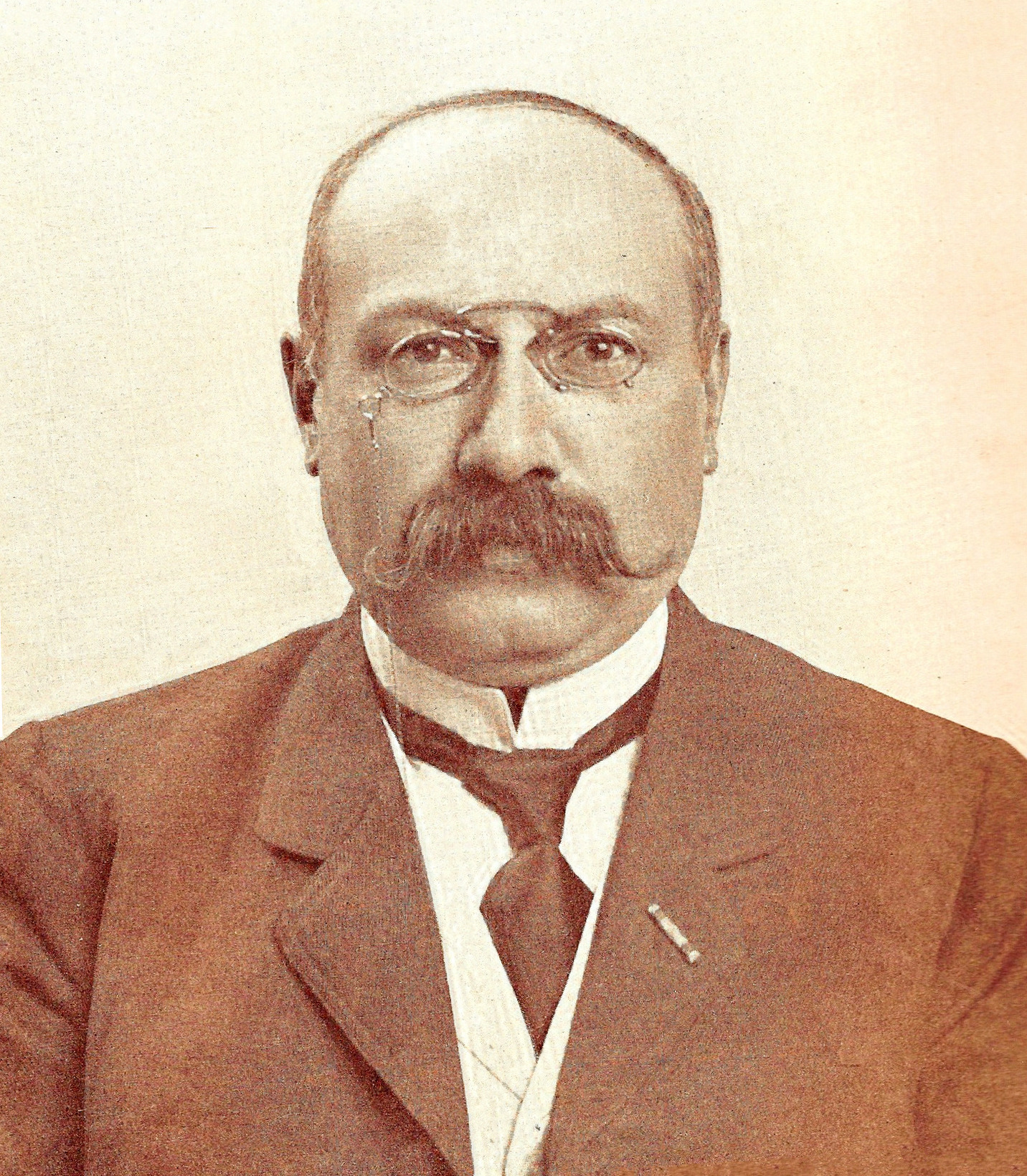
Photo of Hartog Jacob Hamburger in 1908 from the popular magazine De Prins

Hartog Jakob or Hartog Jacob Hamburger (9 March 1859 – 4 January 1924) was a Dutch physiologist, born in Alkmaar. After completing the Hogere Burgerschool in Alkmaar, Hamburger studied chemistry at Utrecht University, where he received his doctorate in 1883, on the determination of urea in urine. He subsequently worked with Utrecht ophthalmologist and physiologist Franciscus Cornelis Donders for seven years, and completed a medical degree.

From 1888 he lectured in physiology and pathology at the National Veterinary School, also in Utrecht. In 1896, he invented the crystalloid solution known as Hamburger's solution or normal saline. Based on plant-based experiments by botanist Hugo de Vries, he developed a salt solution that was thought to have the same osmolality as human blood and therefore did not cause haemolysis of red blood cells. It is uncertain whether the saline was ever originally intended for intravenous administration.

In 1901, he joined the University of Groningen as professor of physiology. In 1911 he was instrumental in opening a dedicated physiological institute, and two years later chaired the 25th International Physiological Congress in Groningen. Between 1902 and 1904 he published Osmotischer Druck und Ionenlehre in den medecinischen Wissenschaften ("Osmotic pressure and ion science in the medical sciences"). Work on these books had started while still in Utrecht. Hamburger was serving as rector magnificus of the university when in 1914 it celebrated its 300th anniversary. Throughout his academic career he emphasised the importance of physical chemistry in health science, and he actively opposed vitalism (i.e. the view that living organisms are somehow governed by different principles from inanimate substances).

In 1918 he described the chloride shift (often called "Hamburger shift"), the process by which red blood cells exchange bicarbonate for chloride. This was initially thought to be a passive phenomenon, but was later linked to active transport by the band 3 exchanger (SLC4A1). He also conducted experiments on phagocytosis. He was the first to quantify the process of phagocytosis by incubating neutrophil granulocytes (white blood cells capable of phagocytosis) with carbon particles, and measuring the uptake.

He was a member of the Royal Netherlands Academy of Arts and Sciences (Koninklijke Nederlandse Akademie van Wetenschappen) and received a number of honorary degrees, including from the University of Aberdeen, the Veterinary College at Utrecht and the University of Padua. He died in 1924 at Groningen at the age of 64.

== Bibliography ==
- Festband der Biochemischen Zeitschrift, H.J. Hamburger gewidmet zur Feier seiner vor fünfundzwanzig Jahren erfolgten Doktorpromotion von seinen Freunden und Verehrern ('Festschrift of the Biochemischen Zeitschrift, dedicated to H.J. Hamburger on the occasion of the 25th anniversary of the award of his doctorate by his friends and admirers'), Berlin: Verlag von Julius Springer, 1908.
