= The Collector of Prints (Degas) =

1866 oil-on-canvas painting

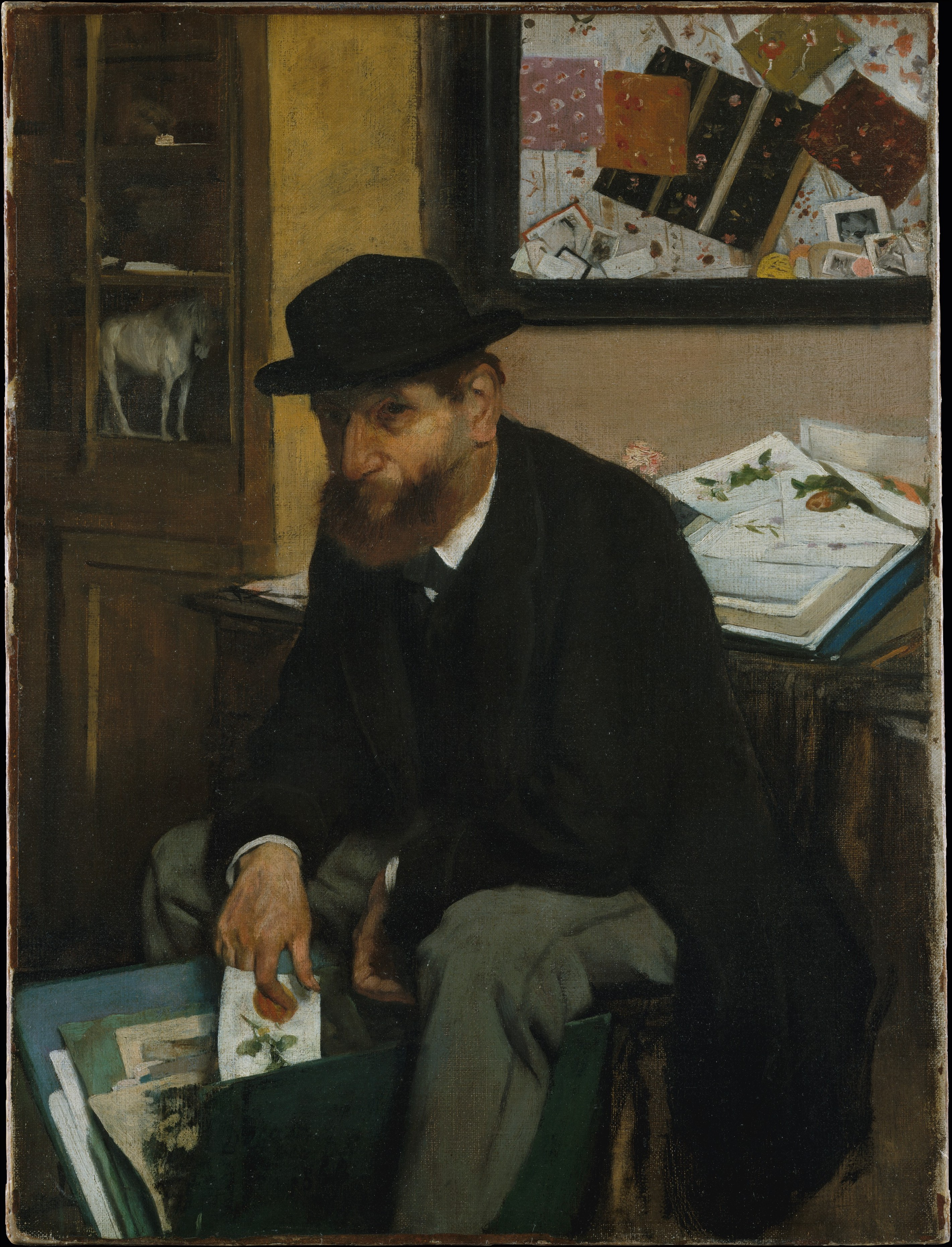
- Artist: Edgar Degas
- Year: 1866
- Medium: Oil on canvas
- Dimensions: 53 cm × 40 cm (21 in × 16 in)
- Location: Metropolitan Museum of Art, New York
- Accession: 29.100.44

The Collector of Prints is an oil-on-canvas painting by the French Impressionist artist Edgar Degas. The painting, which was produced in 1866, depicts an unknown male subject sitting down, pausing while browsing through a portfolio of prints and meeting the viewer's gaze. This work, influenced by prominent artists and critics of the time such as Daumier, Manet, and Duranty, embodied Degas's interest in exploring complex backgrounds. As a result, the background behind the subject displays a varied compilation of photographs, cards, prints, fabrics, and other objects.

== Context ==
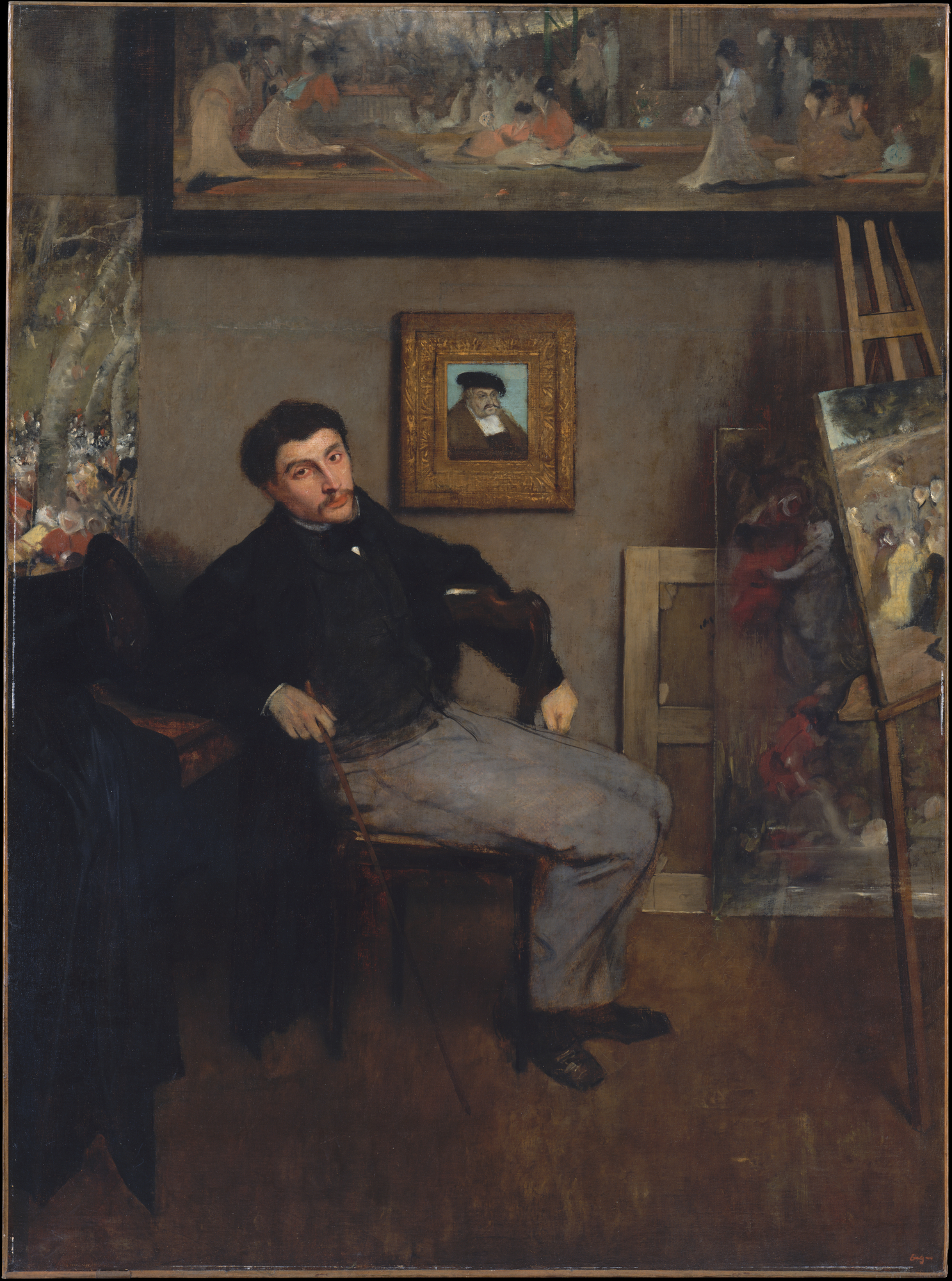
Edgar Degas' Portrait of James Tissot, 1867–68

From 1866 to 1871, Degas experimented with shifting the focus of his paintings to highlight their backgrounds, sometimes painting pictures within pictures in his works. In addition to The Collector of Prints, works such as the Portrait of James Tissot and Sulking, involved the motif. In each of these works, Degas depicted snippets of works of art from styles differing from his own. Thus, The Collector of Prints incorporates elements of Far Eastern art such as Japanese fabrics and a T'ang Dynasty figurine.

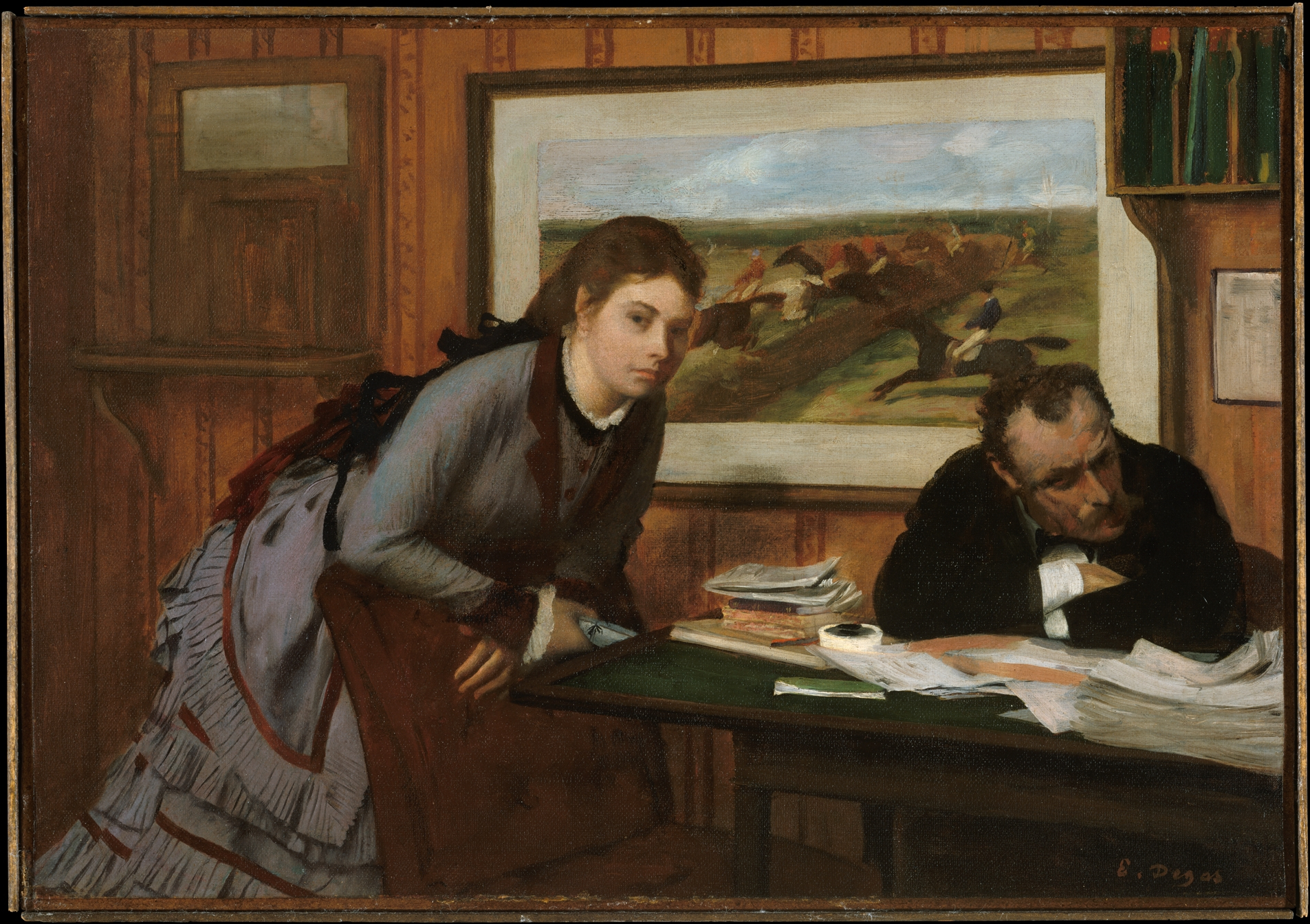
Edgar Degas' Sulking, 1870

== Analysis ==
Since Degas approached this painting with the intent to create a complex background, one of the most intricate components of the painting can be found on the bulletin board located to the right of the unknown sitter. The wide array of items pinned to it consists of European stationery products and, most visibly, fragments of Japanese embroidered silk. The small pieces of fabric were likely meant for pocketbooks and jacket linings; Japanese fabrics were popular among French collectors at the time due to their unconventional color combinations and aesthetic novelty. Degas, who collected Japanese art himself, aimed to incorporate this art style into this painting.

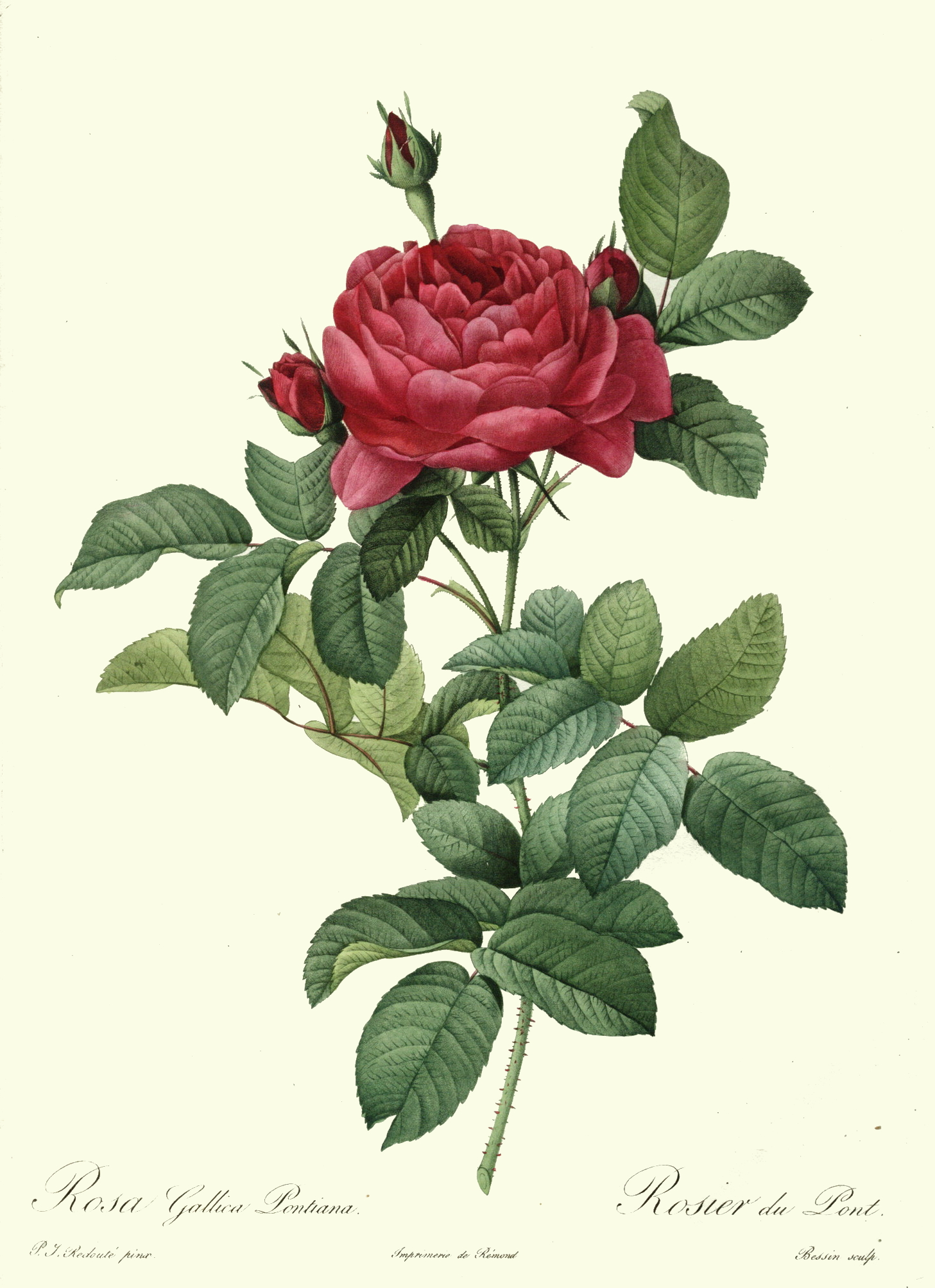
Redoute's Rosa Gallica Pontiana

Other important components of the background can be found on the table behind the sitter along with the cupboard to his left. The papers located on top of the table have been identified as small color lithographs of flowers, which had been popularized earlier in the century through the works of Pierre Redouté. Degas shows the sitter browsing through floral prints that are stylistically similar to Redoute's Rosa Gallica Pontiana. These lithographs, in addition to being on the table in the back, can also be found in the portfolio that the male subject is browsing. In the cupboard, the most conspicuous element is the white ceramic horse figure located on the bottom level. This figurine resembles those produced in China during the T'ang Dynasty through its pose and anatomical features, such as the bent head and flaring nostrils.

Art historians have offered various characterizations of the painting's sitter. Some describe him as a specific kind of collector, a passionate fanatic devoted to his next find, not someone who merely spends lavishly to follow fashion. Other commentators describe him as a modest collector with whom Degas personally identified, echoing his confession that "I have only known to accumulate beautiful pictures, not money." Others similarly note how Degas was an individual who, having been exposed to interactions with collectors during his youth and eventually becoming one himself, was portraying a collector who had a deep commitment to art and disregard for oneself.

== Influences ==
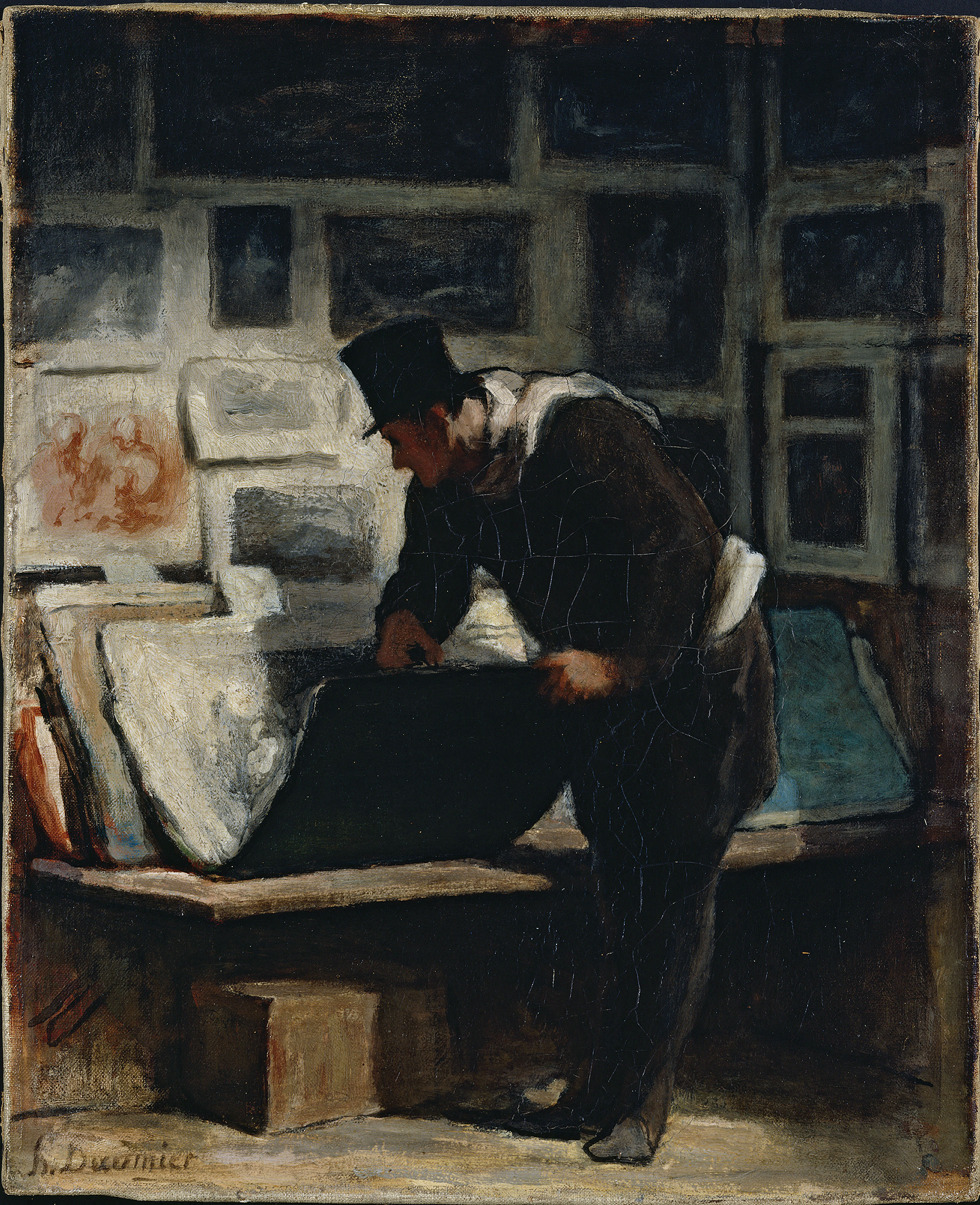
Daumier's The Print Collector, 1860

For this work, Degas responded to the advice of Manet and Duranty about avoiding the separation of the subject and the setting of a painting. Degas therefore sought to integrate the subject with the background.

Degas was also influenced by Daumier's The Print Collector, which was painted six years prior. Both works revolve around men surrounded by their collections. In contrast to Daumier's work, however, Degas chose to paint his subject directly looking at the viewer and with a variety of objects from different artistic styles.

== Ownership ==
In 1895, Louisine Havemeyer purchased the painting through Durand-Ruel. Today, it is in The Metropolitan Museum of Art of New York City in Gallery 815.
