= Ageeth =

Ageeth is a feminine given name, a Dutch equivalent of Agatha, which is of Greek origin and means "good". Notable people with the given name include:

- Ageeth Boomgaardt (born 1972), Dutch former field hockey defender
- Ageeth Scherphuis (1933–2012), Dutch journalist
