= De Prins =

De Prins may refer to:

- Alwin de Prins (born 29 October 1978), former Belgian swimmer
- De Prins der Geïllustreerde Bladen, former Dutch magazine

== See also ==
- Prins
