= Hendrik Willem Bakhuis Roozeboom =

Dutch chemist (1854–1907)

H. W. Bakhuis Roozeboom
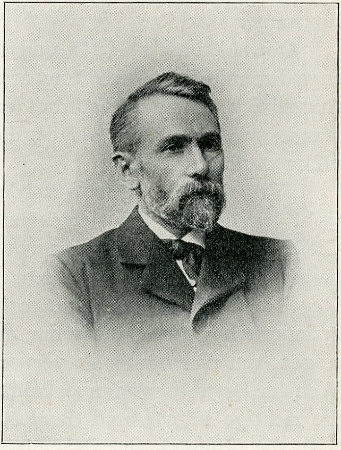
- H. W. Bakhuis Roozeboom
- Born: Hendrik Willem Bakhuis Roozeboom; October 24, 1854; Alkmaar, Netherlands
- Died: February 8, 1907 (aged 52); Amsterdam, Netherlands
- Education: University of Leiden
- Known for: physical chemistry
- Scientific career
- Fields: chemistry
- Workplaces: University of Amsterdam
- Doctoral advisor: Jakob Maarten van Bemmelen
- Doctoral students: Andreas Smits

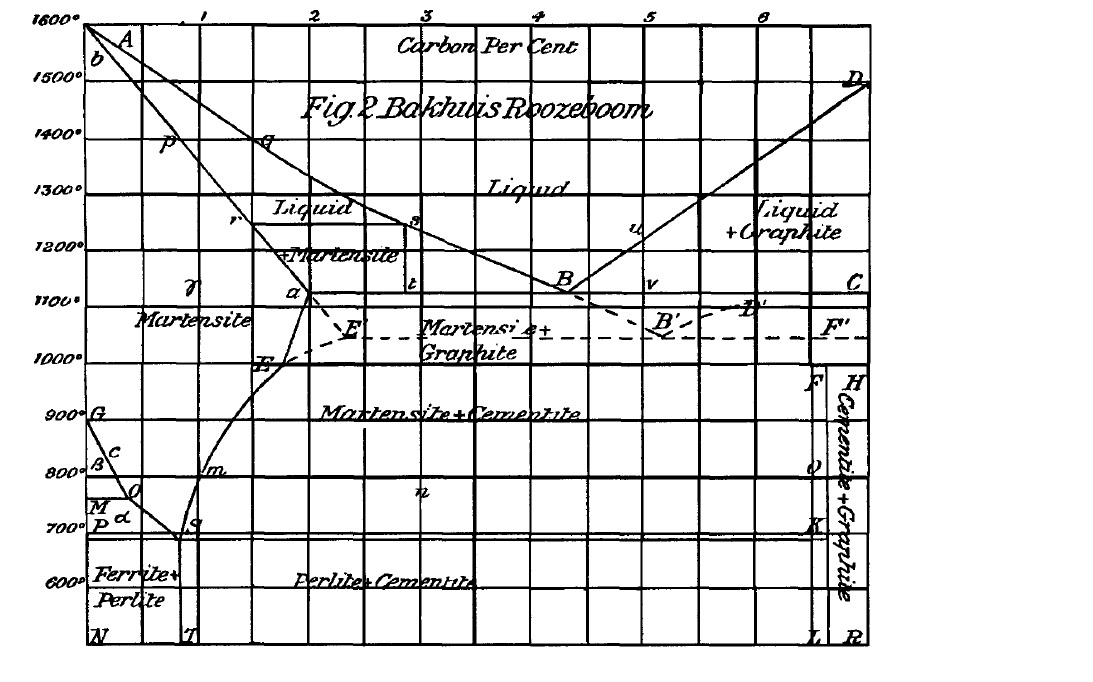
Fe- C Phase Diagram, H.W.B. Reozeboom, The Metallographist, 3, 293-300(1900).

Hendrik Willem Bakhuis Roozeboom (Dutch pronunciation: [ˈɦɛndrɪk ˈʋɪləm ˈbɑkɦœys ˈroːzəboːm]; October 24, 1854 – February 8, 1907) was a Dutch chemist who studied phase behaviour in physical chemistry.

== Education and career ==
Bakhuis Roozeboom (originally "Bakhuys Roozeboom") was born in Alkmaar in the Netherlands. Financial difficulties did not allow him to directly pursue a university education, and he left school to work in a chemical factory for some time. Due to support from his mentor, J. M. van Bemmelen, he became an assistant at the University of Leiden in 1878, which enabled him to start his academic education there. In 1881 he became a teacher at a girls school, and in 1884 he obtained his PhD with works on the hydrates of acids. J. D. van der Waals introduced him to the theoretical works of J. Willard Gibbs on the phase rule which so far had little experimental verification in chemistry, prompting him to start a lifelong research program on phase equilibria. In 1896, he became a professor for chemistry at the University of Amsterdam, where he died on February 8, 1907.

Bakhuis Roozeboom's main work was in the field of thermodynamics, in which he studied the equilibrium of multiple-phase systems. The theoretical foundations for this were laid by J. Willard Gibbs with his phase rule, but Roozeboom would be the one to apply the theory and demonstrate its usefulness. He is mainly remembered for his melting phase diagrams of metal alloys, i.e. studying how mixtures of metals melt depending on the relative amounts of the components, which is important for metallurgy. Roozeboom also was the first to plot ternary phase equilibria in two-dimensional plots that were taken as vertical or horizontal slices from the three-dimensional solid diagrams. These are termed, respectively, isopleths and isotherms. He also contributed to the science of chiral substances, clarified how to distinguish the different types of crystalline racemates and predicted how mixtures of enantiomers behave in a heterogeneous system of solid and solution.

In 1890 Bakhuis Roozeboom became a member of the Royal Netherlands Academy of Arts and Sciences. Roozeboom succeeded J. H. van't Hoff at the University of Amsterdam. In 1904, he published the first volume and first part of the second volume of the multi-volume treatise on heterogeneous equilibria entitled Die Heterogenen Gleichgewichte von Standpunkte des Phasenlehre "Heterogeneous Equilibria from the Phase Rule Viewpoint."

In 1911, the Bakhuis Roozeboom Fund was established in his honour; every four years it awards a gold medal for research on phase theory.
