= Printz =

Printz is a surname and may refer to:

== People ==
- Armegot Printz (1625–1695), Swedish noblewoman, daughter of Johan Björnsson Printz
- David Printz (born 1980), Swedish ice hockey player
- Gisèle Printz (1933–2025), French politician
- Göran Printz-Påhlson (1931-2006), Swedish poet
- Johan Björnsson Printz (1592–1663), 17th-century Swedish governor of New Sweden
- Johan Casper Printz (1671–1746), 18th-century Swedish Navy officer
- Mary Printz (1923-2009), American answering service operator
- Wolfgang Printz (1641–1717), German composer

== Other ==
- Printz Board (born 1982), American musician
- Michael L. Printz Award, young adult book award named after a Kansas librarian
- Printz v. United States, 1997 US Supreme Court case

== See also ==
- Prinz (disambiguation)
- Prince (disambiguation)
- Prins (disambiguation)
- Prin (disambiguation)
