= Andreas Smits =

Dutch chemist (1870-1948)

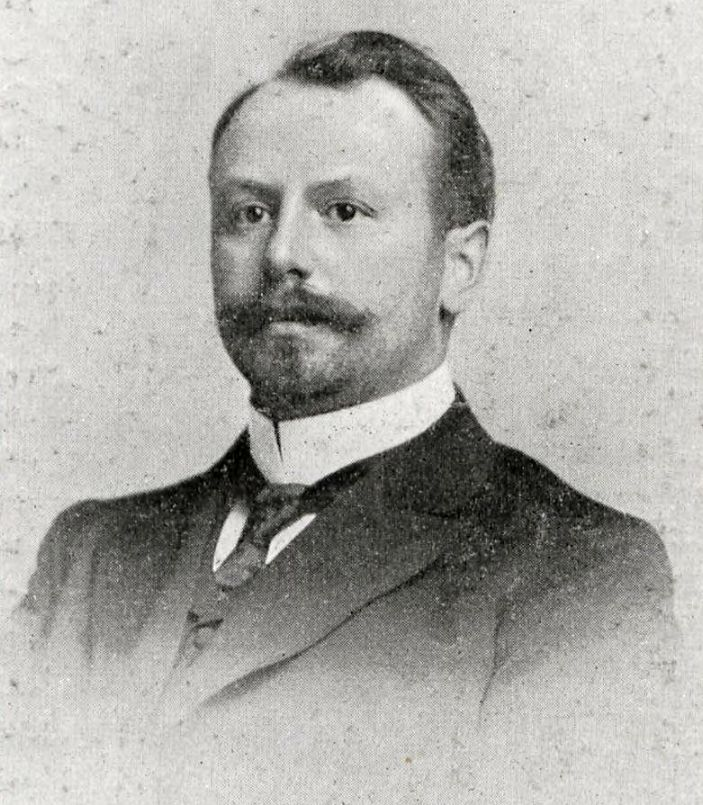
Prof. dr. A. Smits, 1907

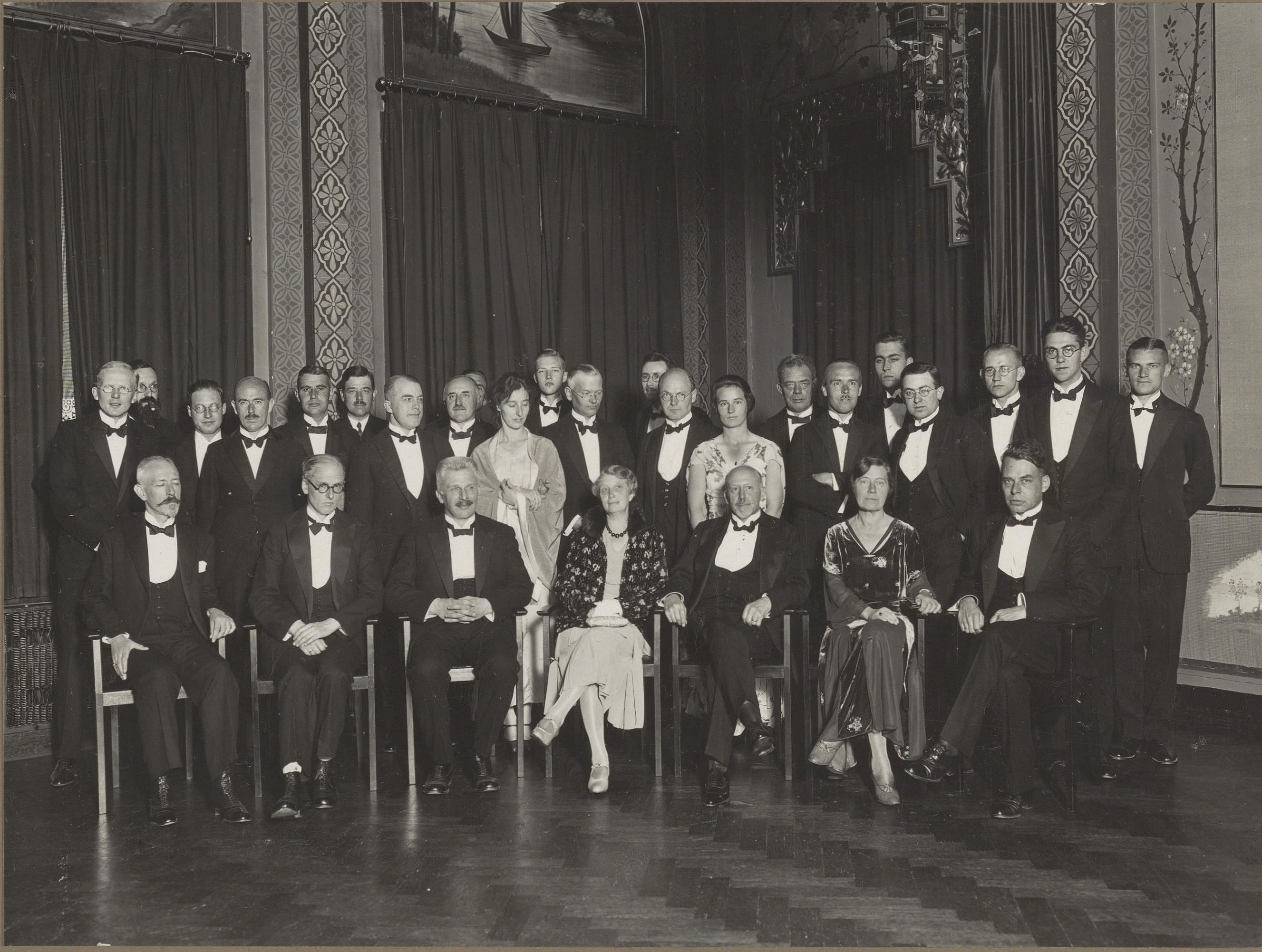
Smits in 1931 on his 25th year as professor, seated left to right E.H. Büchner, J. P. Wibaut, F.E.C. Scheffer, Mrs Smits, Andreas Smits, Ada Prins and J.M. Bijvoet.

Andreas Smits (14 June 1870 – 13 November 1948) was a Dutch chemist who specialized in physical and inorganic chemistry and examined aspects of phase change and conversions between allotropic forms. He was a professor at the Delft University of Technology and University of Amsterdam.

Smits was born in Woerden and attended high school in Utrecht. He studied chemistry and received a degree from the University of Utrecht, and a doctorate from the University of Giessen (1896) with a dissertation on "Untersuchungen mit dem Mikromanometer." He then worked as a chemist in the Amsterdam Municipal Gasworks before joining the University of Amsterdam in 1901. He became a professor at the Delft University of Technology in 1906 and worked there until his retirement in 1940. He published Die Theorie der Allotropie (1921) and Die Theorie der Komplexität und der Allotropie (1938).

Papers by Smits include:

- Smits, Andreas; Swart, Emanuel (1929). "CCCLXII.—Necessary procedures for the exact determination of vapour tensions". J. Chem. Soc.: 2724–2726. doi:10.1039/JR9290002724. ISSN 0368-1769.
- Smits, Andreas; Schoenmaker, Pieter (1926). "CXLV.—The complexity of the solid state. Part III. The behaviour of pure sulphur trioxide. Part II". J. Chem. Soc. 129: 1108–1127. doi:10.1039/JR9262901108. ISSN 0368-1769.
- Smits, Andreas; Schoenmaker, Pieter (1924). "CCCLI.—The complexity of the solid state. Part I. The behaviour of pure sulphur trioxide. Part I". J. Chem. Soc., Trans. 125: 2554–2573. doi:10.1039/CT9242502554. ISSN 0368-1645.
- Smits, Andreas (1928). "CCCXIX.—The densi-tensimeter". J. Chem. Soc.: 2409–2410. doi:10.1039/JR9280002409. ISSN 0368-1769.
- Smits, Andreas; Schoenmaker, Pieter (1926). "CCIX.—The complexity of the solid state. Part IV. The behaviour of pure sulphur trioxide. Part III". J. Chem. Soc. 129: 1603–1607. doi:10.1039/JR9262901603. ISSN 0368-1769.
- Smith, Andreas; Rutgers, Arend Joan (1924). "CCCLII.—The complexity of the solid state. Part II. The behaviour of phosphorus pentoxide. Part I". J. Chem. Soc., Trans. 125: 2573–2579. doi:10.1039/CT9242502573. ISSN 0368-1645.
- Smits, Andreas (1926). "CCCXLIX.—The influence of intensive drying on inner equilibria. Part II". J. Chem. Soc. 129: 2655–2657. doi:10.1039/JR9262902655. ISSN 0368-1769.
- Smits, Andreas (1930). "The Intensive Drying of Liquids". The Journal of Physical Chemistry. 34 (8): 1861–1865. doi:10.1021/j150314a016. ISSN 0092-7325.
