= Chloride shift =

Transfer of ions into red blood cells

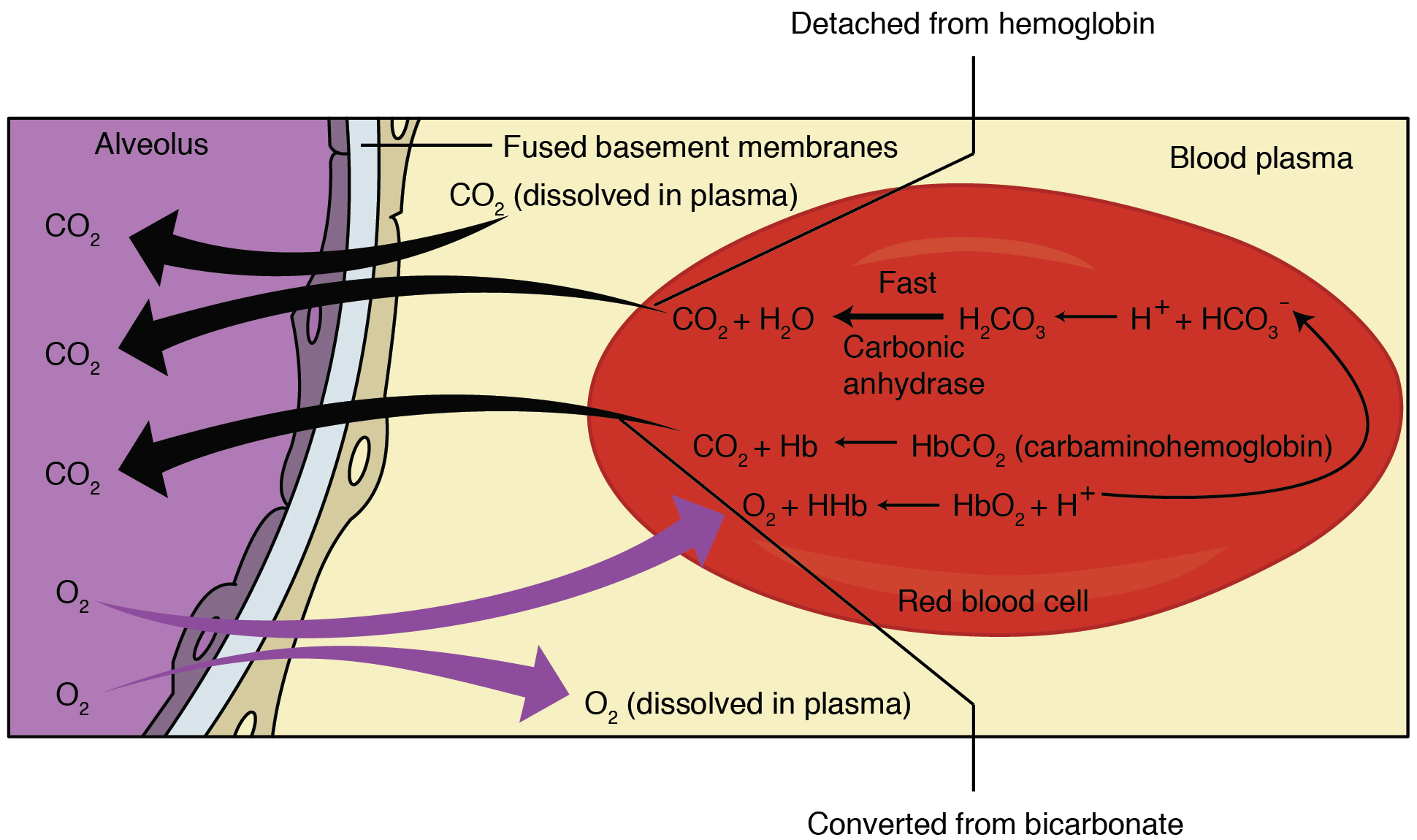

Chloride shift (also known as lineas phenomenon or Hamburger phenomenon, named after Hartog Jakob Hamburger) is a process which occurs in a cardiovascular system and refers to the exchange of bicarbonate (HCO_{3}^{–}) and chloride (Cl^{−}) across the membrane of red blood cells (RBCs).

== Mechanism ==
Carbon dioxide (CO_{2}) is produced in tissues as a byproduct of normal aerobic metabolism. It dissolves in the solution of blood plasma and into red blood cells (RBC), where carbonic anhydrase catalyzes its hydration to carbonic acid (H_{2}CO_{3}). Carbonic acid then spontaneously dissociates to form bicarbonate Ions (HCO_{3}^{–}) and a hydrogen ion (H^{+}). In response to the decrease in intracellular pCO_{2}, more CO_{2} passively diffuses into the cell.

Cell membranes are generally impermeable to charged ions (i.e. H^{+}, HCO_{3}^{–}) but RBCs are able to exchange bicarbonate for chloride using the anion exchanger protein Band 3. Thus, the rise in intracellular bicarbonate leads to bicarbonate export and chloride intake. The term "chloride shift" refers to this exchange. Consequently, chloride concentration is lower in systemic venous blood than in systemic arterial blood: high venous pCO_{2} leads to bicarbonate production in RBCs, which then leaves the RBC in exchange for chloride coming in.

The opposite process occurs in the pulmonary capillaries of the lungs when the pO_{2} rises and pCO_{2} falls, and the Haldane effect decreases. This releases hydrogen ions from hemoglobin, increases free H^{+} concentration within RBCs, and shifts the equilibrium towards CO_{2} and water formation from bicarbonate. The subsequent decrease in intracellular bicarbonate concentration reverses chloride-bicarbonate exchange: bicarbonate moves into the cell in exchange for chloride moving out. Inward movement of bicarbonate via the Band 3 exchanger allows carbonic anhydrase to convert it to CO_{2} for expiration.

The chloride shift may also regulate the affinity of hemoglobin for oxygen through the chloride ion acting as an allosteric effector.

== Reaction ==
Reaction (as it occurs in the pulmonary capillaries)

   RBC                 PLASMA

   HCO3–  <-- <-- <--    HCO3–
 
   K+                   Na+

   Cl− --> --> --> -->  Cl−

Bicarbonate in the red blood cell (RBC) exchanging with chloride from plasma in the lungs.

The underlying properties creating the chloride shift are the presence of carbonic anhydrase within the RBCs but not the plasma, and the permeability of the RBC membrane to carbon dioxide and bicarbonate ion but not to hydrogen ion. Continuous process of carbonic acid dissociation and outflow of bicarbonate ions would eventually lead to a change of intracellular electric potential because of lasting H^{+} ions. Inflow of chloride ions maintains electrical neutrality of a cell. The net direction of bicarbonate-chloride exchange (bicarbonate out of RBCs in the systemic capillaries, bicarbonate into RBCs at pulmonary capillaries) proceeds in the direction that decreases the sum of the electrochemical potentials for the chloride and bicarbonate ions being transported.
