= Noordhollands Dagblad =

Dutch newspaper

- Type: Daily
- Owner: Mediahuis
- Publisher: T. Klein, M. Moos
- Editor: Hugo Schneider
- Language: Dutch
- Headquarters: Edisonweg 10, Alkmaar, Netherlands
- Circulation: 155,000 (2001)
- Website: noordhollandsdagblad.nl

Noordhollands Dagblad (NHD) is a Dutch newspaper covering North Holland in the northwest of the country. It appears in eight regional editions:

Newspaper	Editorial seat	Earliest predecessor	Started
Alkmaarsche Courant	Alkmaar	Noord-Hollandsche Courant	1796‑12‑14
Dagblad Kennemerland	Beverwijk	Nieuws- en Advertentieblad Kennemerland	1873-10-04
Dagblad Waterland	Purmerend	Nieuwe Noordhollandse Courant	1945
Dagblad voor West-Friesland	Hoorn	Vrĳe Hoornse Courant: dagblad voor West-Friesland	1945
Dagblad Zaanstreek	Zaandam	De Zaanlander (merged with De Typhoon)	1886
Enkhuizer Courant	Hoorn		1870
Helderse Courant	Den Helder	' t Vliegend Blaadje	1873-01-11
Schager Courant	Schagen	Algemeen Nieuws-, Advertentie- en Landbouwblad	1857-10-01

Noordhollands Dagblad employed in 2010 some 150 journalists.
