= De Zaanlander =

Dutch newspaper

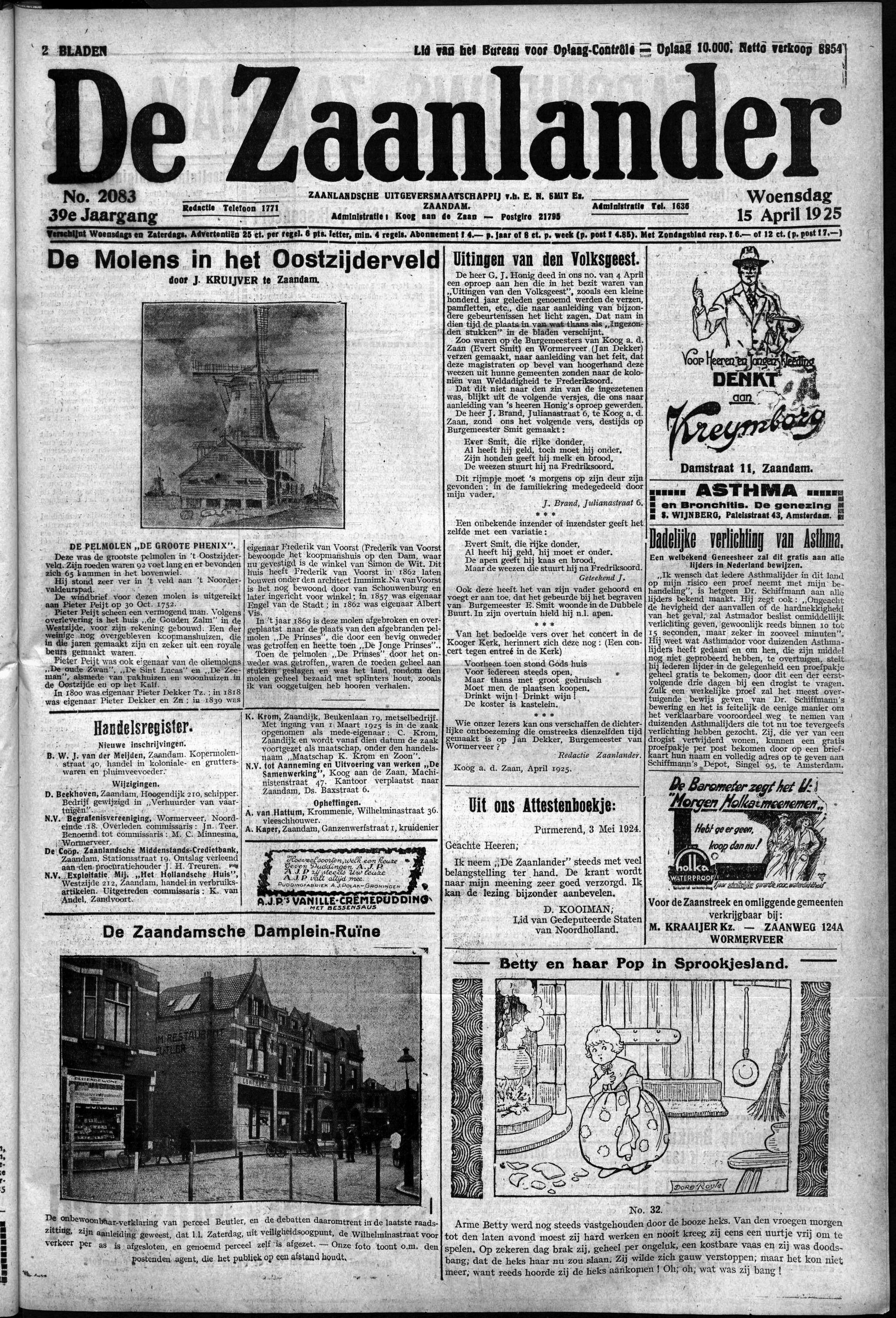
Frontpage edition April 15, 1925

De Zaanlander was a Dutch regional newspaper published in Zaandam founded in 1885. With a brief interruption after World War II, when the paper was temporarily banned for having collaborated with the German occupier, it was published until 1992, when it merged with the competing local paper, De Typhoon, to become Dagblad Zaanstreek, which in turn merged with other regional papers to form the Noordhollands Dagblad, now the only regional newspaper for North Holland.

== History ==
The paper was first published on 13 November 1885 as a periodical advertising paper in Wormerveer. In 1926 it absorbed the Zaanlandsch nieuws- en advertentieblad, a weekly for news and advertising. From 16 February 1938 it was published as a daily, and at the time was said to have some 18,000 readers.

During World War II, De Zaanlander had collaborated with the German occupation, and on 4 May 1942 was merged with four other local papers from the region to form Dagblad voor Noord-Holland, under German editorial control. After liberation it was banned from publishing, until 23 September 1946. Also in 1946, De Zaanlander is one of the co-founders of the group Verenigde Noordhollandse Dagbladen (VND), a group which will later become part of the Hollandse Dagbladcombinatie, part of the Telegraaf Media Group and responsible for the publication of the Noordhollands Dagblad.

De Zaanlander was published until February 1992, when it merged with De Typhoon, which had been founded by the local Catholic group of the Dutch resistance in 1944—the irony of this was not lost on some of De Typhoon's editors. The merger was motivated by economical concerns: the two papers competed for the same readership, which was not large to begin with: at the time of the merger, De Typhoon had 21,000 subscribers, and De Zaanlander had 6,500. The new paper was called Dagblad Zaanstreek, which again merged with a number of other regional papers to form the Noordhollands Dagblad.

== Notable staff ==
- Martin Bosma, reporter in the early 1970s
- Jan Prins, apprentice reporter in the early 1960s
