= Fanny Claus =

French violinist (1846– 1877)

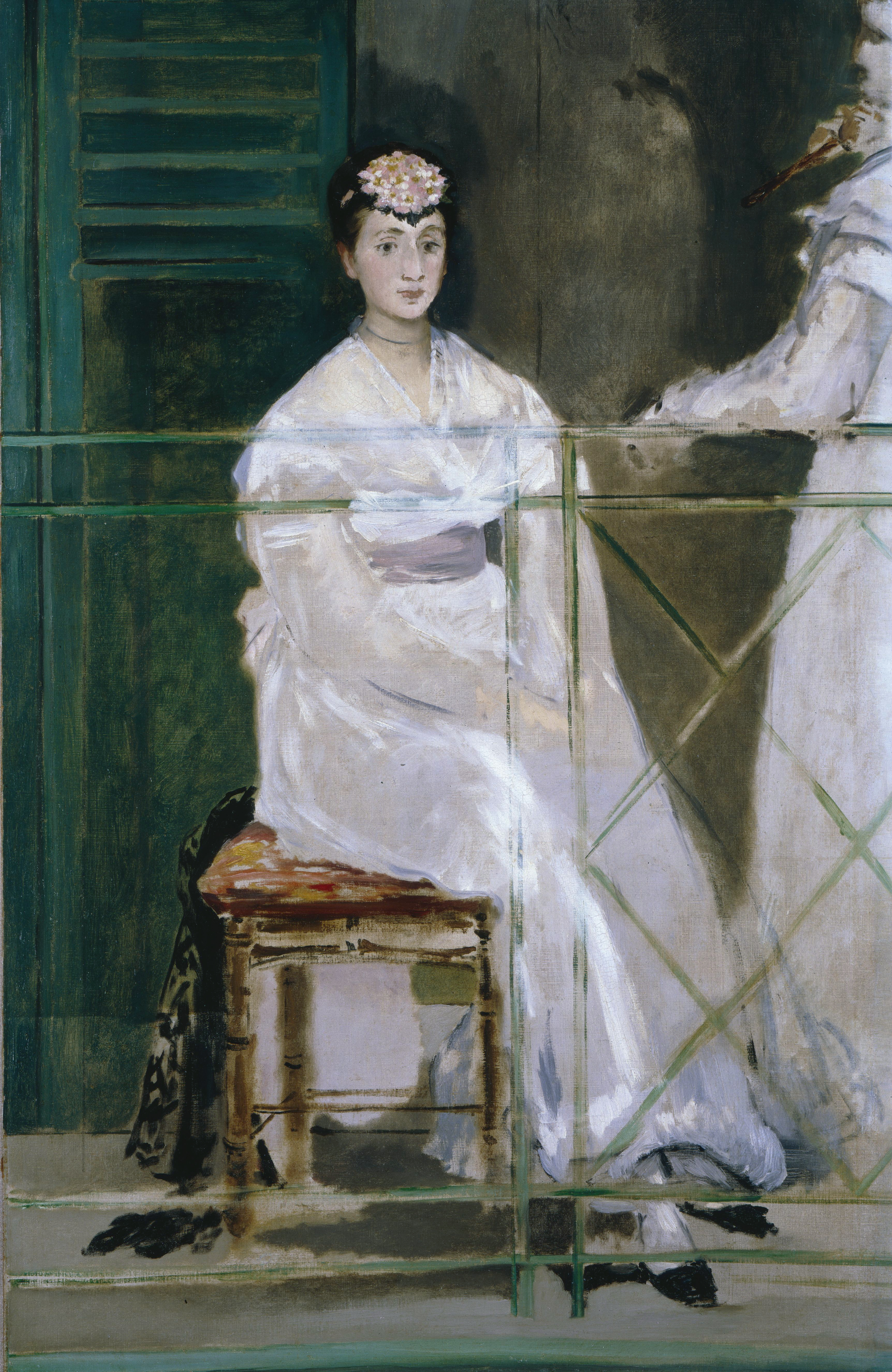
Fanny Claus

Fanny Claus (25 July 1846 – 18 April 1877), also known as Fanny Claus-Prins, was a French violinist.

== Biography ==
Fanny Claus was born on 25 July 1846 in Besançon, France. She studied violin at the Conservatoire de Paris, where she graduated in 1863. In 1866, she founded the first all-women string quartet musical group, known as Sainte-Cécile quartet.

Through her friend Suzanne Manet, pianist, wife of Édouard Manet, a French modernist painter, she met Pierre -Ernest Prins, a French painter, engraver and sculptor, whom she married in 1869. She is represented by Manet in The Balcony, a canvas exhibited in 1869.

She was the mother of Pierre Prins (1870 – 1945), a French explorer and colonial administrator.

She died on 18 April 1877 in Paris at the age of 31.
