= Johannes Martin Bijvoet =

Dutch chemist and crystallographer

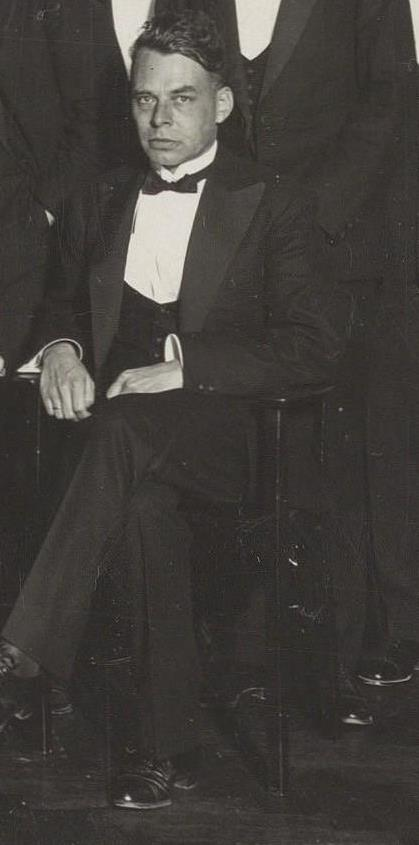
- J. M. Bijvoet in 1931
- Born: January 23, 1892; Amsterdam, Netherlands
- Died: March 4, 1980 (aged 88); Winterswijk, Netherlands
- Education: University of Amsterdam
- Known for: Bijvoet pair Anomalous X-ray scattering
- Scientific career
- Institutions: Utrecht University
- Doctoral advisor: Andreas Smits
- Notable students: Carolina Henriette MacGillavry

Johannes Martin Bijvoet ForMemRS (23 January 1892, Amsterdam – 4 March 1980, Winterswijk) was a Dutch chemist and crystallographer at the van 't Hoff Laboratory at Utrecht University. He is famous for devising a method of establishing the absolute configuration of molecules. In 1946, he became member of the Royal Netherlands Academy of Arts and Sciences.

The concept of tetrahedrally bound carbon in organic compounds stems back to the work by van 't Hoff and Le Bel in 1874. At this time, it was impossible to assign the absolute configuration of a molecule by means other than referring to the projection formula established by Fischer, who had used glyceraldehyde as the prototype and assigned randomly its absolute configuration.

In 1949 Bijvoet outlined his principle, which relies on the anomalous dispersion of X-ray radiation. Instead of the normally observed elastic scattering of X-rays when they hit an atom, which generates a scattered wave of the same energy but with a shift in phase, X-ray radiation near the absorption edge of an atom creates a partial ionisation process. Some new X-ray radiation is generated from the inner electron shells of the atoms. The X-ray radiation already being scattered is interfered with by the new radiation, both amplitude and phase being altered. These additional contributions to the scattering may be written as a real part $\Delta$f' and an imaginary one, $\Delta$f". Whereas the real part is either positive or negative, the imaginary is always positive, resulting in an addition to the phase angle.

In 1951, using an X-ray tube with a zirconium target, Bijvoet and his coworkers Peerdeman and van Bommel achieved the first experimental determination of the absolute configuration of sodium rubidium tartrate. In this compound, rubidium atoms were the ones close to the absorption edge. In their later publication in Nature, entitled "Determination of the absolute configuration of optically active compounds by means of X-rays", the authors conclude that:

"The result is that Emil Fisher's convention, which assigned the configuration of FIG. 2 to the dextrorotatory acid appears to answer the reality."

thus confirming the preceding decades of stereochemical assignments. The determination of absolute configuration is nowadays achieved using "soft" X-ray radiation, most often generated with a copper target (which generates X-rays with a characteristic wavelength of 154 pm). Shorter wavelengths make the observable differences in measured intensities smaller, thereby making the distinction of absolute configuration more difficult. The measurement of absolute configuration is also facilitated by the presence of atoms heavier than oxygen.

X-ray diffraction is still considered the ultimate proof of absolute structure, but other techniques such as circular dichroism spectroscopy are often used as faster alternatives.

== Bijvoet Centre ==
The Bijvoet Centre for Biomolecular Research at Utrecht University, which was founded in 1988, was named after him. The Bijvoet Centre performs research on the relation between the structure and function of biomolecules, including proteins and lipids, which play a role in biological processes such as regulation, interaction and recognition. The Bijvoet Centre maintains advanced infrastructures for the analysis of proteins using NMR, electron microscopy, X-ray crystallography and mass spectrometry.

== Bibliography ==
- Bijvoet, J. M; Kolkmeyer, N. H; MacGillavry, Caroline H; Furth, H. Littman (1951). X-ray analysis of crystals. London: Butterworths. OCLC 848665263.
- Bijvoet, J. M. (1969). Early papers on diffraction of X-rays by crystals. W. G. Burgers, Gunnar Hägg, International Union of Crystallography. Utrecht: Published for the International Union of Crystallography by A. Oosthoek. ISBN 90-6046-585-7. OCLC 96449.
- Early Papers on Diffraction of X-rays by Crystals. Volume 2. J. M. Bijvoet, W. G. Burgers, G. Hägg. Boston, MA: Springer US. 1972. ISBN 978-1-4615-6878-0. OCLC 840286179.
- Korte inleiding tot de chemische thermodynamica. J.M. Bijvoet, A.F. Peerdeman, Abraham Schuijff (4e dr ed.). Groningen: H.D. Tjeenk Willink. 1973. ISBN 90-01-07850-8. OCLC 63423474.
