= Prin (disambiguation) =

Prin is a Greek weekly newspaper.

Prin or PRIN may also refer to

== People ==
- Alice Prin (1901–1953), known as Kiki de Montparnasse, French artist model, nightclub singer, actress, memoirist, and painter
- Pancho Prin (1930–2003), Venezuelan musician, singer, and composer
- Yves Prin (born 1933), French composer and conductor of classical music
- Prin Goonchorn (born 1995), Thai football goalkeeper
- Prin Suparat (born 1990), also known as Mark Prin, Thai actor and model

== Other uses ==
- Revolutionary Party of the Nationalist Left (Partido Revolucionario de la Izquierda Nacionalista or PRIN), a left-wing political party in Bolivia
- Novice Prin, a fictional Catkind, who was killed in the God Complex in Doctor Who (The God Complex)

== See also ==
- Partido Renovador (PREN), a Panamanian right liberal political party
- Prins (disambiguation)
- Printz (disambiguation)
- Serzy-et-Prin, a commune in the Marne department in north-eastern France
