= Ageeth Scherphuis =

Dutch journalist (1933–2012)

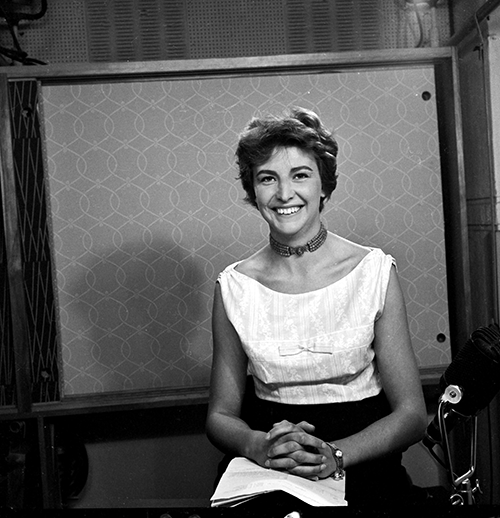
- Scherphuis in 1957
- Born: Alberta Geertruida Scherphuis; 30 March 1933; Zaandam, Noord-Holland, Netherlands
- Died: 6 April 2012 (aged 79); Amsterdam, Noord-Holland, Netherlands
- Occupations: Editorial assistant Newspaper reporter Television announcer Television presenter/moderator Programme maker Women's rights activist
- Spouse(s): Johannes Coenraad "Hans" de Wolff (1931-1959); Bert Sprenkeling (1934-2012)
- Children: Egbert Antoine de Wolff (1959-1960) and a daughter by her second marriage

Ageeth Scherphuis (30 March 1933 – 16 April 2012) was a Dutch journalist who broke into television, initially as an announcer. She went on to work in children's television. Subsequently she worked as a television reporter, moderator, commentator and programme maker, achieving a number of significant "firsts for a woman" in the process. In her later career she used her fame to become an articulate advocate for feminist causes. Posthumously it is both for her television work and as an influential women's rights advocate that she is remembered and, by admirers, celebrated.

== Biography ==
=== Provenance and early years ===
Alberta Geertruida "Ageeth" Scherphuis was born, the elder of her parents' two daughters, at Zaandam, a commercially dynamic town with a rich maritime history. Frederik Johannes Jan Scherphuis (1905-1989), her father, was a successful dentist. The family was prosperous. Neeltje Elisabeth Laban (1907-1994), her mother worked as practice manager for her husband. Despite the curse of National Socialist occupation between 1940 and 1944/45, the girls' childhood was relatively comfortable. Personal tragedy nevertheless intervened in 1944, when their only brother was born and, shortly afterwards, died.

Between 1939 and 1945 "Ageetje" (as she was known within the family at this time) attended junior school. When she was 11 her father arranged for her to undergo an "intelligence test", which produced the verdict that she had "very good language skills". She spent three years as a pupil at the local "Zaanlands Lyceum" (secondary school) and then transferred to the "Middelbare meisjesschool" / "MMS" (literally but misleadingly "Girls' Middle School") at Bergen, in the south of the country. She was still only 17 in 1950 when she passed the exams signalling completion of her school-level education. She went on to study at the "Hogere Hotelvakschool" the Hague, but broke off the course without completing it having decided, as she disclosed in a newspaper interview some year later, that she was "too independent" for a career in hotels and catering management. She nevertheless went on to take a year in England, working in a hotel, in order to improve her spoken English. That was followed by a lengthy stay in France where she worked as an au pair, looking after the five children of a family of aristocrats. Although at least Dutch language translation by Scherphuis of an English language children's book was published, it was not directly through her foreign language skills that Ageeth Scherphuis made her way in life. Instead, by 1953 she had decided to pursue a career as a journalist.

=== Regional newspaper reporter ===
That year joined the Zaandam-based regional newspaper De Typhoon, with which she worked till 1956. The editor-in-chief shared in the widespread view that being both a woman and a journalist at the same time was problematic: Scherphuis joined as an editorial assistant. She persisted, however, submitting for publication a report on the placement of a new rooster-figure on the church tower at Zaandam. During the rest of her time with De Typhoon she produced contributions on an eclectic mix of topics, amply demonstrating her journalistic aptitude. She herself would later describe journalism as "a sort of addiction" ("een soort verslaving").

=== Television and marriage ===
During the summer of 1956 Scherphuis was sent by her editor to report on a selection meeting being organised by AVRO who were looking for a replacement television announcer to take the place - possibly on a temporary basis - of Mies Bouwman. Mies Bouwman was pregnant. Scherphuis stood out from the various applicants on account of what one admirer identified as her "chic appearance". Finding herself unexpectedly offered the position, she accepted it. On 12 September 1956, just three months after her marriage to the fighter pilot Hans de Wolff, Ageeth Scherphuis made her debut as a television announcer. She was an instant hit with viewers: this continued to amaze her through early part of her career. The veteran radio announcers and presenters Ger Lugtenburg and Siebe van der Zee declared her "a perfect announcer".

That year she became the permanent replacement for Mies Bouwman as a television announcer with AVRO. (Mies Bouwman, on returning to the television studios, also continued to enjoy a successful television career.) Scherphuis was now "the face of AVRO" and on 21 September 1967 she became the first television announcer in the Netherlands to appear on the small screen in colour. She wore a lemon-yellow dress for the occasion, which involved introducing an interview with a government minister called Leo de Block. The Minister for Economic Affairs had apparently not planned for the technological advance with such care: his uncompromisingly dark grey suit attracted comment.

Following her 1956 breakthrough into television Scherphuis quickly tired of appearing on the small screen simply an announcer. She was keen to expand her television career: but that was not easy. In 1984 she would tell an interviewer: "I was there because of how I looked, and there was not much more for me to do. In retrospect, I figured that became the basis for my feminism". (Note: "Ik was daar vanwege mijn uiterlijk en iets anders viel er niet te doen. Ik denk achteraf dat daar de basis ligt voor mijn feminisme".) She nevertheless found ways to expand the range of her work. She continued to write reports for De Typhoon and other periodical publications. Between 1958 and 1960 she regularly featured on the role of "Announcer Ageeth" in the Mies Bouhuys television series for children, "Varen is fijner dan je denkt" (loosely, "Sailing is more fun than you think").

In 1966 Scherphuis terminated her work as an AVRO announcer. She had, she explained, had her fill of introducing gentlemen playing Hammond Organs and singing girls. She would rather work on current affairs. Her wish was granted. Between October 1966 and 1968 she presented the newly launched NTS current affairs television programme Monitor from Hilversum, alongside Philip Bloemendal. Involvement in more television productions followed. These included the news programme "Scala" and arts-culture programmes such as "Kunstgrepen" and "Uit de kunst". During the 1970s she was increasingly involved not just fronting television programmes, but also in making and producing them.

=== Feminism ===
As one of the best known faces on television, Scherphuis was now able to use her experience and status as a journalist and television personality to promote public debate on questions of sexuality, abortion rights and gender equality in the work place. In this she was, according to at least one commentator, ahead of her time. The programme "Dames gaan voor" ("Ladies go first") which she made in 1973 for the NOS was quickly withdrawn due to poor viewing figures. She enjoyed far greater success with "Ot....en hoe zit het nou met Sien?", which ran from 1975 till 1982, and in which she discussed "tricky women's issues". Jan de Troye, who commissioned the series on behalf of the NOS, was a man: all the journalists and programme makers involved were female, however. At its 1975 launch the series consisted of a succession of themed report programmes, but over time the format became less rigid: after 1978 it became in effect a studio-based discussion show with guests and an invited audience. Scherphuis herself saw the series as an important turning point in the on-going debate on women's rights: "In my opinion we set something rolling with it: thoughtful consideration about the situation and position of women".

Between 1979 and 1983 Scherphuis was also involved with the feminist (and according to some commentators left-wing) opinion magazine, "Serpentine". After the conclusion of the seven year run achieved by the "Ot....en hoe zit het nou met Sien?" series, in 1982 Scherphuis became a contributing editor with Vrij Nederland, a rather serious and intellectual centre-left news and culture magazine, then under the direction of the charismatic Joop van Tijn. Her contributions ranged widely, with particular emphasis on "women's questions", welfare issues and the German occupation which, a generation after its ending, continued to resonate powerfully, especially with those who had lived through it. She teamed up with Anita van Ommeren to compile a detailed study for the magazine of the Dutch resistance hero Gerrit van der Veen. Although the balance of her career had tilted back towards the print media after 1982, she continued to work on television projects as well. Between 1984 and 1989 she was both a researcher and an interviewer for "Kwartslag", a bold and somewhat experimental discussion series transmitted on behalf of the Humanist Association. Scherphuis retired, formally, in 1998, but continued to contribute to Vrij Nederland on a freelance basis for two more years.

In 2009, possibly as an indication that mainstream opinion had moved a little closer to some of the social and political causes for which she had campaigned, Scherphuis was appointed a Knight of the Order of Orange-Nassau.

On 16 April 2012, following several months of illness, Ageeth Scherphuis died at Amsterdam.

== Personal ==
The first marriage of Ageeth Scherphuis was cut brutally short, and was followed by a tragic aftermath. Hans de Wolff (1931-1959), whom she married at Zaandam on 30 June 1956, was a fighter pilot in the Royal Dutch Navy. On 30 September 1959 he was killed close to the coast at Noordwijk when his Hawker Sea Jet FGA50 crashed over the North Sea. Scherphuis continued to live in Zaandam with Egbert, the couple's infant son. Less than a year after her husband's death, however, the child drowned on 22 August 1960 in the Balkenhaven at Zaandam, where "‘t Hemeltje", the family's houseboat, was moored.

The year after death of her son by her first marriage Scherphuis remarried, on 15 July 1961. Bert Sprenkeling (1934-2012), her second husband was a newspaper photographer with the centre-left daily newspaper Amsterdam-based newspaper, Het Parool. Scherphuis relocated the short distance from Zaandam, and the couple made their home near the Rijksmuseum in south-central Amsterdam. By the time the marriage was dissolved, on 16 July 1969, it had been blessed through the birth of the couple's daughter.

While she was working on Monitor Scherphuis embarked on a serious affair with Joop van Tijn. Both were married to other people, but in approximately 1968 they both effectively ended their respective marriages and moved in together. "We had a fantastic time, but day and night with Joop was a constant battle of attrition", she later told an interviewer. It became apparent quite quickly that van Tijn was involved with other women while he was living with Scherphuis. She initially reconciled herself to the situation, but during the early 1980s they ended their cohabitation. In other respects the relationship with the man identified by at least one source as "her greatest love" continued for many more years. Van Tijn was still relatively young when he died in 1997. It was reported at the time that a large number of the women attending his funeral each wore an identical item of jewellery, each a gift from the deceased.
