= Louis Edmond Duranty =

French novelist and art critic (1833–1880)

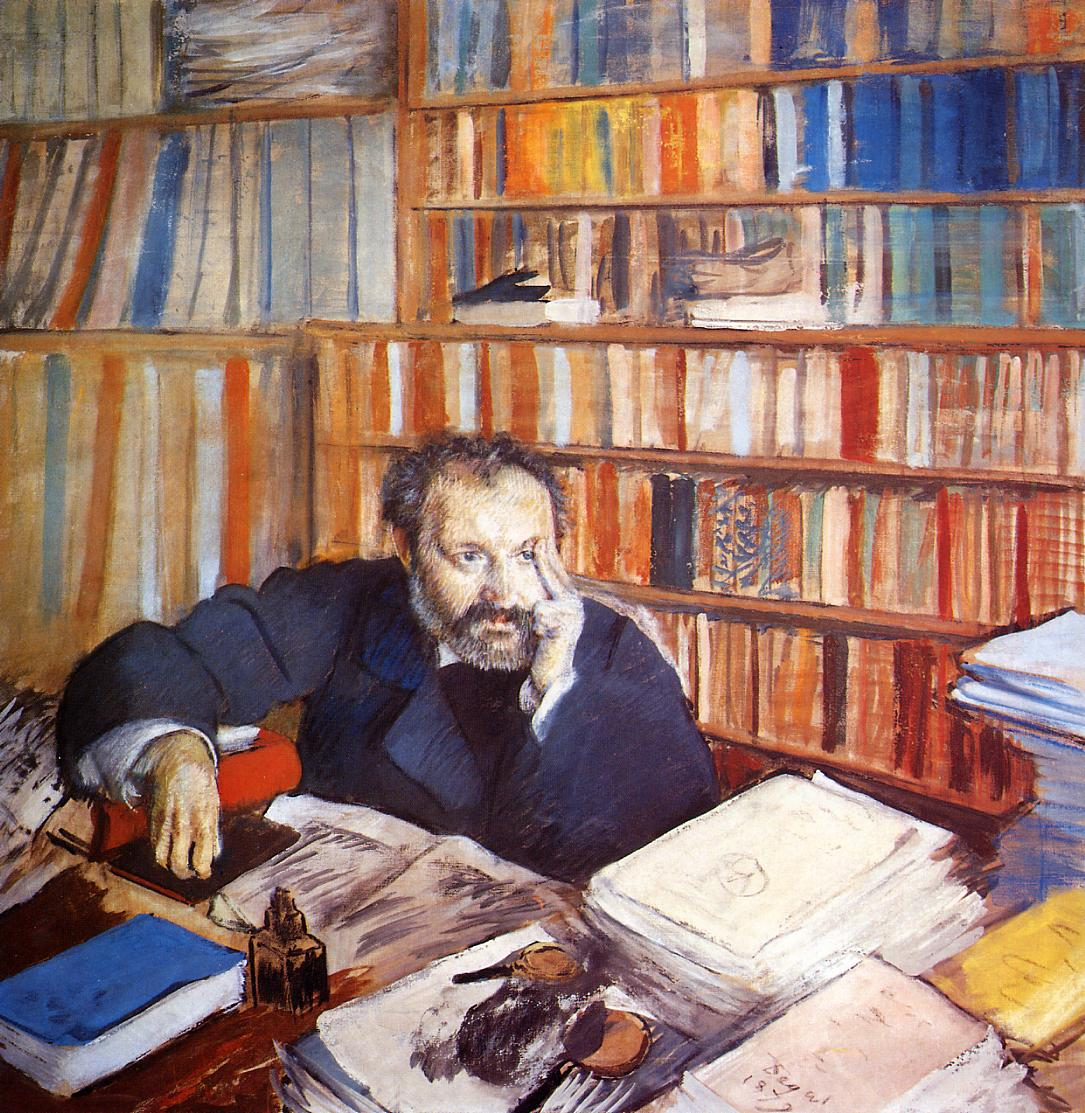
Louis Edmond Duranty; portrait by Edgar Degas, 1879.

Louis Edmond Duranty (6 June 1833 – 9 April 1880) was a prolific French novelist and art critic.

Duranty supported the realist cause and later the Impressionists. He was challenged to a duel in 1870 by Édouard Manet over an affront. He was a friend of Edgar Degas, who painted a celebrated portrait of him in 1879 (Burrell Collection, Glasgow). He was a frequent visitor to the Café Guerbois.

Duranty adopted 'truth' as the slogan of his short-lived journal Réalisme (1856–57), and in the second volume he composed principles of realism. Duranty is the author of The New Painting.
