= Jan Prins =

Dutch newspaper editor and journalist (1944–2008)

Jan Prins (14 May 1944 in Zaandam – 7 March 2008 in The Hague) was a Dutch newspaper editor and journalist.

Prins, born in Zaanstad into a communist family (his uncle was Marcus Bakker), began his journalistic career in the early 1960 as an apprentice reporter at De Zaanlander, after which he went on to work for Sijthoff in The Hague, and to become editor-in-chief of the Rotterdams Dagblad.
