= PRINS (gene) =

Non-coding RNA in the species Homo sapiens

Identifiers
- Aliases: PRINS, NCRNA00074, psoriasis associated non-protein coding RNA induced by stress
- External IDs: GeneCards: PRINS
Orthologs
Databases	NCBI: entry
Species	Human	Mouse
Entrez	100169750	n/a
Ensembl	n/a	n/a
UniProt	n a	n/a
RefSeq (mRNA)	n/a	n/a
RefSeq (protein)	n/a	n/a
Location (UCSC)	n/a	n/a
PubMed search		n/a
- Wikidata
View/Edit Human

PRINS (psoriasis associated RNA induced by stress) is a long non-coding RNA. Its expression is induced by stress, and it may have a protective role in cells exposed to stress. It is over-expressed in the skin of patients with psoriasis. It regulates G1P3, a gene encoding a protein with anti-apoptotic effects in keratinocytes. Overexpression of PRINS may contribute to psoriasis via the down-regulation of G1P3.

== See also ==
- Long noncoding RNA
