= De Typhoon =

De Typhoon: Dagblad voor de Zaanstreek
- Type: Local newspaper
- Editor: Gerrit Groot
- Founded: 12 October 1944
- Language: Dutch

De Typhoon: Dagblad voor de Zaanstreek was a Dutch regional newspaper published in Zaandam. It was founded in 1944 (during World War II) as an anti-German resistance paper, and continued after the war as a local newspaper, absorbing some smaller local papers along the way. The paper merged in 1992 with the competing local paper, De Zaanlander, to become Dagblad Zaanstreek, which in turn merged with other regional papers to form the Noordhollands Dagblad, now the only regional newspaper for the province of North Holland.

== History ==
=== World War II ===
The paper was founded during World War II by Gerrit Groot, a Roman Catholic priest active in the local resistance movement, and was first published on 12 October 1944 as a double-sided single-page newsletter. The very first version was published two days earlier under the name De Moffenzeef, "mof" being a derogatory term for "German". However, the name was deemed too provocative, and, according to legend, the paper was renamed for the Hawker Typhoon fighter-bomber, one of which happened to be flying over as the local Roman Catholic resistance group responsible for the paper was meeting. From 22 October 1944 it was published as a weekly on a mimeograph owned by a local bookstore (whose owner, Willem Brinkman, was also active in the resistance), and from December 1944 on a printing press in the building of the local Roman Catholic library. The "liberation edition" was a single sheet printed on 5 May 1945, on orange paper.

=== Post-war ===
After the war, it was published as a local newspaper, as one of the few illegal newspapers to survive the war and competition with the existing newspapers. In 1945–1946 it absorbed some local advertising publications, De Zaanstreek (for the Wormerveer region) and the Wormer en Jisper advertentieblad (for Wormer and Jisp), and the official city publication, Zaanlandsche courant. Some discussion ensued over whether the paper should remain Roman Catholic or become non-denominational, a conflict settled when editor-in-chief Erwin Baumgarten and later his brother left (in 1946 and 1948, resp.), leaving the paper in the hands of editors who had not been involved with its Roman Catholic wartime origin. Cees Meijer became editor-in-chief in 1951, and led the paper until 1979. The paper was owned and printed by Stuurman of Zaandam until 1968, when it was taken over by Damiate, also publishers of the Haarlems Dagblad; some of the editorial boards were moved to or subsumed by the Haarlem paper to the dismay of the paper's writers and editors, including Cees Meijer.

=== Merger ===
De Typhoon was published until February 1992, when it merged with the competing local paper, De Zaanlander—which had collaborated with the German occupation and had been banned from publishing after the war, until September 1946, an irony not lost on some of De Typhoon's editors. The merger was motivated by economical concerns: the two papers competed for the same readership, which was not large to begin with: at the time of the merger, De Typhoon had 21,000 subscribers, and De Zaanlander had 6,500. The new paper was called Dagblad Zaanstreek, which again merged with a number of other regional papers to form the Noordhollands Dagblad.
