= Pierre Prins =

French painter (1838–1913)

Pierre Ernest Prins
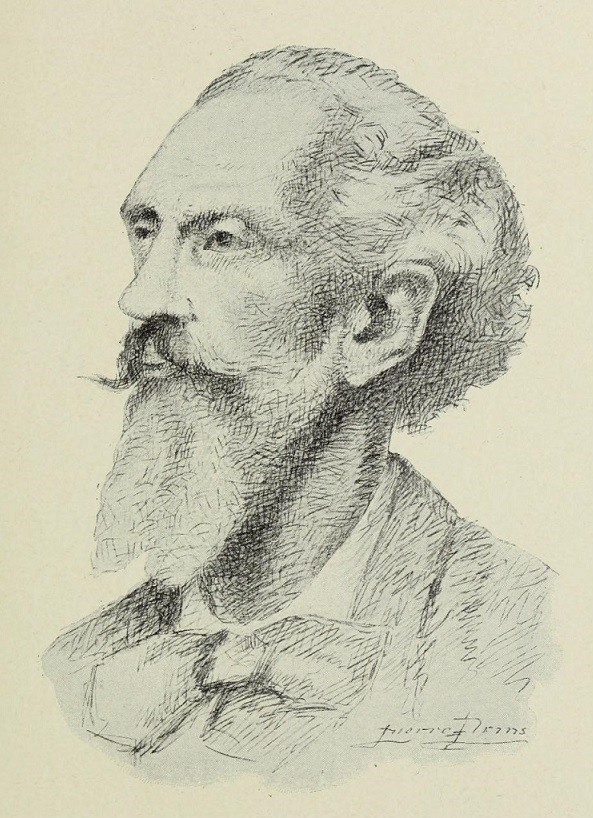
- Pierre-Ernest Prins Portrait
- Born: Ernest Pierre Joseph Prins; 26 November 1838; Paris, France
- Died: 21 January 1913 (aged 74); Paris, France
- Education: École des dessin d'arts décoratifs à Paris
- Known for: Painting, engraving
- Movement: Impressionism
- Spouse: Fanny Claus

Pierre Prins (26 November 1838 – 21 January 1913) was a French painter, engraver and sculptor.

== Biography ==
Pierre Prins was born on 26 November 1838, at the 7th arrondissement of Paris. He is the eldest son of his family. His family is a manufacturer and merchant of various goods, such as umbrellas, whips and swords. In 1851, his father disappeared in Brazil. Therefore, Mr Bourgeois, his maternal grandfather, make Prins an apprentice in his workshop. As he is passionate about sculpture, his mother suggested him to enrol an art class. He then enrolled in a school of art in 1861. His mother died in the same year.

Later he met Édouard Manet through his sister Pauline, a close friend of Manet's wife, Suzanne Leenhoff. In 1869, after he bought his maternal grandfather's workshop, he married Fanny Claus, a violinist and one of the figures in Manet's The Balcony, with Manet as a witness.

In 1871, the Paris Commune forced the couple to close their workshop. Therefore, they fled to Belgium. They returned to Paris in the next year. Yet, his wife, Fanny Claus was suffering from illness. He had to sell everything to pay the medical fee. With the help of the Manet couple in 1873, Prins can go to work.

In 1874, Prins participated in the creation of the Society of Painters, Sculptors and Engravers and decided to move to Namur with his wife. Before leaving, he sent twelve of his paintings to his childhood friend, the sculptor Émile Philippe Scailliet, so that he can hand the paintings to Alfred Sisley, who must deposit them at the workshop of Nadar for their first exhibition, which took place from 15 April 1874 to 15 May 1874. The couple later returned to Paris in 1875. In 1876, Pierre Prins restores ancient ivories for the Louvre Museum, and went to paint in the countryside on the side of Bas-Meudon, at Île Seguin. His wife, Fanny Claus-Prins, died in 1877, at the age of 31.

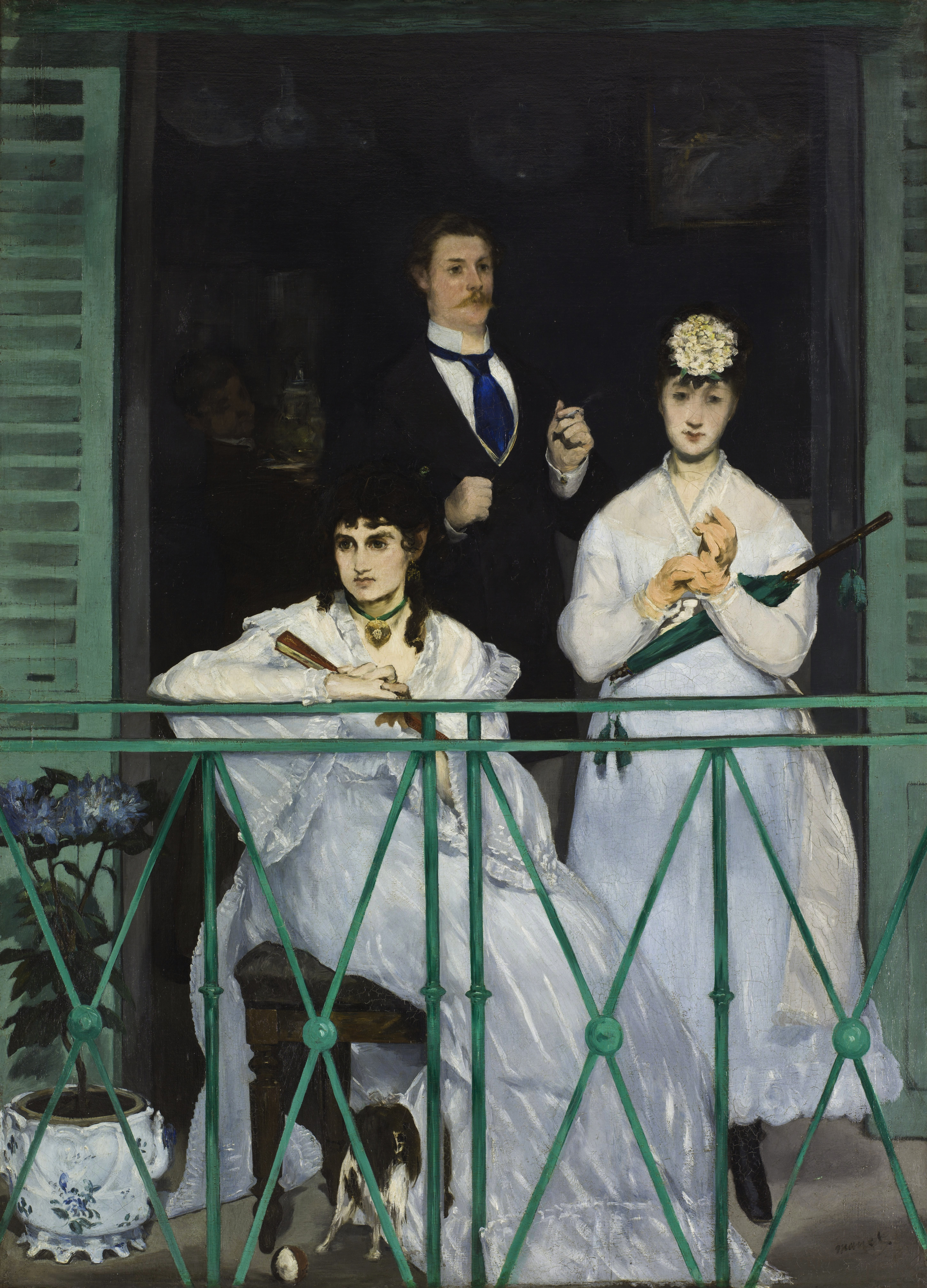
Édouard Manet, Le Balcon, (1868–1869), Paris, musée d'Orsay. On the right is the portrait of Pierre's wife, Fanny Claus-Prins.

In 1890, Prins had his first one-man exhibition of works. Other than that, his works were also exhibited regularly at different salons.

Prins died on 21 January 1913, the day before the opening of the 10th Exhibition of the Painters of Modern Paris at La Boetie gallery in Paris. He was buried at Ivry Cemetery, Ivry-sur-Seine.

== Style ==
His paintings are mainly painted by the heavy use of pastel and coarse-grained coloured paper. He is also focused in the natural landscape, leaving the urban scenery untouched.
