= Ada Prins =

Dutch chemist (1879–1977)

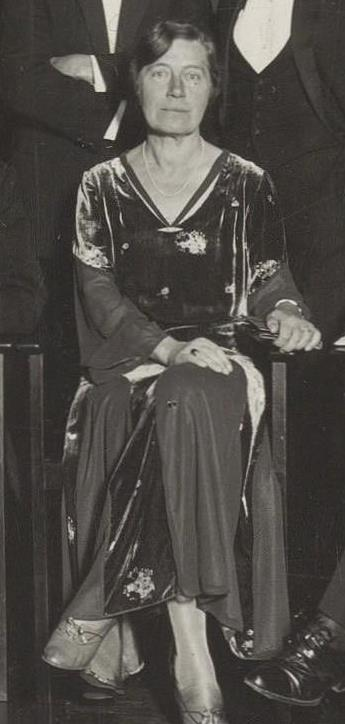
- Ada Prins in 1931
- Born: 18 September 1879; Amsterdam, Netherlands
- Died: 20 July 1977 (aged 97); Voorburg, Netherlands
- Education: University of Amsterdam
- Occupations: chemist, author
- Known for: First Dutch woman to hold a doctorate in chemistry
- Relatives: Huibert Nicolaas Prins (brother)

Ada Prins (18 September 1879 – 20 July 1977) was a Dutch chemist and became the first woman in the Netherlands to earn a PhD. in chemistry in 1908. She was a high school teacher for thirty years at the lyceum, and was later appointed as a lecturer at the University of Leiden. She is known for writing chemistry textbooks on organic and inorganic chemistry, and quantitative analysis.

== Biography ==
Prins obtained her doctorate from the University of Amsterdam under the supervision of Richard Roland Holst, with the thesis Vloeiende mengkristallen in binaire stelsels (Liquid mixed crystals in binary systems). She taught for thirty years in high school and at the lyceum, and was appointed as a lecturer at the University of Leiden.

She went on to enhance her reputation by writing chemistry textbooks. Together with the engineer Grada P. de Groot, she wrote Guidelines for inorganic and organic chemistry with its application in industry and household. In 1935, the second edition was published by Nijgh & van Ditmar NV Rotterdam. She also wrote the Brief Guidelines for Qualitative Chemical Analysis, published by Scheltema & Holkema's Boekhandel and Uitgeverers-mij NV – Amsterdam. In 1952, the last and seventh improved edition was published.

== Personal life ==
Prins was known to have had a friendly intellectual and romantic relationship with Dutch poet and socialist Herman Gorter (1864–1927) starting in 1901. According to Zwart,

Whereas Ada Prins is mostly remembered as one of Gorter's secret lovers, she was first and foremost his educated guide into the complex and enigmatic world of twentieth-century chemistry research. Liquid crystal chemistry became an important source of inspiration for Gorter's work and the main objective of this paper is to demonstrate her influence on Gorter's Pan as a scientific poem.

Her brother was the shipbuilder and engineer Huibert Nicolaas Prins. At his funeral in 1939 she spoke on behalf of the family.

== Selected works ==
- Prins, Ada. "Flüssige Mischkristalle in binären Systemen." Zeitschrift für physikalische Chemie 67.1 (1909): 689-723.
- Prins, A. "Critical phenomena of the ternary system ether anthraquinone-naphthalene." KNAW, Proceedings. Vol. 13. 1910.
- Büchner, Ε. H., and Ada Prins. "Löslichkeit und Lösungswärme von Chromtrioxyd in Wasser." Zeitschrift für Physikalische Chemie 81.1 (1913): 113-120.
- Prins, A. "On critical end-points and the systems ethane naphtalene [sic]." KNAW, Proceedings. Vol. 17. 1915.
- Büchner, E. H., and A. Prins. "Vapour pressures in the system: carbon disulphide-methylalcohol." KNAW, Proceedings. Vol. 19. 1917.
- Prins, Ada, and Grada P. de Groot. Leidraad voor de anorganische en organische scheikunde met toepassingen in industrie en huishouding. Nijgh & van Ditmar, 1927.
- Prins, Ada. "Sur la Difficulté D'obtenir une Idée du Mécanisme D'une Réaction par la Détermination de la Vitesse." Recueil des Travaux Chimiques des Pays-Bas 51.6 (1932): 576-578.
