= De Prins der Geïllustreerde Bladen =

Dutch magazine

De Prins der Geïllustreerde Bladen, issue of 5 September 1908

De Prins der Geïllustreerde Bladen (abbreviated as De Prins, in English: The Prince of the Illustrated Magazines) was a Dutch magazine which was published between 1901 and 1948. The magazine contained many photos, reviews and serials (such as those by Arthur Conan Doyle). There were also personal details and obituaries of important people in the magazine.

The magazine was published by Uitgeverij N.J. Boon from Amsterdam. The publisher and director was N.J. Boon.
