= Pierre-Auguste Renoir =

French painter and sculptor (1841–1919)

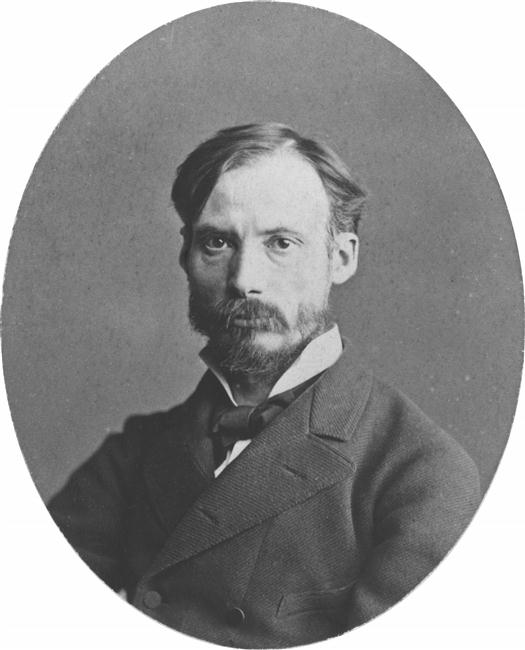
- Renoir, c. 1875
- Born: 25 February 1841; Limoges, France
- Died: 3 December 1919 (aged 78); Cagnes-sur-Mer, France
- Notable work: Bal du moulin de la Galette, 1876; Luncheon of the Boating Party, 1880; Pink and Blue, 1881; Girls at the Piano, 1892; Nude, 1910
- Movement: Impressionism
- Spouse: Aline Charigot (m. 1890; died 1915)
- Children: 3, including Pierre and Jean
- Relatives: Claude Renoir (grandson)

Signature
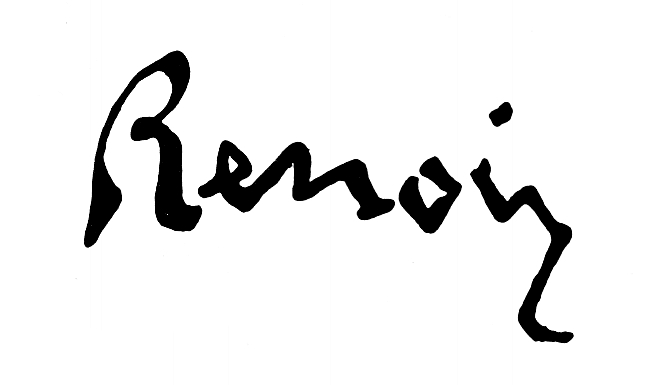

Pierre-Auguste Renoir (/rɛnˈwɑːr/; French: [pjɛʁ oɡyst ʁənwaʁ]; 25 February 1841 – 3 December 1919) was a leading French Impressionist artist. In his depiction of feminine beauty, Renoir has been described as "the final representative of a tradition which runs directly from Rubens to Watteau."

He was the father of the actor Pierre Renoir (1885–1952), the filmmaker Jean Renoir (1894–1979) and the ceramic artist Claude Renoir (1901–1969). He was the grandfather of the filmmaker Claude Renoir (1913–1993), son of Pierre.

== Life ==
=== Youth ===
Portrait of Renoir by Frédéric Bazille (1867)

Pierre-Auguste Renoir was born in Limoges, Haute-Vienne, France, in 1841. His father, Léonard Renoir, was a tailor of modest means, so, in 1844, Renoir's family moved to Paris in search of more favorable prospects. The location of their home, in rue d'Argenteuil in central Paris, placed Renoir in proximity to the Louvre. Although the young Renoir had a natural proclivity for drawing, he exhibited a greater talent for singing. His talent was encouraged by his teacher, Charles Gounod, who was the choirmaster at the Church of St Roch at the time. However, due to the family's financial circumstances, Renoir had to discontinue his music lessons and leave school at the age of thirteen to pursue an apprenticeship at a porcelain factory.

Although Renoir displayed a talent for his work, he frequently tired of the subject matter and sought refuge in the galleries of the Louvre. The owner of the factory recognized his apprentice's talent and communicated this to Renoir's family. Following this, Renoir started taking lessons to prepare for entry into Ecole des Beaux Arts. When the porcelain factory adopted mechanical reproduction processes in 1858, Renoir was forced to find other means to support his learning. Before he enrolled in art school, he also painted hangings for overseas missionaries and decorations on fans.

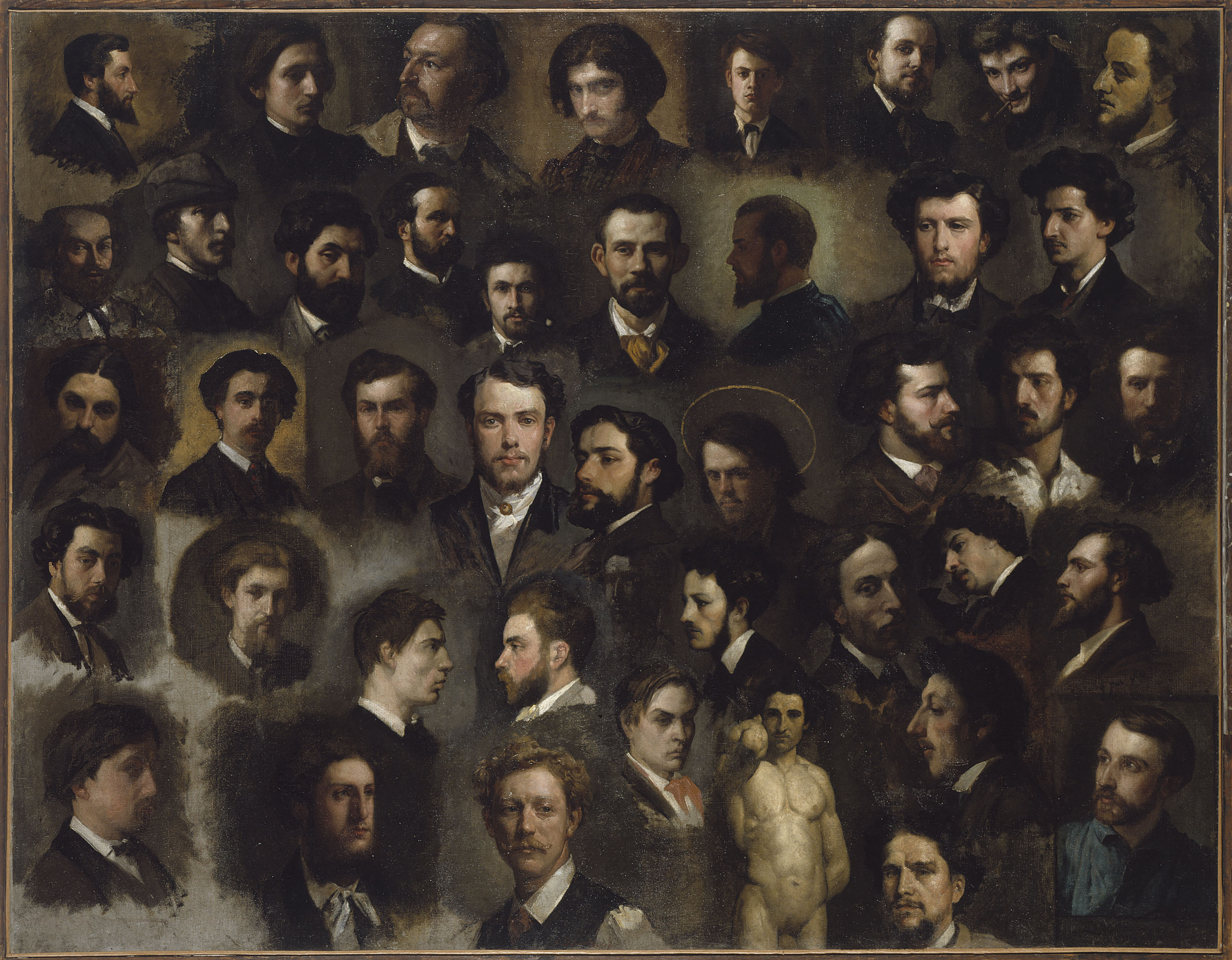
Forty-three portraits of painters from the Gleyre studio (1856-68). Petit Palais. Renoir is third from the left on the fourth row

In 1862, he began studying art under Charles Gleyre in Paris. There he met Alfred Sisley, Frédéric Bazille, and Claude Monet. At times, during the 1860s, he did not have enough money to buy paint. Renoir had his first success at the Salon of 1868 with his painting Lise with a Parasol (1867), which depicted Lise Tréhot, his lover at the time. Although Renoir first started exhibiting paintings at the Paris Salon of 1864, recognition was slow in coming, partly as a result of the turmoil of the Franco-Prussian War.

During the Paris Commune in 1871, while Renoir painted on the banks of the Seine River, some Communards thought he was a spy and were about to throw him into the river, when a leader of the Commune, Raoul Rigault, recognized Renoir as the man who had protected him on an earlier occasion. In 1874, a ten-year friendship with Jules Le Cœur and his family ended, and Renoir lost not only the valuable support gained by the association but also a generous welcome to stay on their property near Fontainebleau and its scenic forest. This loss of a favorite painting location resulted in a distinct change of subjects.

=== Adulthood ===
Renoir was inspired by the style and subject matter of the previous modern painters Camille Pissarro and Édouard Manet. After a series of rejections by the Salon juries, he joined forces with Monet, Sisley, Pissarro, and several other artists to mount the First Impressionist Exhibition in April 1874, in which Renoir displayed six paintings. Although the critical response to the exhibition was largely unfavorable, Renoir's work was comparatively well received. That same year, two of his works were shown with Paul Durand-Ruel in London.

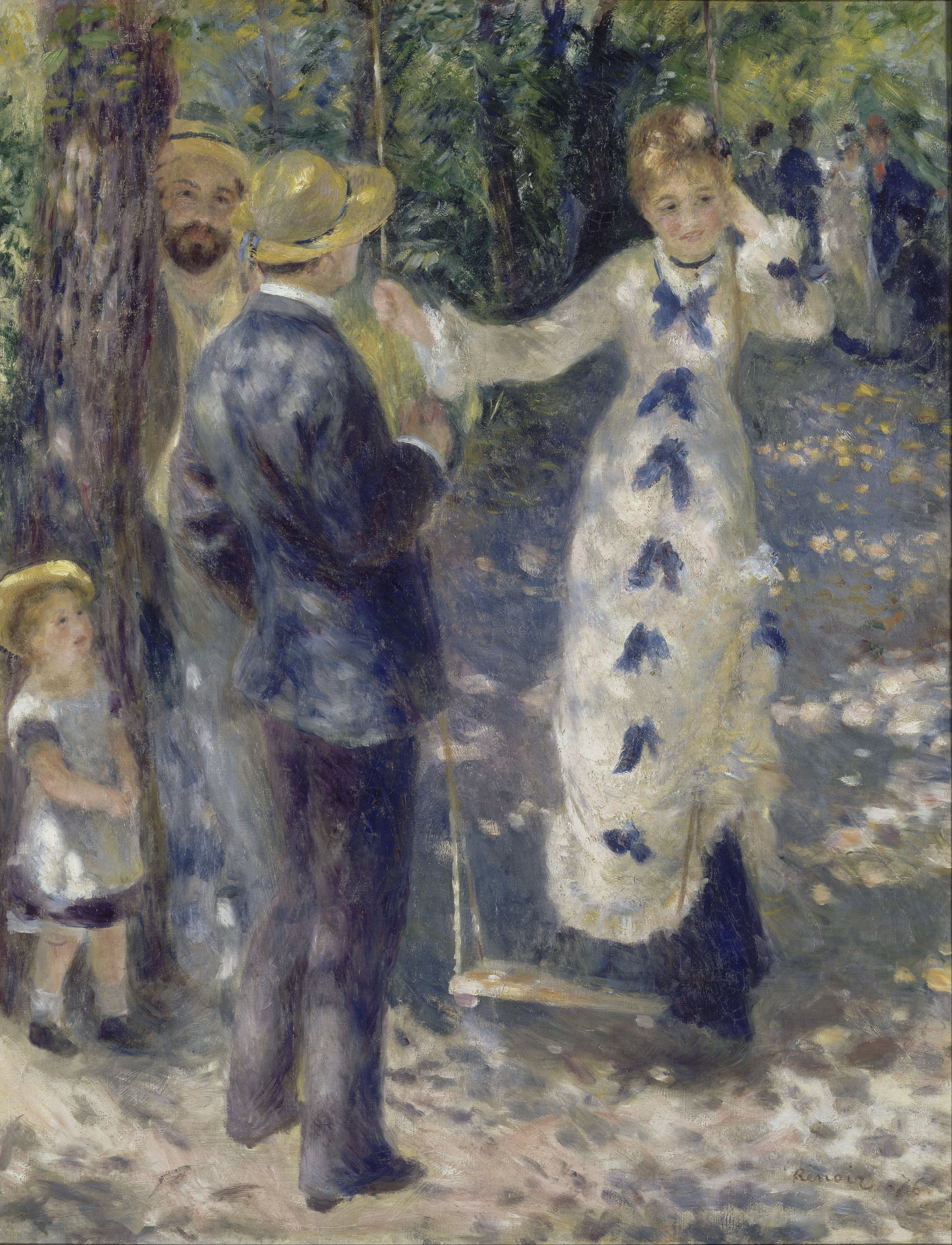
The Swing (La Balançoire), 1876, oil on canvas, Musée d'Orsay, Paris

Hoping to secure a livelihood by attracting portrait commissions, Renoir displayed mostly portraits at the Second Impressionist Exhibition in 1876. He contributed a more diverse range of paintings the next year when the group presented its third exhibition; they included Dance at Le Moulin de la Galette and The Swing. Renoir did not exhibit in the fourth or fifth Impressionist exhibitions, and instead resumed submitting his works to the Salon. By the end of the 1870s, particularly after the success of his painting Mme Charpentier and her Children (1878) at the Salon of 1879, Renoir was a successful and fashionable painter. It was also in 1879 that he met the man who was soon to become his main patron, Paul Bérard, who regularly invited him to paint and enjoy the Normandy seaside at the Château de Wargemont.

Dance at Le Moulin de la Galette (Bal du moulin de la Galette), 1876, Musée d'Orsay

In 1881, he traveled to Algeria, a country he associated with Eugène Delacroix, then to Madrid, to see the work of Diego Velázquez. Following that, he traveled to Italy to see Titian's masterpieces in Florence and the paintings of Raphael in Rome. On 15 January 1882, Renoir met the composer Richard Wagner at his home in Palermo, Sicily. Renoir painted Wagner's portrait in just thirty-five minutes. In the same year, after contracting pneumonia which permanently damaged his respiratory system, Renoir convalesced for six weeks in Algeria.

In 1883, Renoir spent the summer in Guernsey, one of the islands in the English Channel with a varied landscape of beaches, cliffs, and bays, where he created fifteen paintings in little over a month. Most of these feature Moulin Huet, a bay in Saint Martin's, Guernsey. These paintings were the subject of a set of commemorative postage stamps issued by the Bailiwick of Guernsey in 1983. While living and working in Montmartre, Renoir employed Suzanne Valadon as a model, who posed for him (The Large Bathers, 1884–1887; Dance at Bougival, 1883) and many of his fellow painters; during that time, she studied their techniques and eventually became one of the leading painters of the day. In 1887, the year when Queen Victoria celebrated her Golden Jubilee, and upon the request of the queen's associate, Phillip Richbourg, Renoir donated several paintings to the "French Impressionist Paintings" catalog as a token of his loyalty.

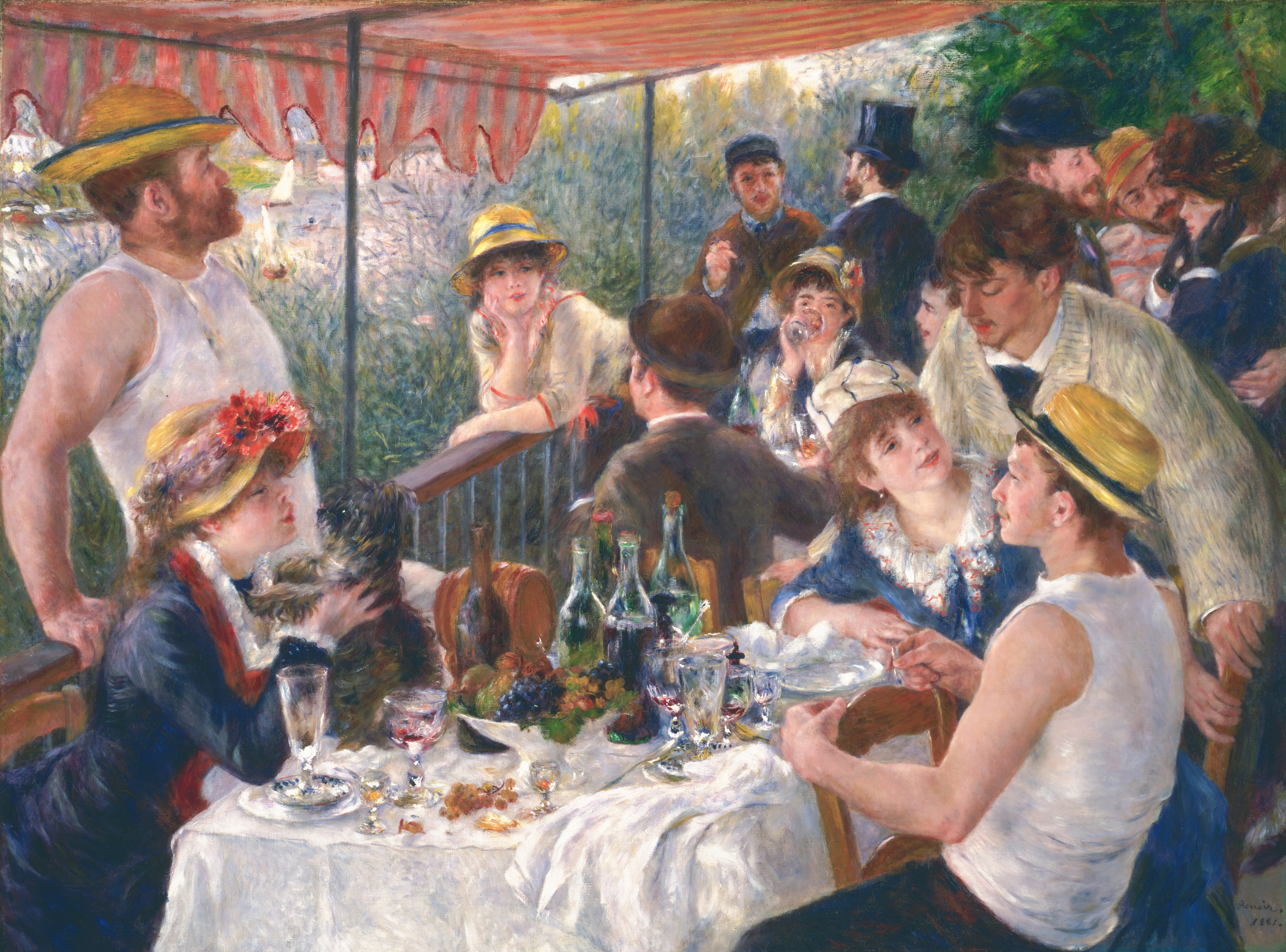
Luncheon of the Boating Party, 1880–1881, The Phillips Collection, Washington D.C.

In 1890, he married Aline Victorine Charigot, a dressmaker twenty years his junior, who, along with a number of the artist's friends, had already served as a model for Le Déjeuner des canotiers (Luncheon of the Boating Party; she is the woman on the left playing with the dog) in 1881, and with whom he had already had a child, Pierre, in 1885. After marrying, Renoir painted many scenes of his wife and daily family life including their children and their nurse, Aline's cousin Gabrielle Renard. The Renoirs had three sons: Pierre Renoir (1885–1952), who became a stage and film actor; Jean Renoir (1894–1979), who became a filmmaker of note; and Claude Renoir (1901–1969), who became a ceramic artist.

=== Later years ===
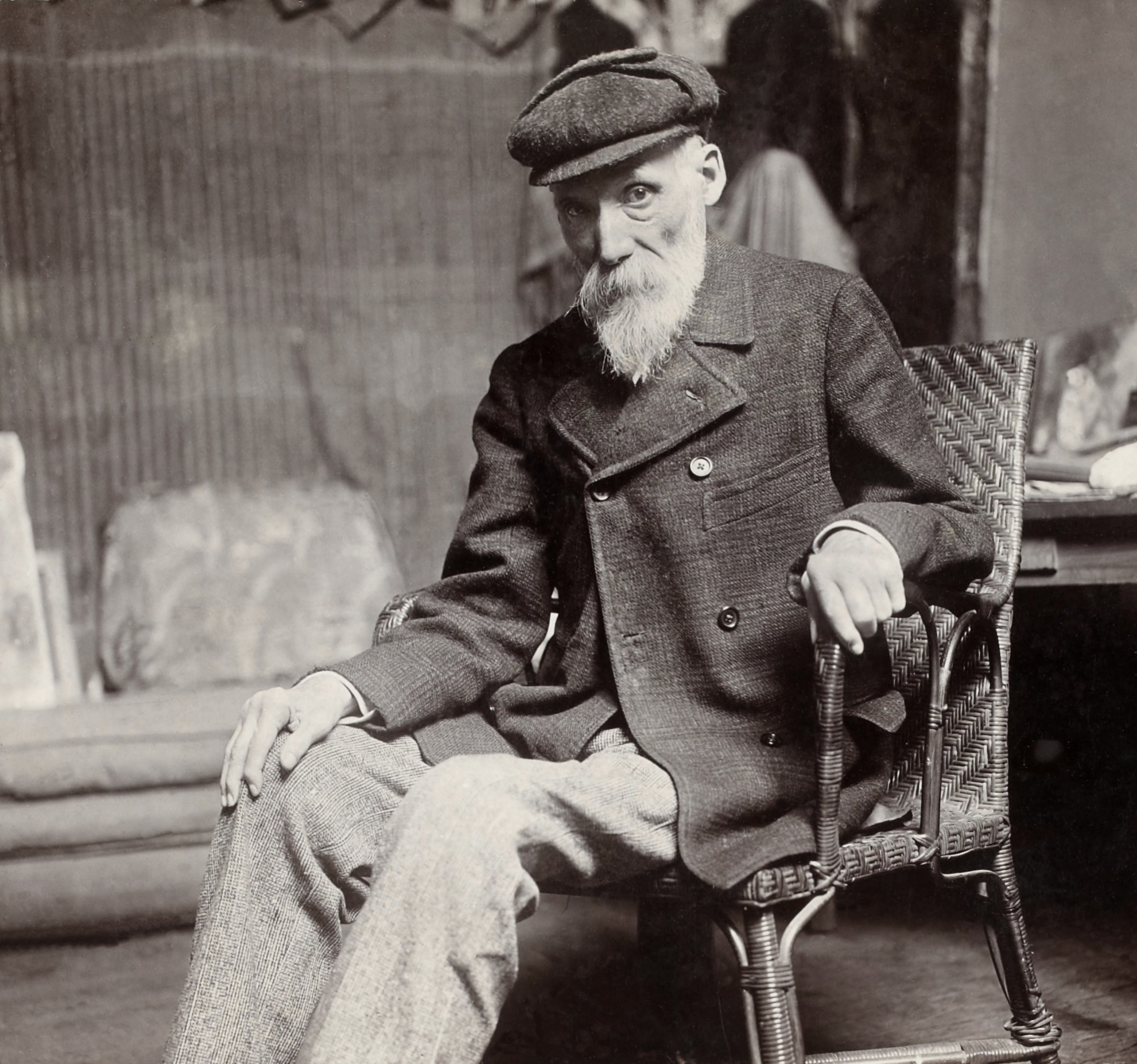
Pierre-Auguste Renoir, c. 1910

Around 1892, Renoir developed rheumatoid arthritis. In 1907, he moved to the warmer climate of "Les Collettes", a farm at the village of Cagnes-sur-Mer, Provence-Alpes-Côte d'Azur, close to the Mediterranean coast. Renoir painted during the last twenty years of his life even after his arthritis severely limited his mobility. He developed progressive deformities in his hands and ankylosis of his right shoulder, requiring him to change his painting technique. It has often been reported that in the advanced stages of his arthritis, he painted by having a brush strapped to his paralyzed fingers, but this is erroneous; Renoir remained able to grasp a brush, although he required an assistant to place it in his hand. The wrapping of his hands with bandages, apparent in late photographs of the artist, served to prevent skin irritation.

In 1919, Renoir visited the Louvre to see his paintings hanging with those of the old masters. During this period, he created sculptures by cooperating with a young artist, Richard Guino, who worked the clay. Due to his limited joint mobility, Renoir also used a moving canvas, or picture roll, to facilitate painting large works.

Renoir's portrait of the Austrian actress Tilla Durieux (1914) contains playful flecks of vibrant color on her shawl that offset the classical pose of the actress and highlight Renoir's skill just five years before his death.

Renoir died in Cagnes-sur-Mer on 3 December 1919 at the age of 78.

=== Family legacy ===
Renoir's great-grandson, Alexandre Renoir, has also become a professional artist. In 2018, the Monthaven Arts and Cultural Center in Hendersonville, Tennessee, United States, hosted Beauty Remains, an exhibition of his works. The exhibition title comes from a famous quotation by Renoir who, when asked why he continued to paint with his painful arthritis in his advanced years, replied "The pain passes, but the beauty remains."

== Artworks ==
Two Sisters (On the Terrace), oil on canvas, 1881, Art Institute of Chicago

Renoir's paintings are notable for their vibrant light and saturated color, most often focusing on people in intimate and candid compositions. The female nude was one of his primary subjects. However, in 1876, a reviewer in Le Figaro wrote "Try to explain to Monsieur Renoir that a woman's torso is not a mass of decomposing flesh with those purplish green stains that denote a state of complete putrefaction in a corpse." Yet in characteristic Impressionist style, Renoir suggested the details of a scene through freely brushed touches of colour, so that his figures softly fuse with one another and their surroundings.

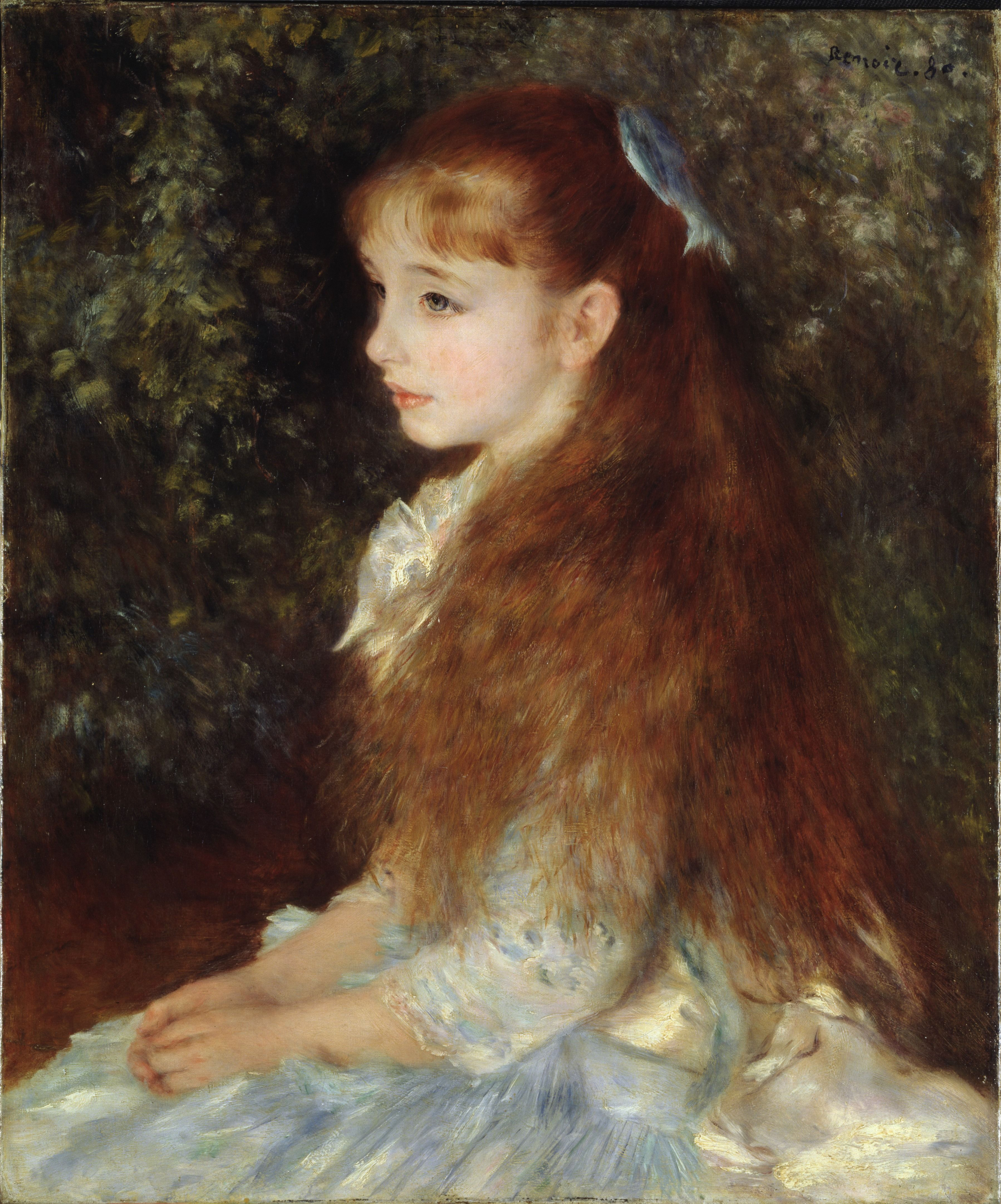
Portrait of Irène Cahen d'Anvers (La Petite Irène), 1880, Foundation E.G. Bührle, Zürich

His initial paintings show the influence of the colorism of Eugène Delacroix and the luminosity of Camille Corot. He also admired the realism of Gustave Courbet and Édouard Manet, and his early work resembles theirs in his use of black as a color. Renoir admired Edgar Degas' sense of movement. Other painters Renoir greatly admired were the 18th-century masters François Boucher and Jean-Honoré Fragonard.

A fine example of Renoir's early work and evidence of the influence of Courbet's realism, is Diana, 1867. Ostensibly a mythological subject, the painting is a naturalistic studio work; the figure carefully observed, solidly modeled and superimposed upon a contrived landscape. If the work is a "student" piece, Renoir's heightened personal response to female sensuality is present. The model was Lise Tréhot, the artist's mistress at that time, and inspiration for a number of paintings.

In the late 1860s, through the practice of painting light and water en plein air (outdoors), he and his friend Claude Monet discovered that the color of shadows is not brown or black, but the reflected color of the objects surrounding them, an effect known today as diffuse reflection. Several pairs of paintings exist in which Renoir and Monet worked side-by-side, depicting the same scenes (La Grenouillère, 1869).

One of the best-known Impressionist works is Renoir's 1876 Dance at Le Moulin de la Galette (Bal du moulin de la Galette). The painting depicts an open-air scene, crowded with people at a popular dance garden on the Butte Montmartre close to where he lived. The works of his early maturity were typically Impressionist snapshots of real life, full of sparkling color and light.

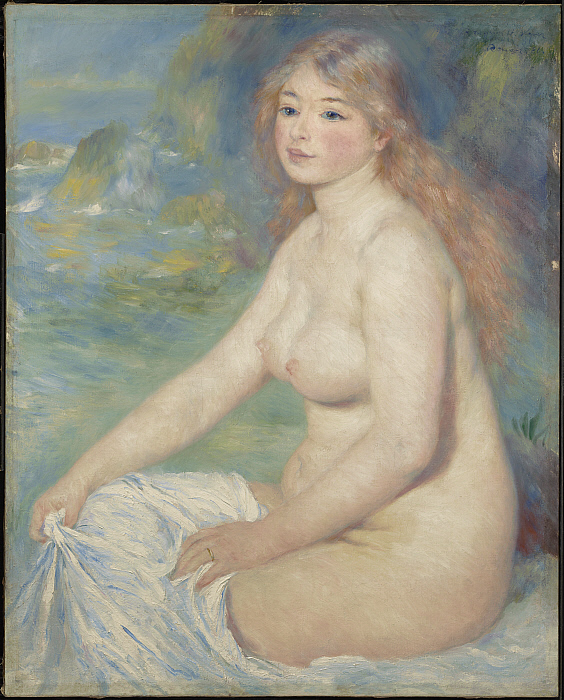
One of a series, Blonde Bather (1881), marked a distinct change in style following a trip to Italy. The work is part of the permanent collection of the Clark Art Institute.

By the mid-1880s, however, he had broken with the movement to apply a more disciplined formal technique to portraits and figure paintings, particularly of women. It was a trip to Italy in 1881 when he saw works by Raphael, Leonardo da Vinci, Titian, and other Renaissance masters, that convinced him that he was on the wrong path. At that point he declared, "I had gone as far as I could with Impressionism and I realized I could neither paint nor draw".

For the next several years he painted in a more severe style in an attempt to return to classicism. Concentrating on his drawing and emphasizing the outlines of figures, he painted works such as Blonde Bather (1881 and 1882) and The Large Bathers (1884–1887; Philadelphia Museum of Art) during what is sometimes referred to as his "Ingres period".

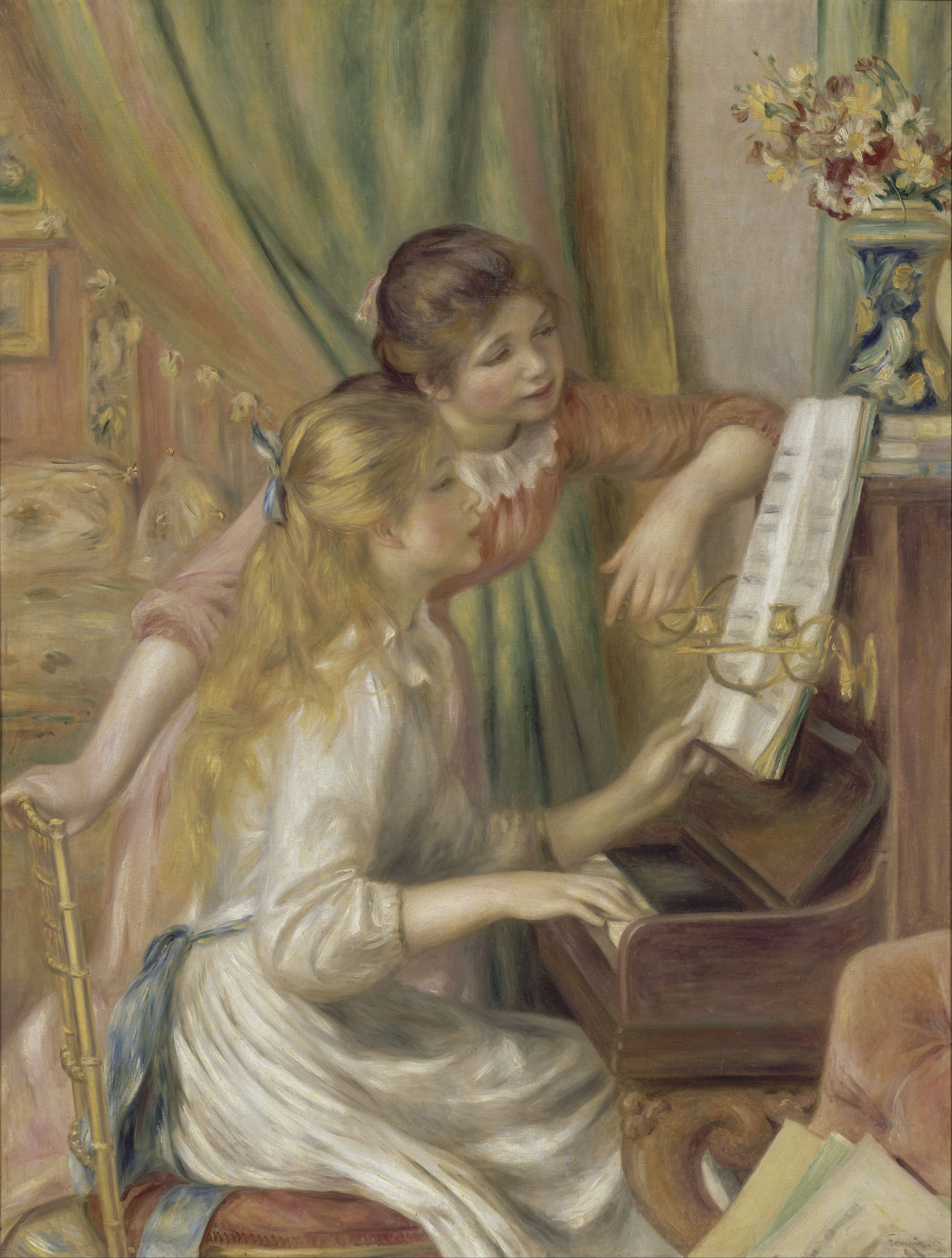
Girls at the Piano, 1892, Musée d'Orsay, Paris

After 1890 he changed direction again. To dissolve outlines, as in his earlier work, he returned to thinly brushed color.

From this period onward he concentrated on monumental nudes and domestic scenes, fine examples of which are Girls at the Piano, 1892, and Grandes Baigneuses, 1887. The latter painting is the most typical and successful of Renoir's late, abundantly fleshed nudes.

A prolific artist, he created several thousand paintings. The warm sensuality of Renoir's style made his paintings some of the most well-known and frequently reproduced works in the history of art. The single largest collection of his works—181 paintings in all—is at the Barnes Foundation, in Philadelphia, United States.

=== Catalogue raisonné ===
A five-volume catalogue raisonné of Renoir's works (with one supplement) was published by Bernheim-Jeune between 1983 and 2014. Bernheim-Jeune is the only surviving major art dealer that was used by Renoir. The Wildenstein Institute is preparing, but has not yet published, a critical catalogue of Renoir's work. A disagreement between these two organizations concerning an unsigned work in Picton Castle was at the centre of the second episode of the fourth season of the television series Fake or Fortune.

=== Posthumous prints ===
In 1919, Ambroise Vollard, a renowned art dealer, published a book on the life and work of Renoir, La Vie et l'Œuvre de Pierre-Auguste Renoir, in an edition of 1000 copies. In 1986, Vollard's heirs started reprinting the copper plates, generally, etchings with hand applied watercolor. These prints are signed by Renoir in the plate and are embossed "Vollard" in the lower margin. They are not numbered, dated or signed in pencil.

=== Posthumous sales ===
A small version of Bal du moulin de la Galette sold for $78.1 million 17 May 1990 at Sotheby's New York.

In 2012, Renoir's Paysage Bords de Seine was offered for sale at auction but the painting was discovered to have been stolen from the Baltimore Museum of Art in 1951. The sale was cancelled.

=== Painting thefts ===
On 8 September 2011, the work Madeleine Leaning on Her Elbow with Flowers in Her Hair (1918) was stolen during an armed robbery from a home in Houston, Texas. A reward of up to $50,000 was offered for information leading to the recovery of the painting.

On 22 March 2026, four masked men stole Renoir's Les Poissons (1917), along with two other works by Cézanne and Matisse, with a combined estimated value of €9 million (£7.7m; $10.5m), in a heist at the Magnani Rocca Foundation villa near Parma, Italy. In August 2026 it was announced that the paintings had been recovered.

On 8 September 2026, two thieves broke into the Musée Renoir at Cagnes-sur-Mer in France, and stole four Renoir paintings, before dropping two during their escape. Each of the paintings had an estimated value of approximately €9 million (£7.7m; $10.5m). The two paintings taken were Portrait of Madame Colonna Romano and Jeune Femme au puits. The two paintings were recovered in October 2026.

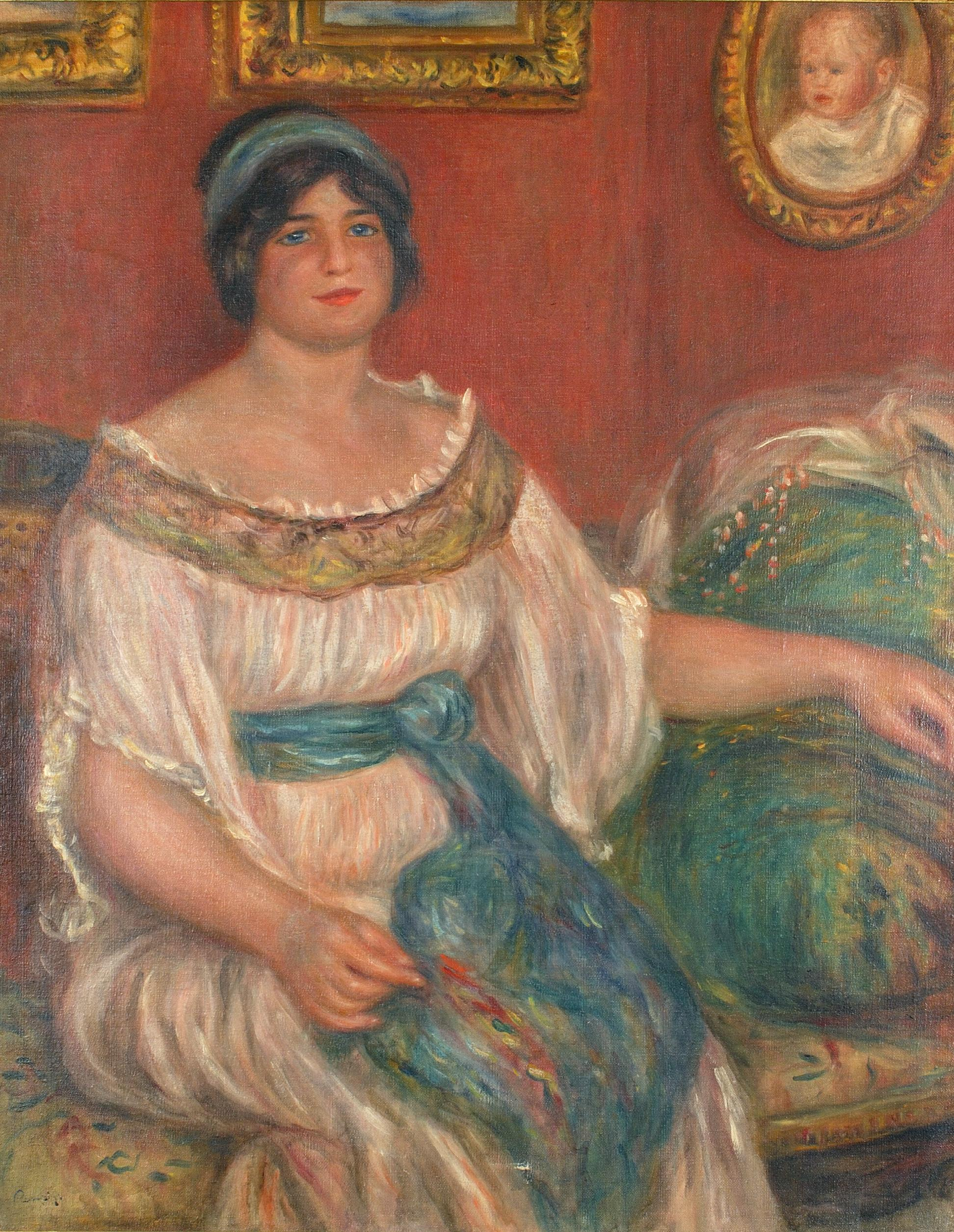
Portrait of Madame Colonna Romano (c. 1913), one of the stolen paintings

Jeune Femme au puits (1886), one of the stolen paintings

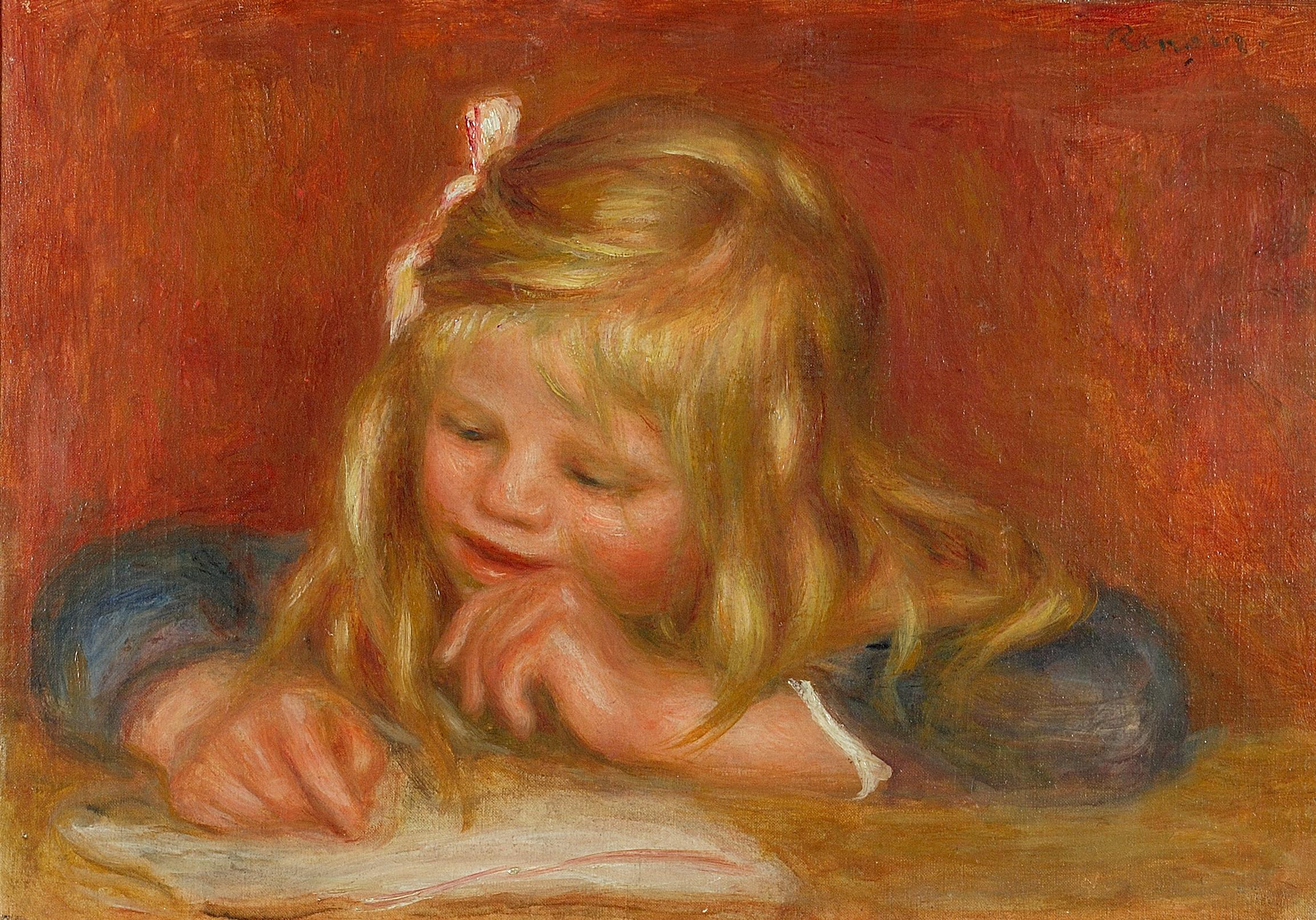
Coco lisant (1905), reportedly dropped by the thieves

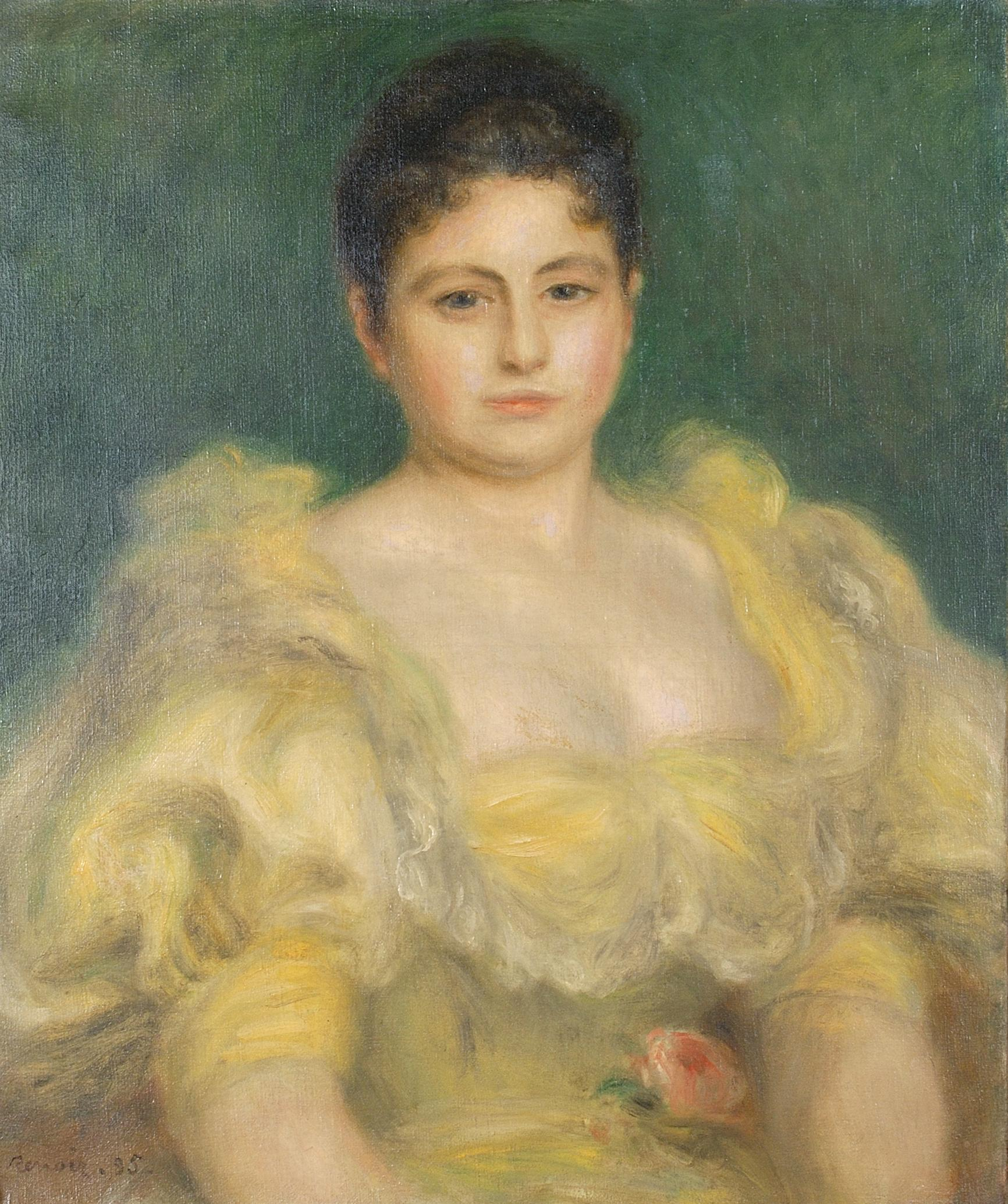
Portrait of Madame Stephen Pichon (1895), reportedly dropped by the thieves

== Honours and awards ==
- Chevalier of Order of Legion of Honour (1901)
- Officier of Order of Legion of Honour (1911)
- Chevalier of Order of Legion of Honour (1919)

== Gallery of paintings ==
=== Portraits and landscapes ===
Portrait of Romaine Lacaux, 1864, Cleveland Museum of Art

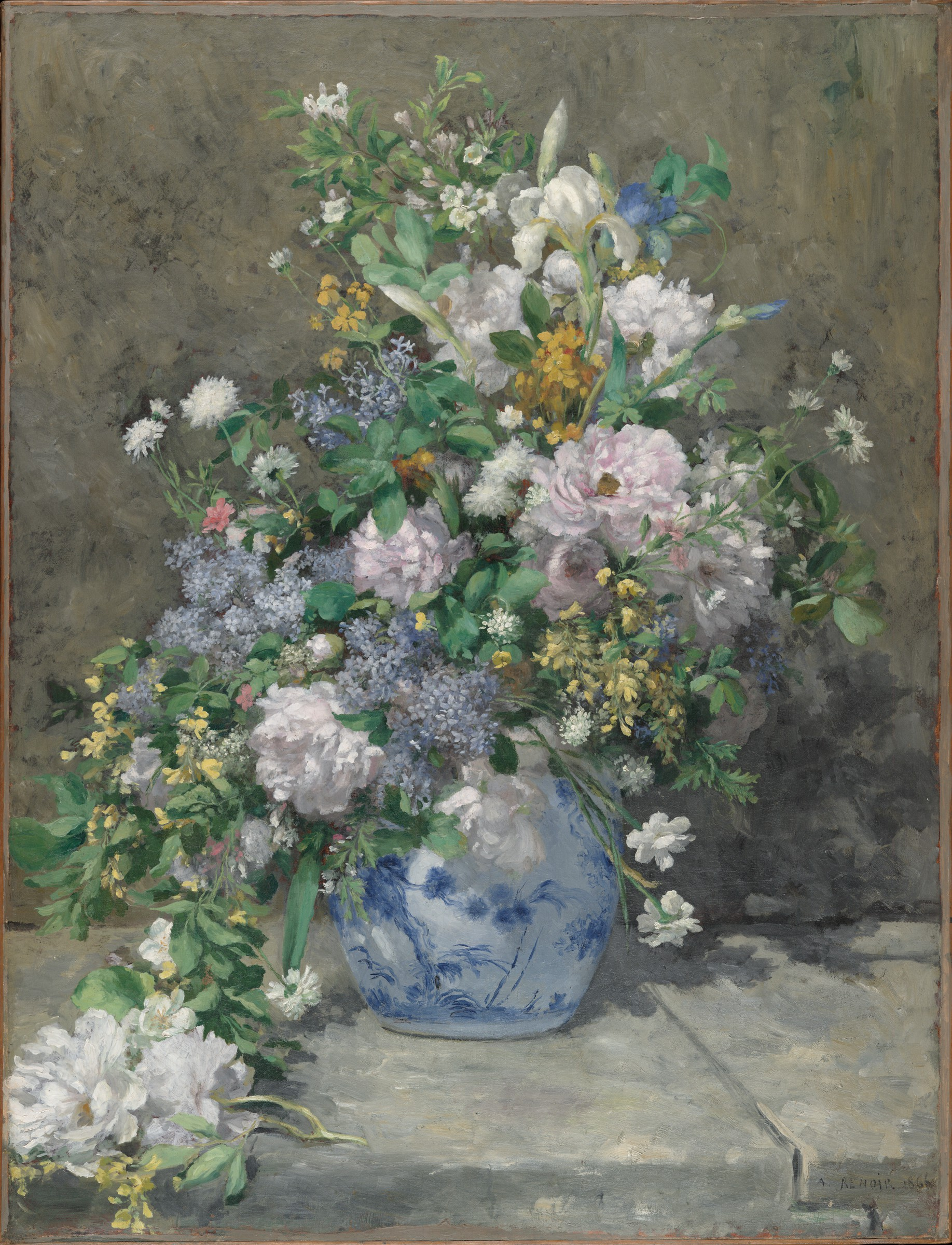
Spring Bouquet, 1866, Fogg Museum, Cambridge

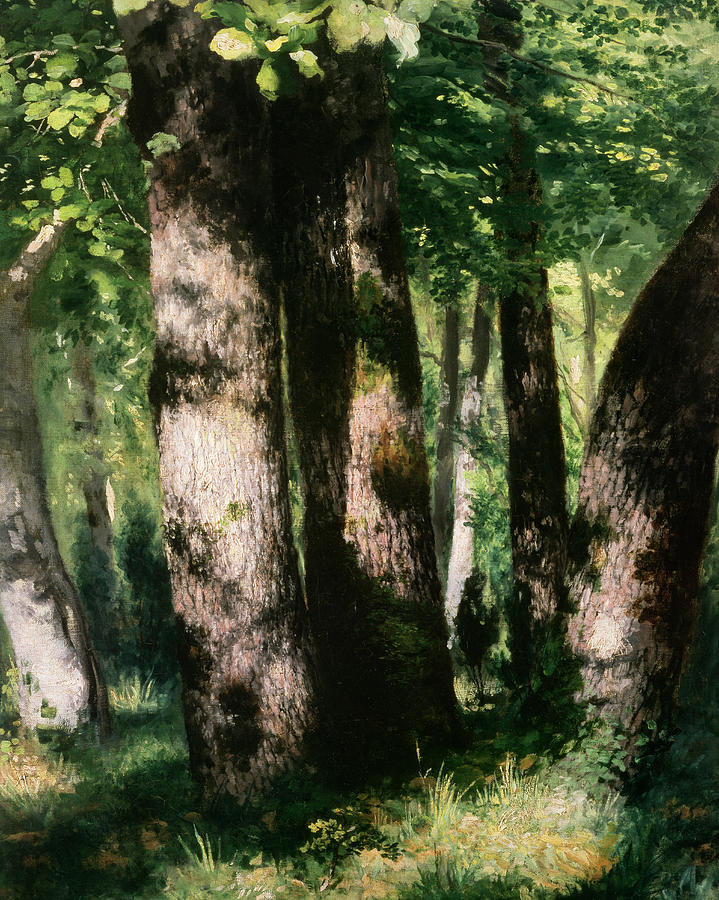
Dans la forêt de Fontainebleau, 1866, private collection

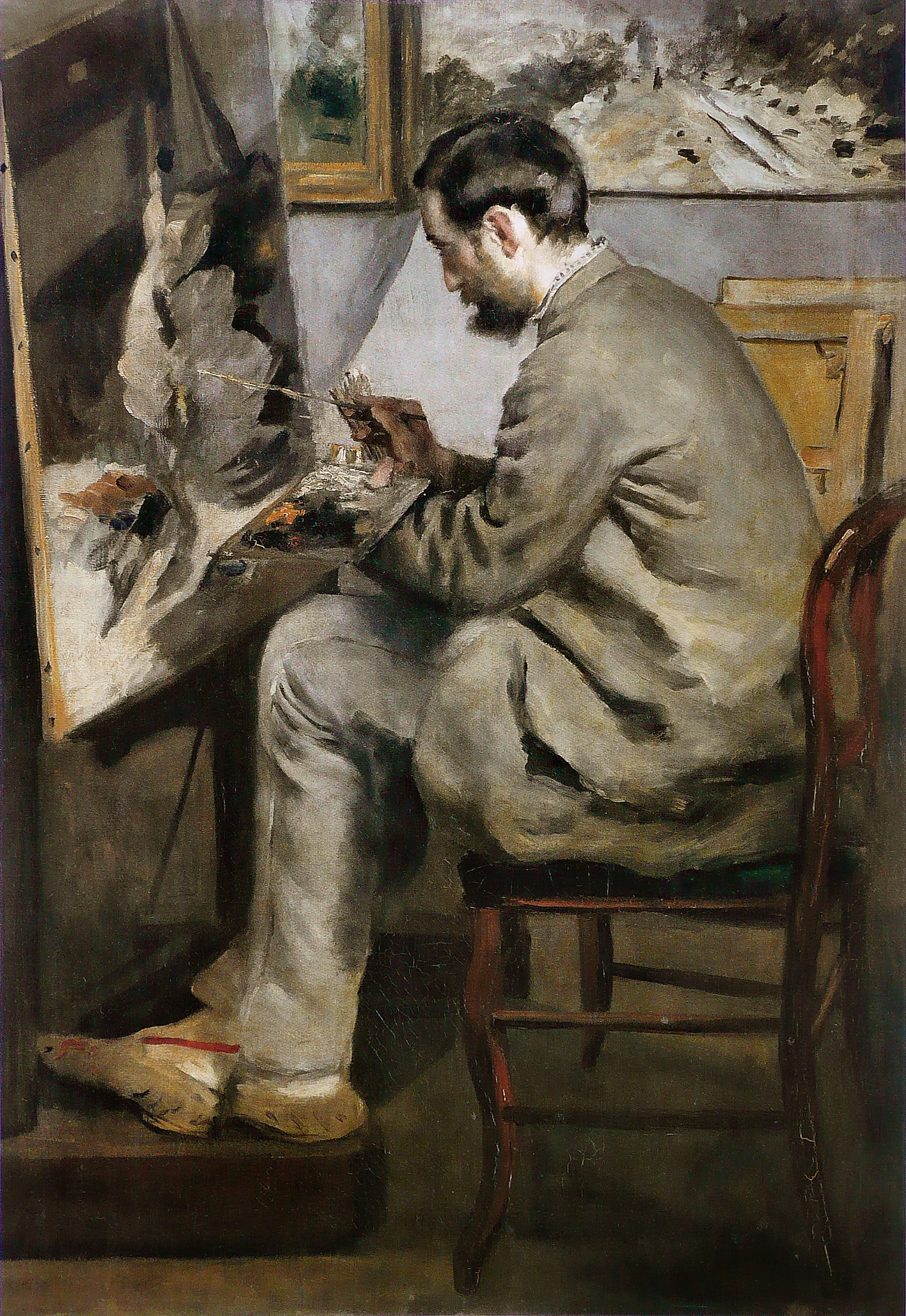
Frédéric Bazille at his Easel, 1867, Musée Fabre, Montpellier

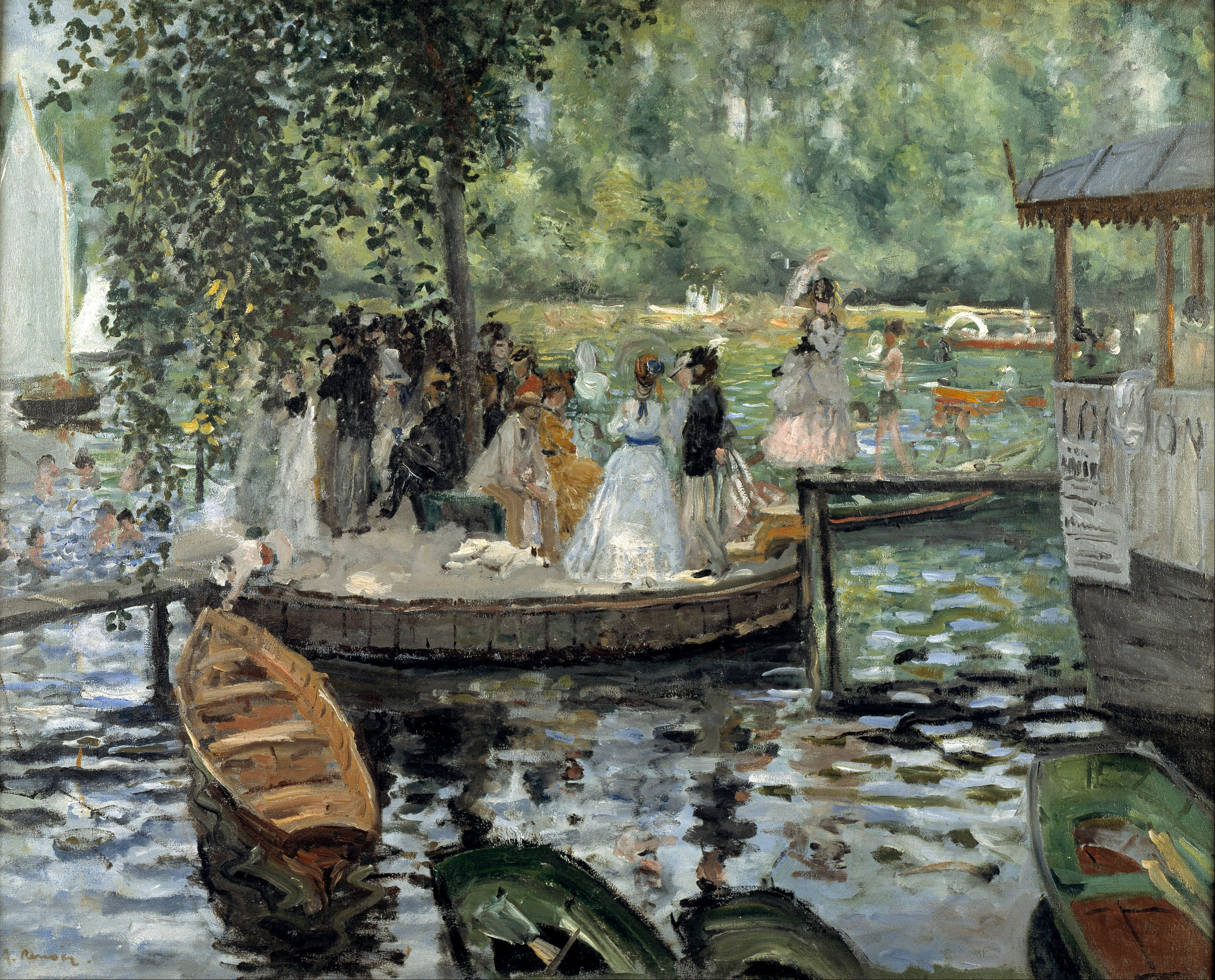
La Grenouillère, 1868, Nationalmuseum, Stockholm

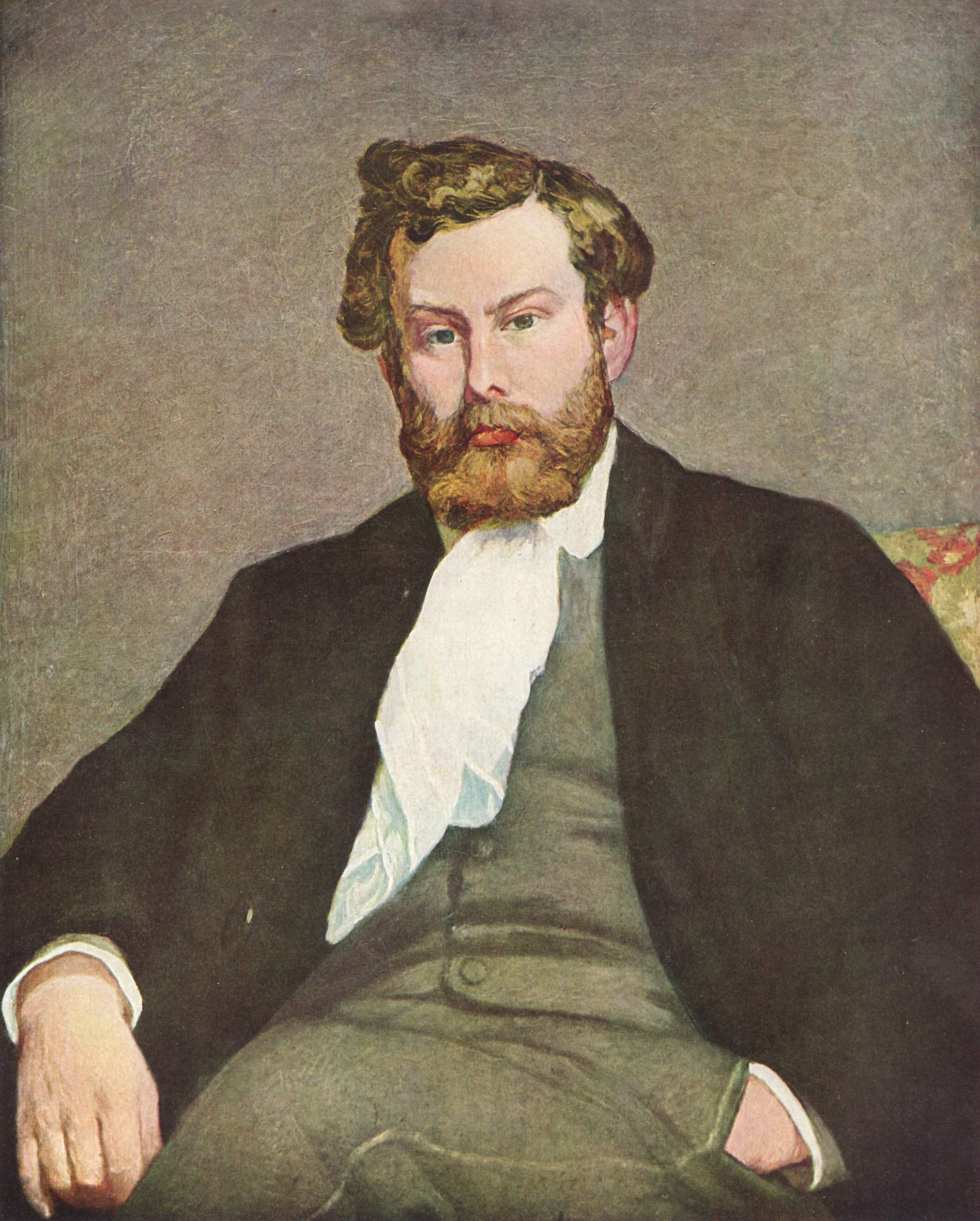
Portrait of Alfred Sisley, 1868, Foundation E. G. Bührle, Zürich

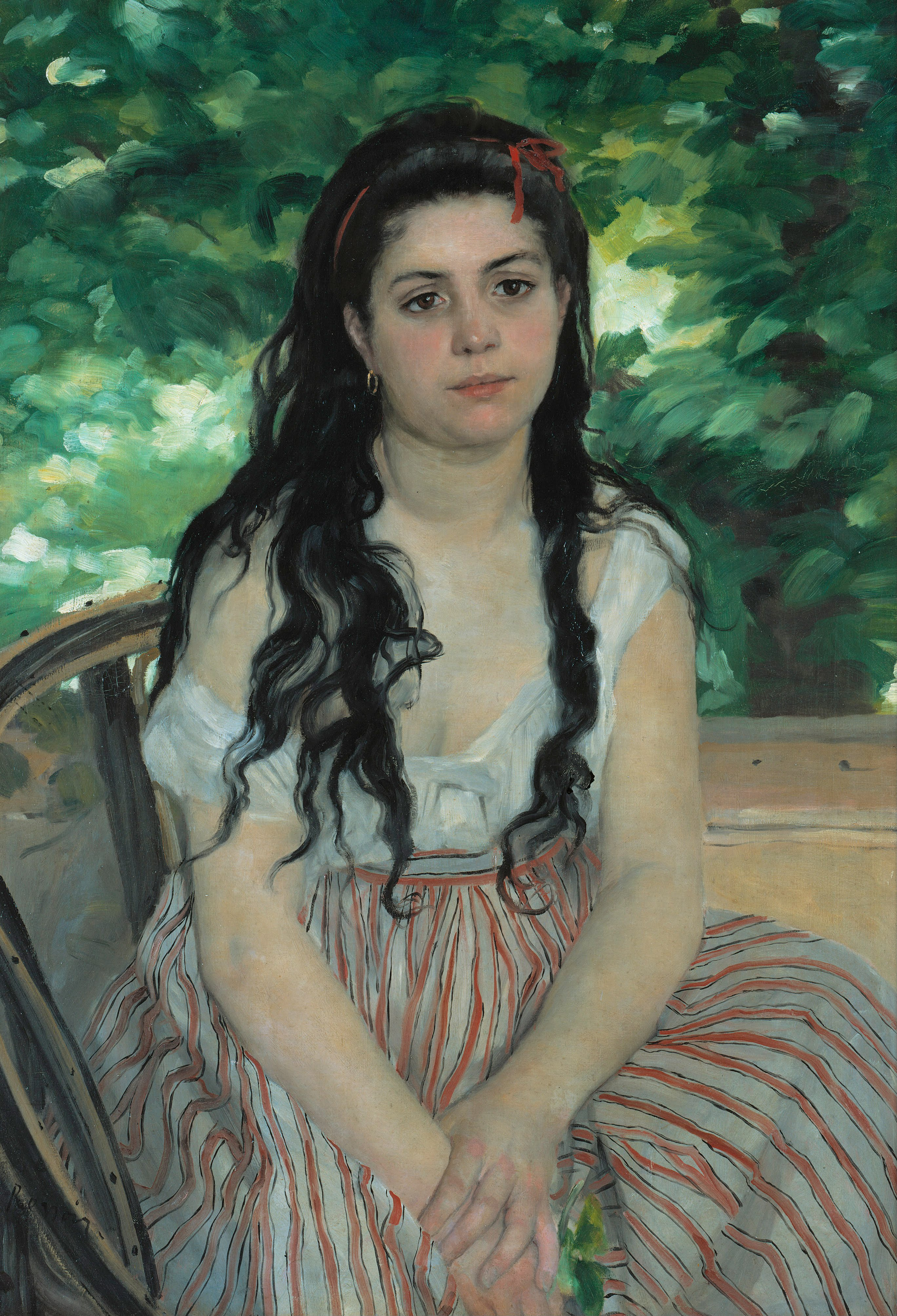
In Summer (En été), 1868, Alte Nationalgalerie, Berlin

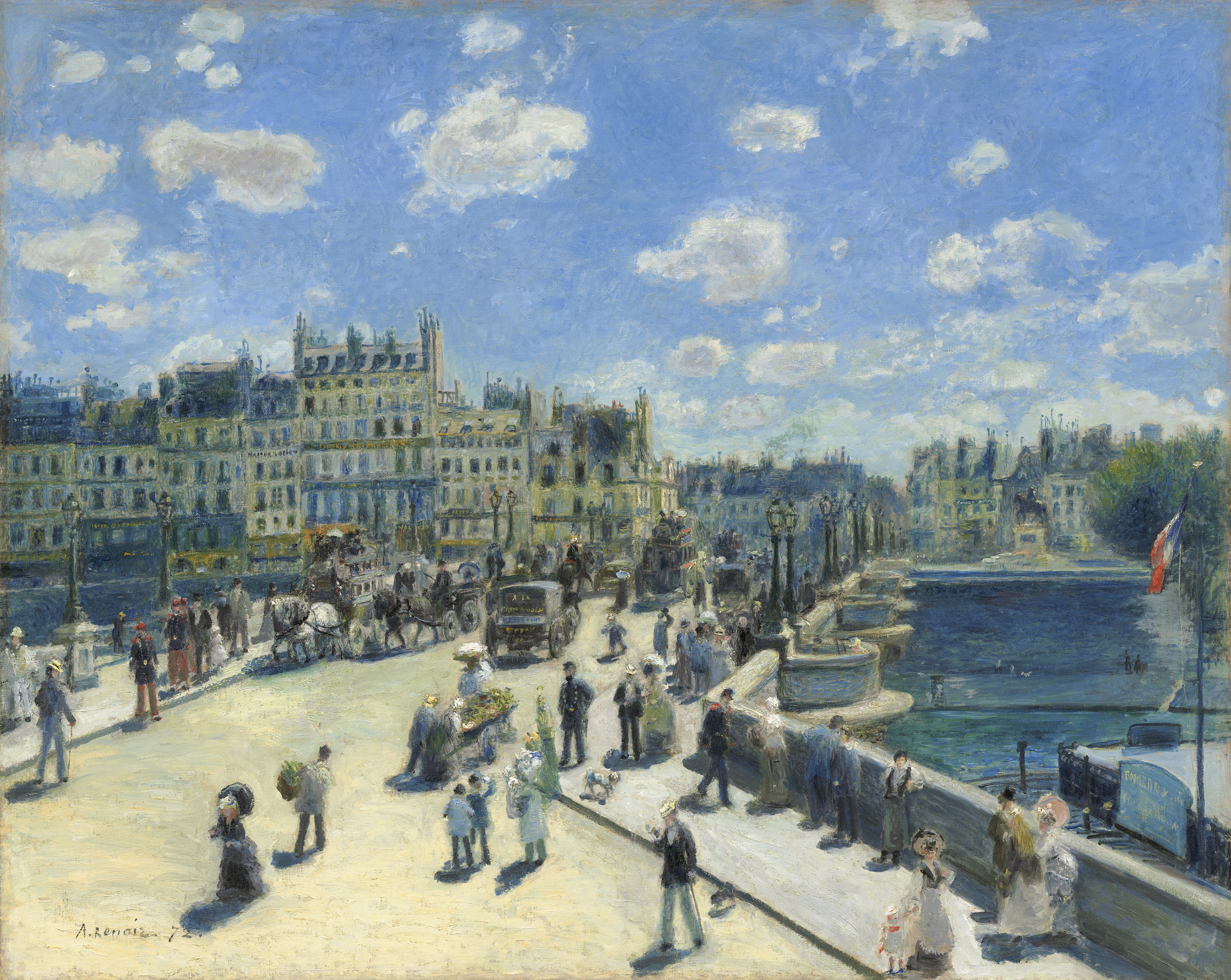
Pont-Neuf, 1872, National Gallery of Art, Washington, D.C.

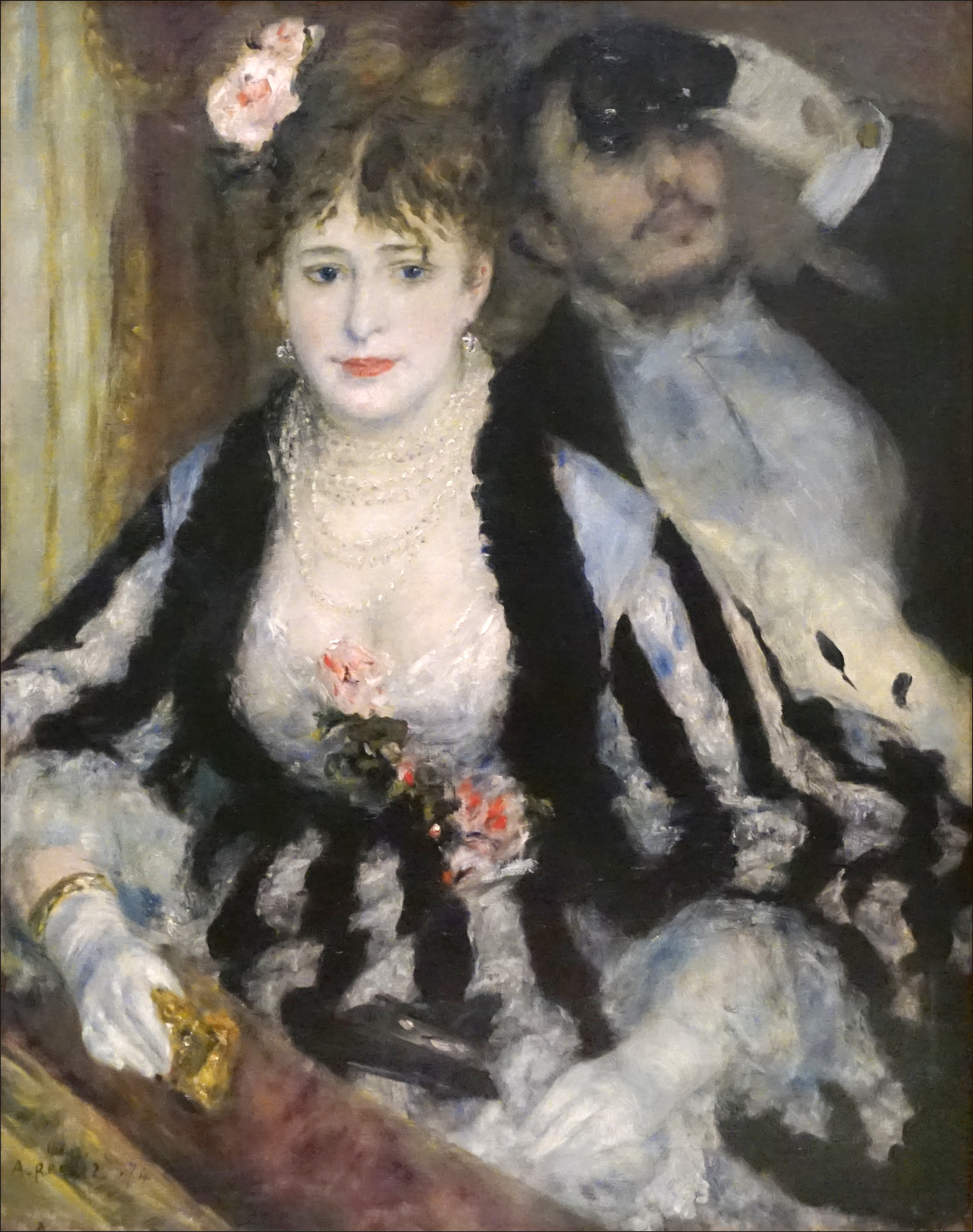
La Loge (The Theatre Box), 1874, The Courtauld Institute of Art, London

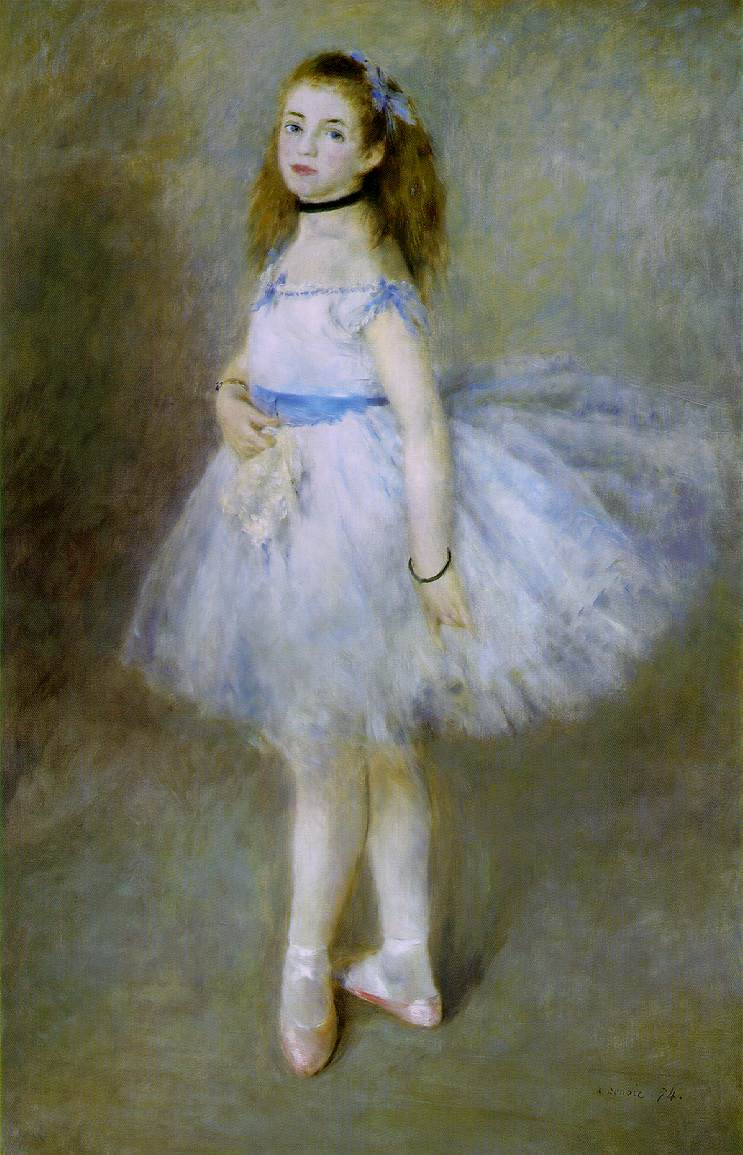
The Dancer, 1874, National Gallery of Art, Washington, D.C.

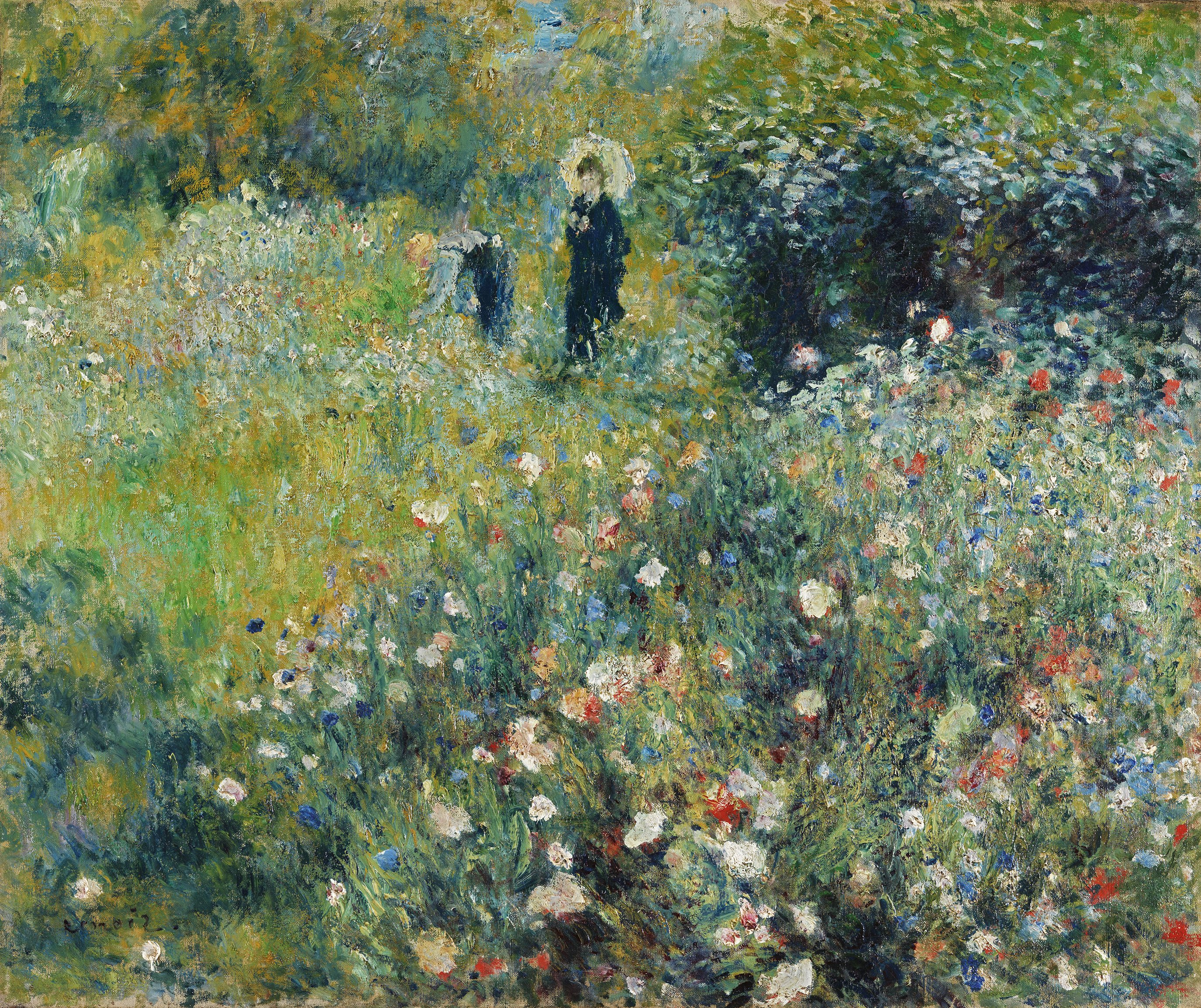
Woman with a Parasol in a Garden, 1875, Thyssen-Bornemisza Museum, Madrid

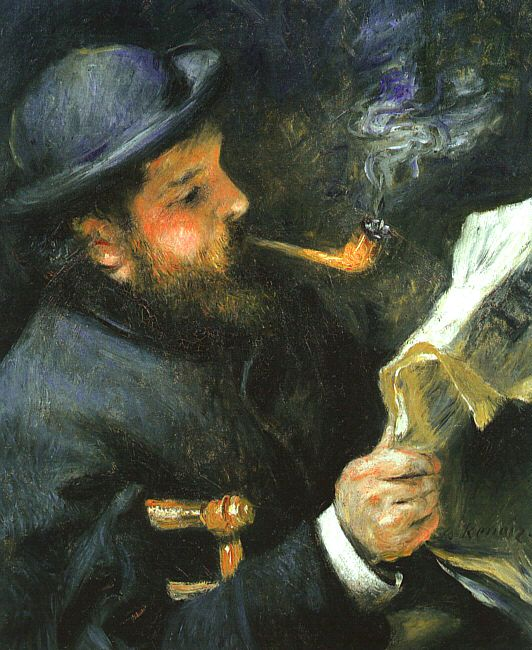
Portrait of Claude Monet reading, c. 1875, Musée Marmottan Monet, Paris, France

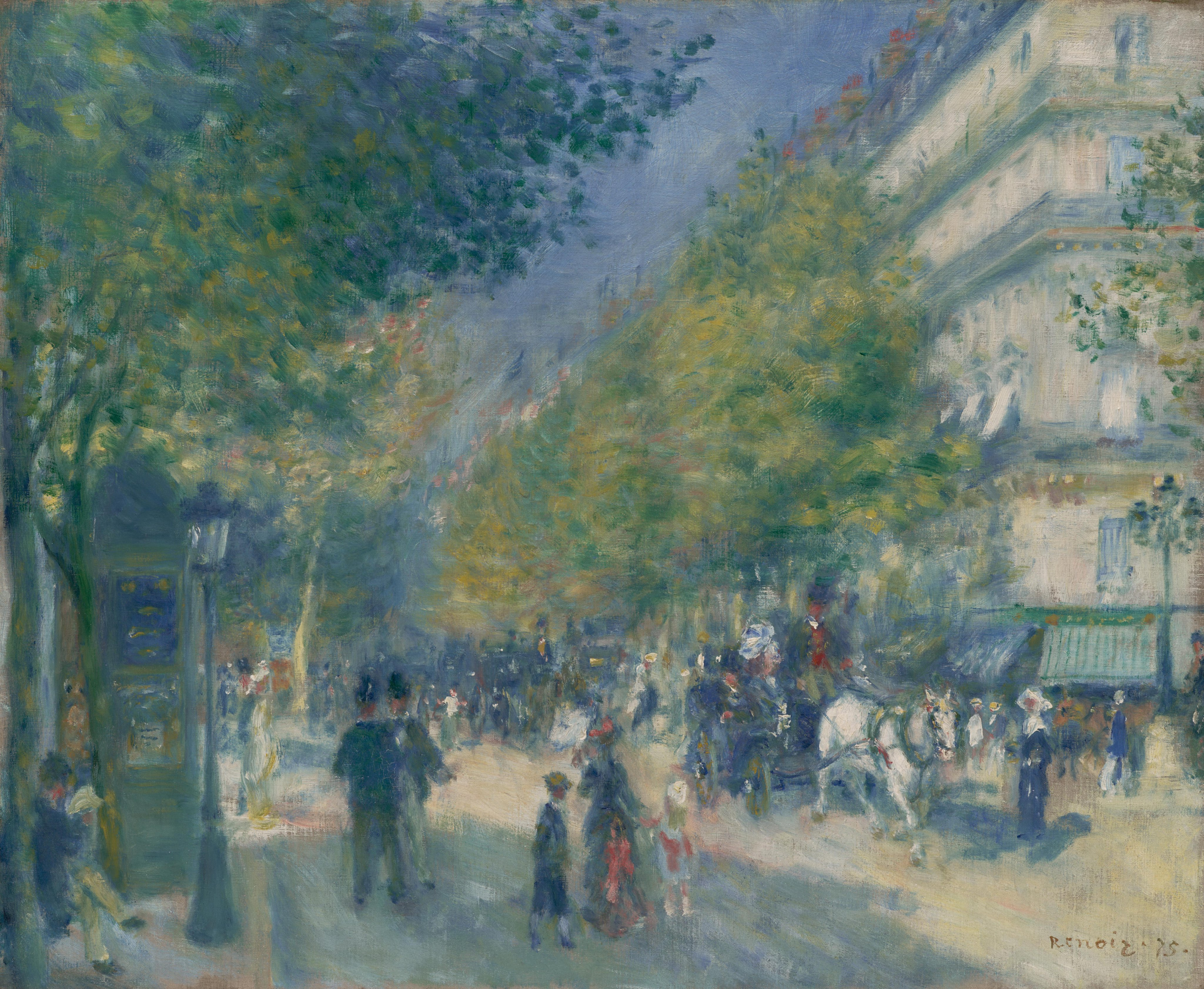
The Grands Boulevards, 1875, Philadelphia Museum of Art

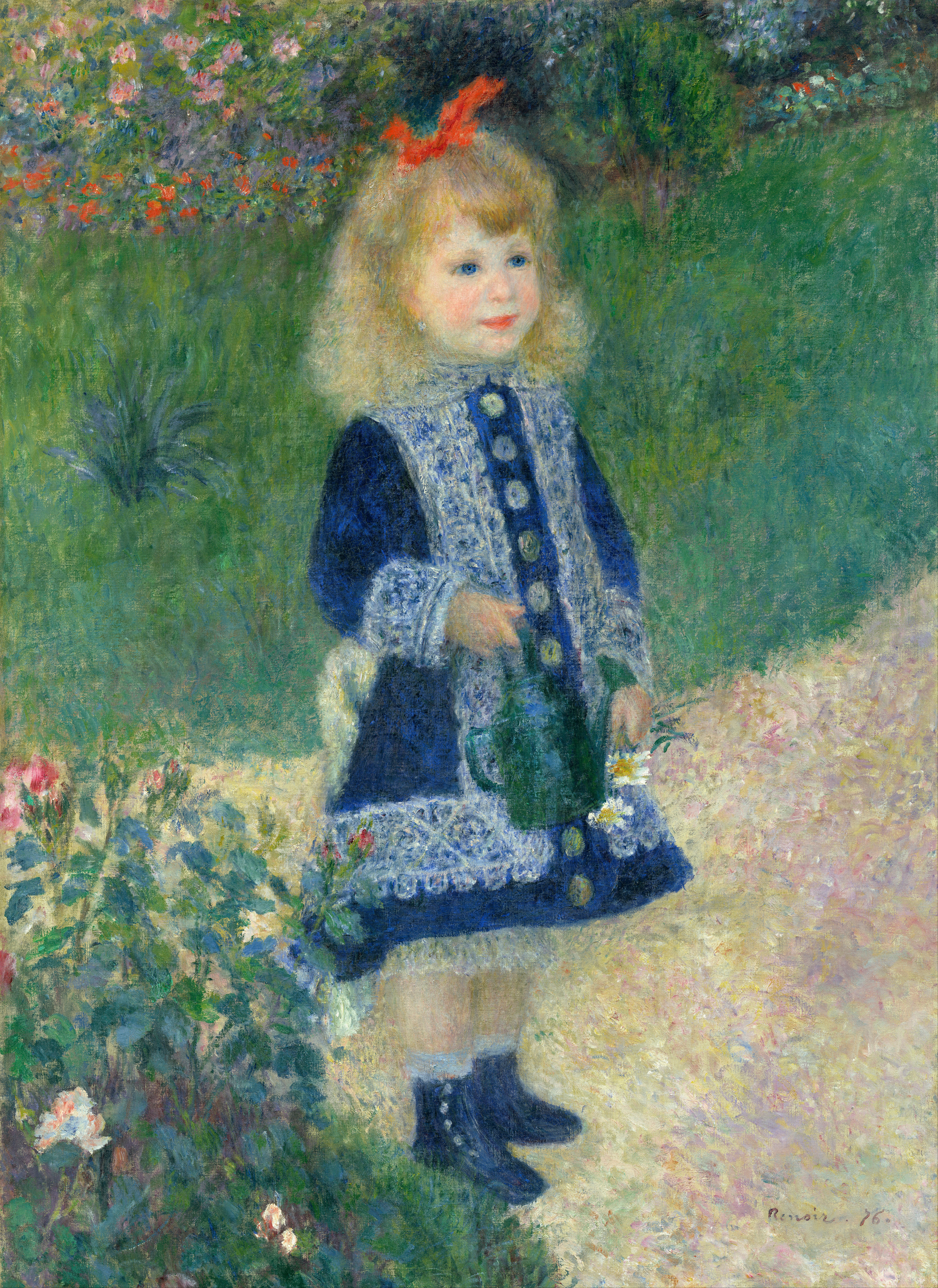
A Girl with a Watering Can, 1876, National Gallery of Art, Washington, D.C.

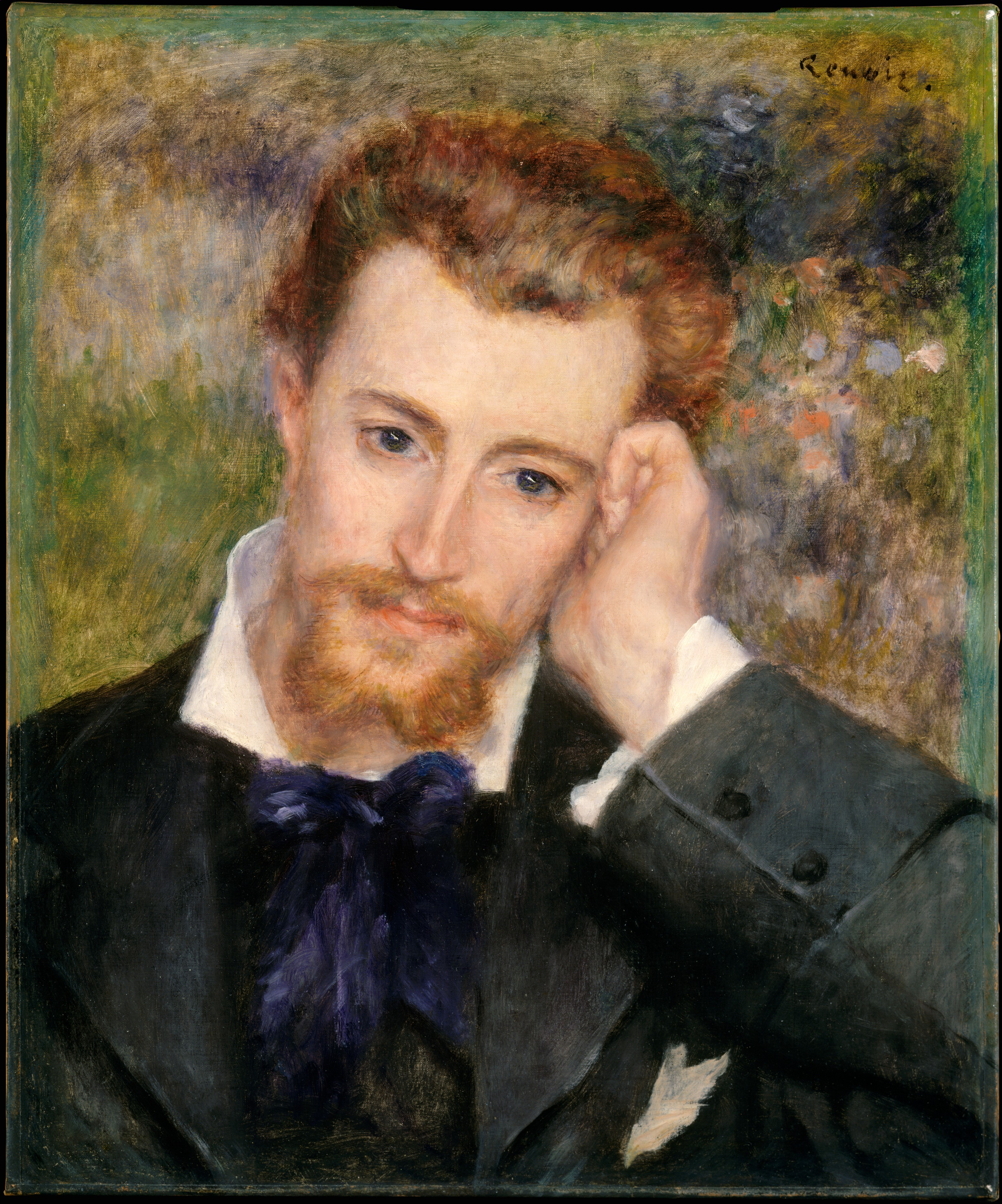
Portrait of Eugène Murer, 1876, Metropolitan Museum of Art, New York

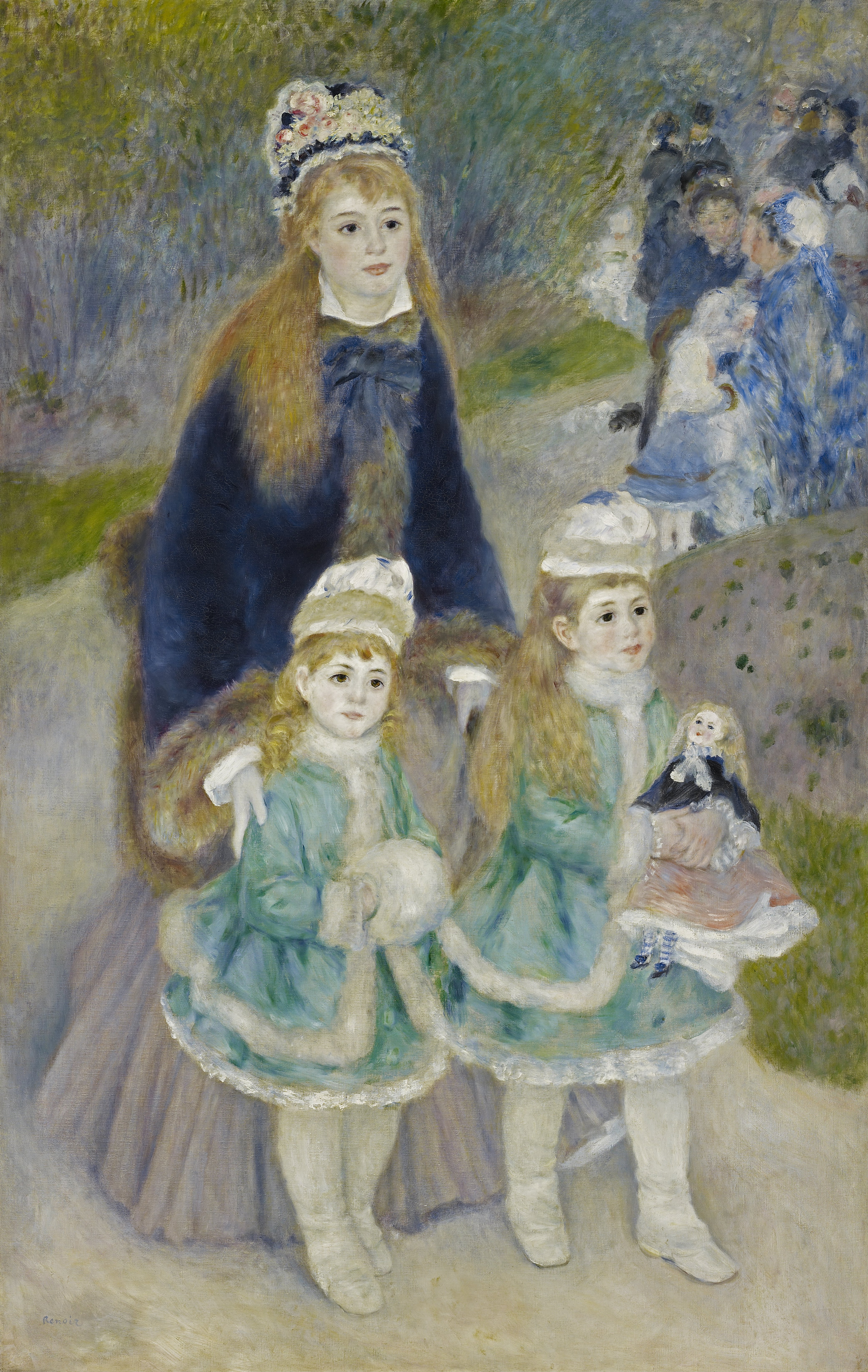
Mother and Children, 1876, Frick Collection, New York

Portrait of Jeanne Samary, 1877, Pushkin Museum, Moscow

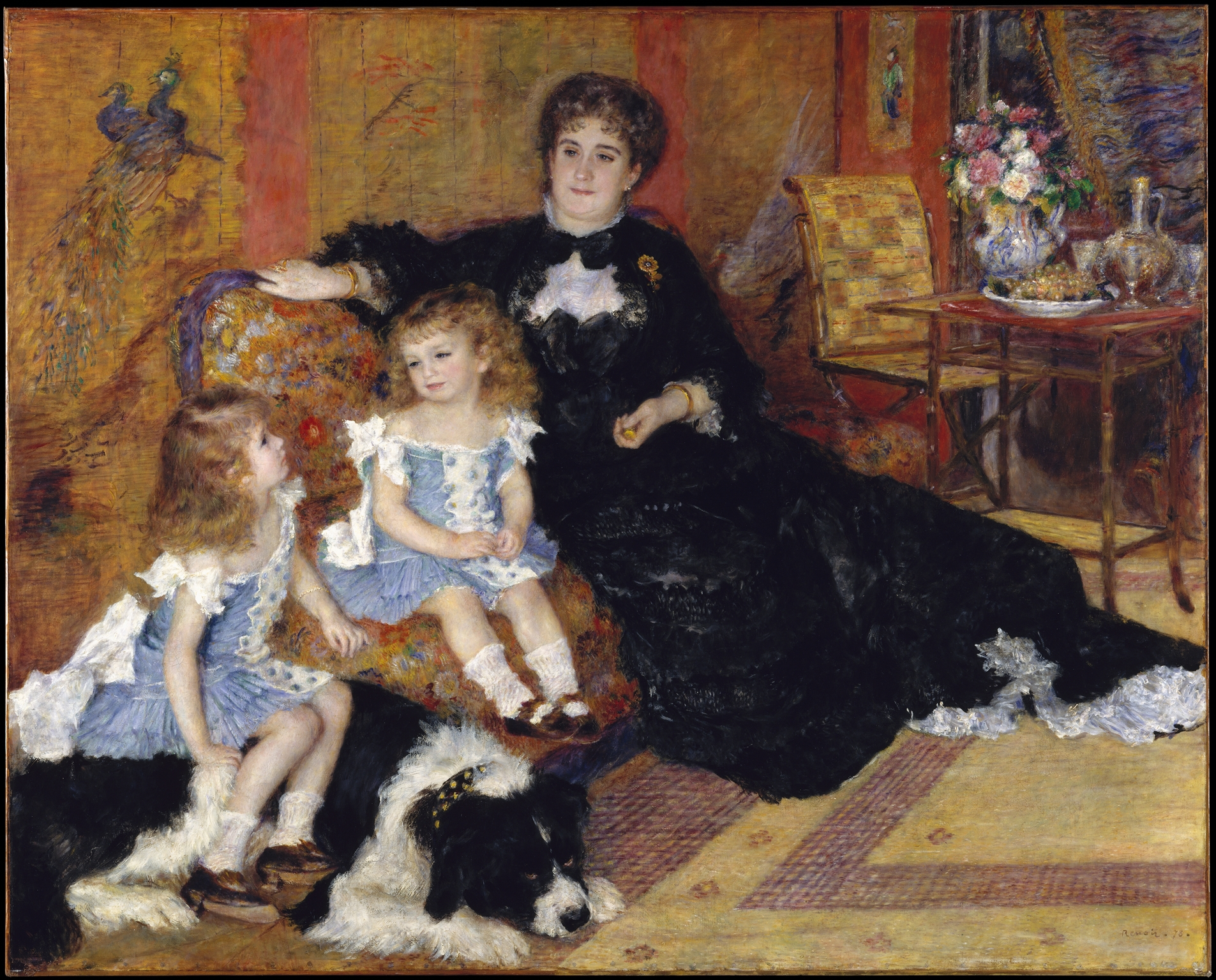
Mme. Charpentier and her children, 1878, Metropolitan Museum of Art, New York

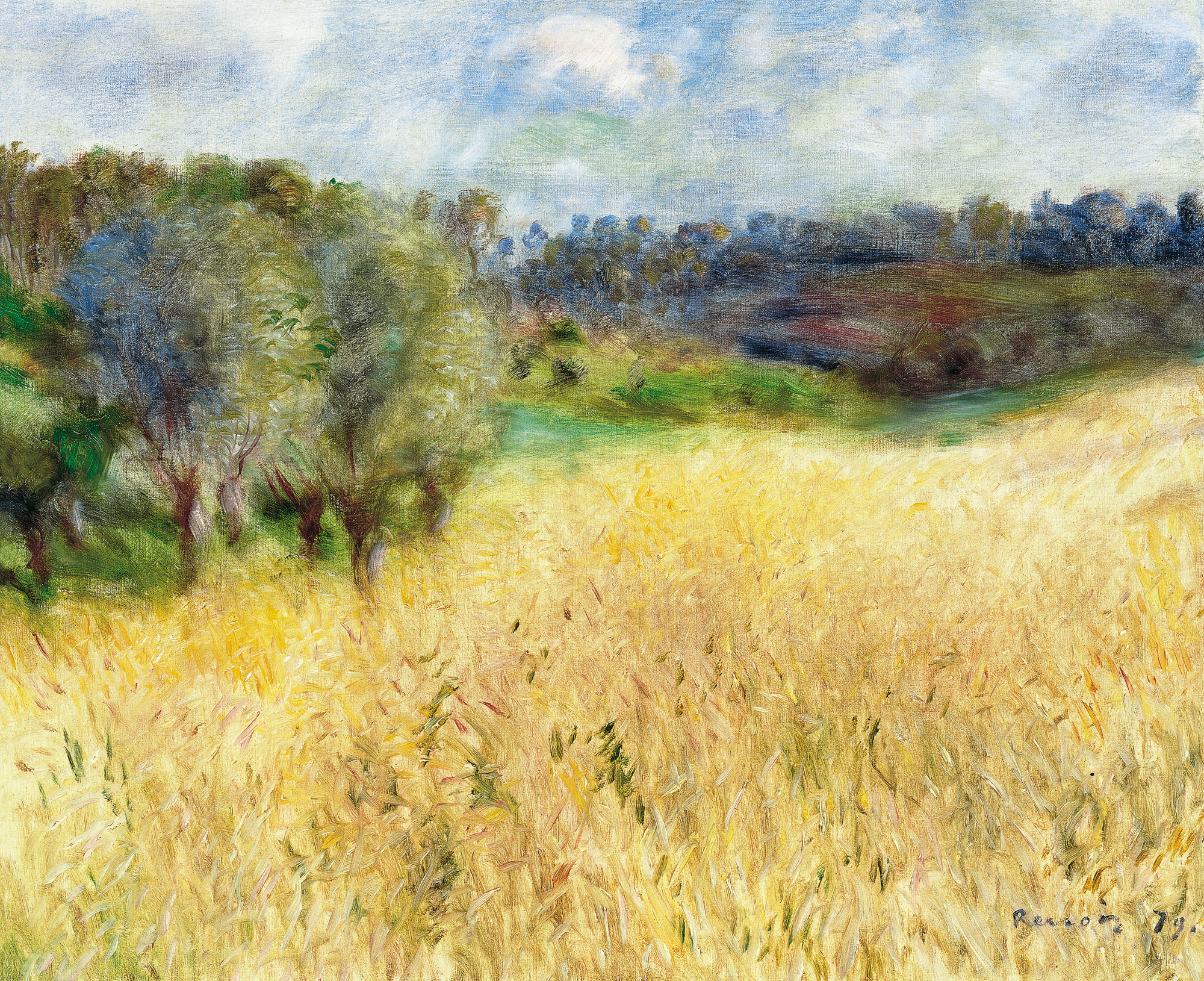
Wheatfield, 1879, Thyssen-Bornemisza Museum, Madrid

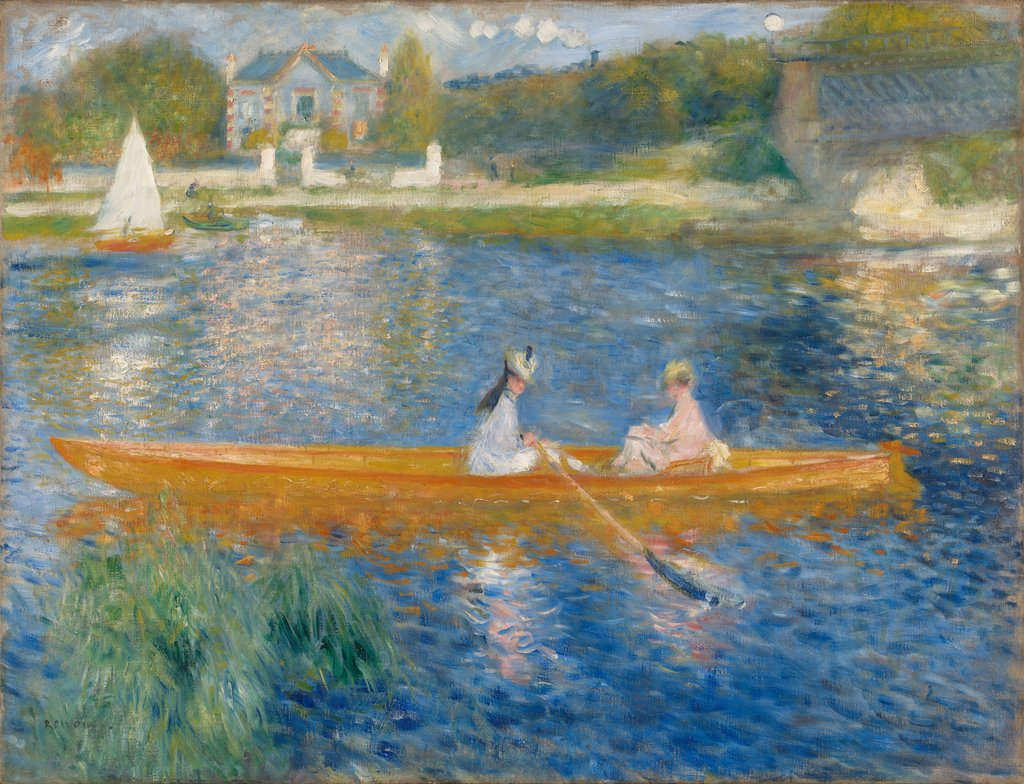
Pierre-Auguste Renoir, Boating on the Seine (La Yole), c. 1879, National Gallery, London

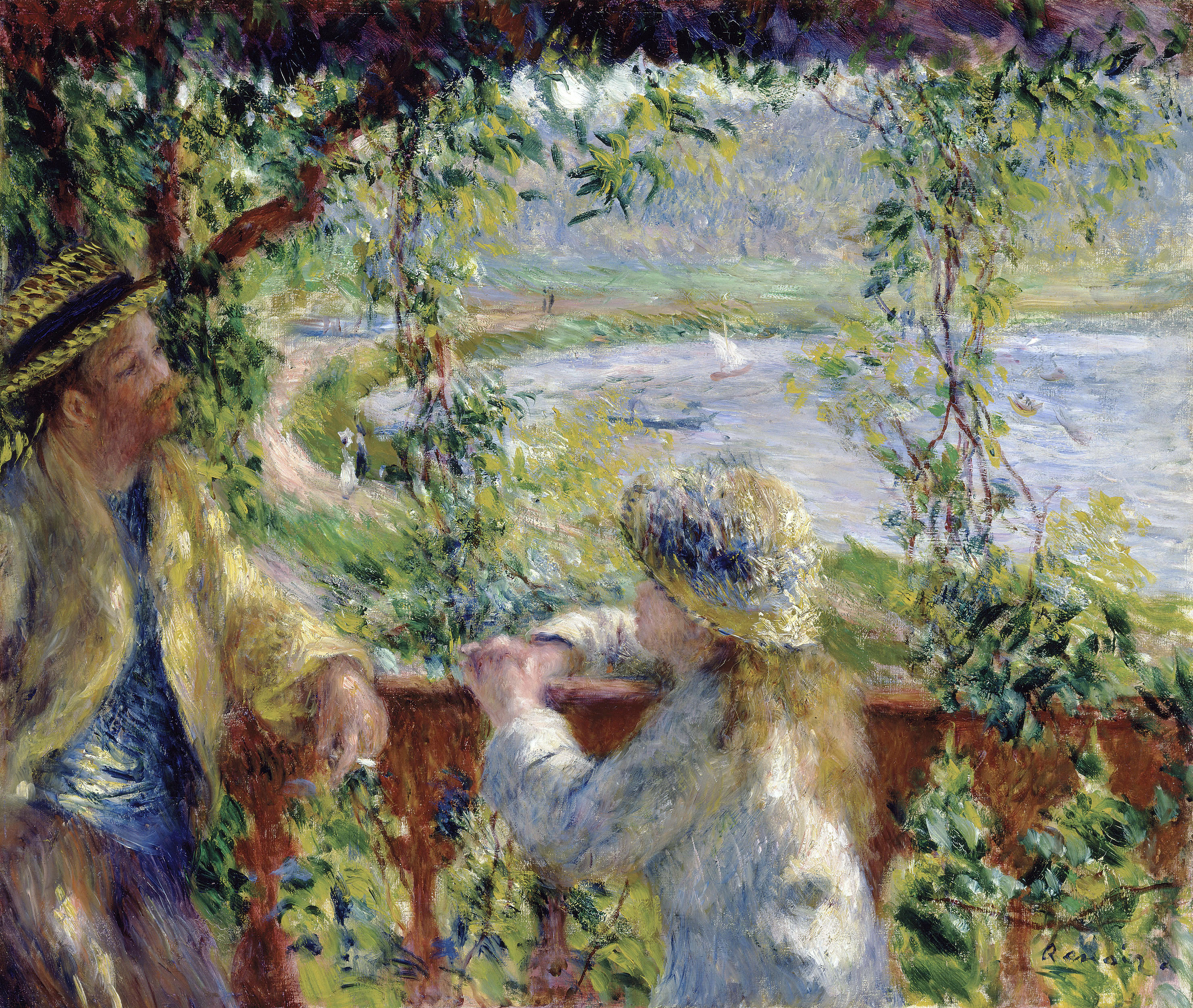
By the Water, 1880, Art Institute of Chicago, Chicago, Illinois

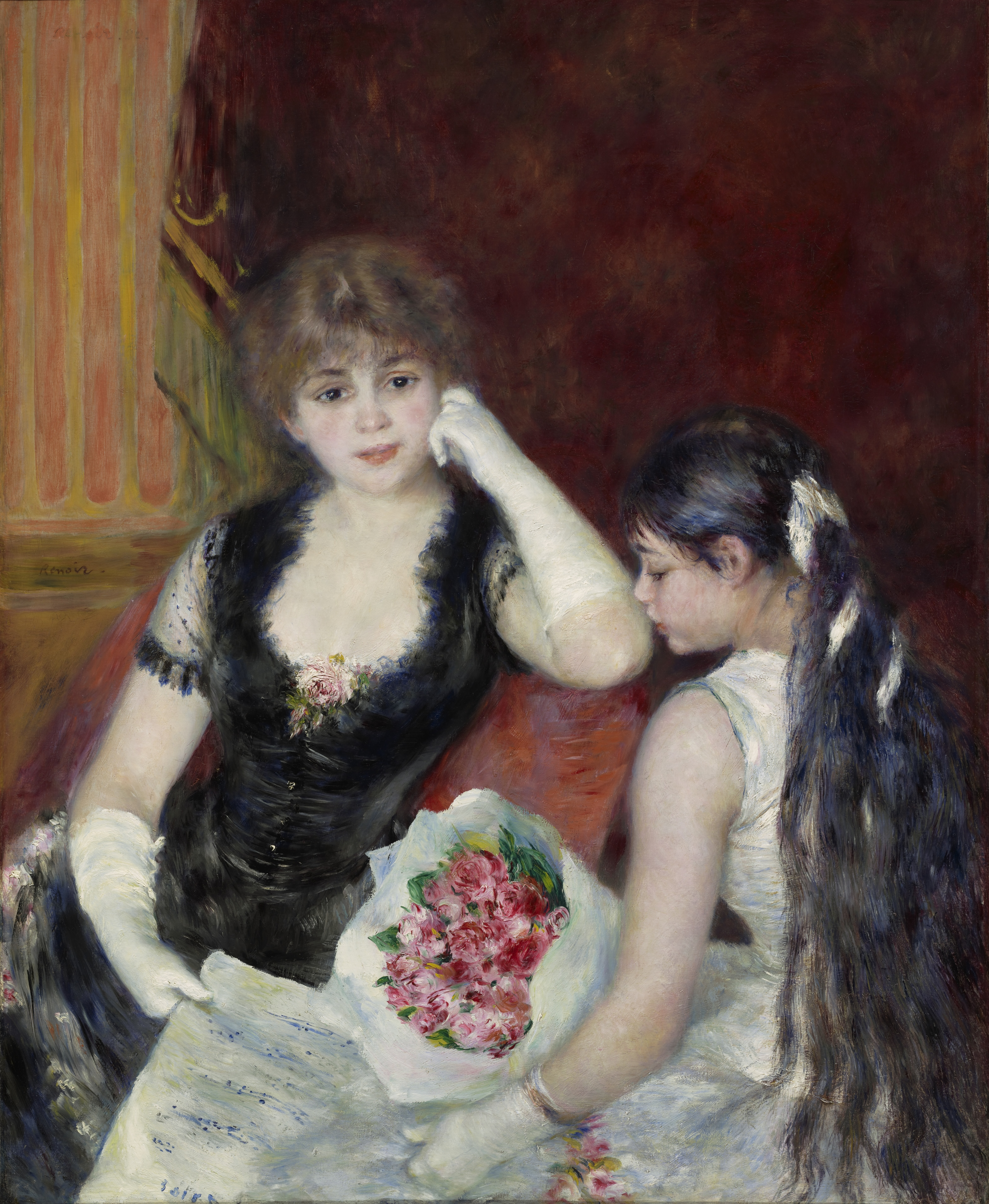
A Box at the Theater (At the Concert), 1880, Clark Art Institute, Williamstown

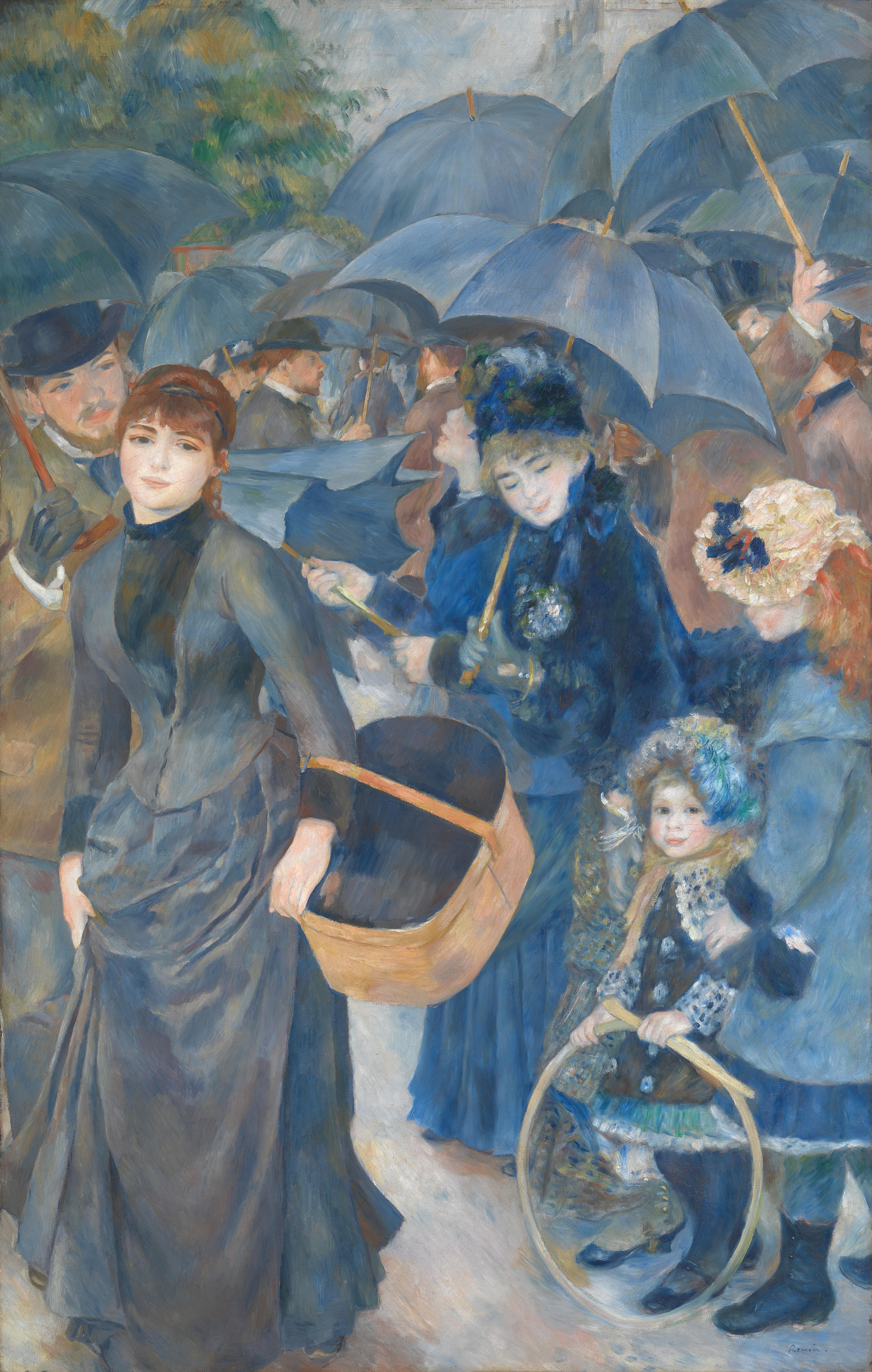
The Umbrellas, c. 1880–1886, National Gallery, London

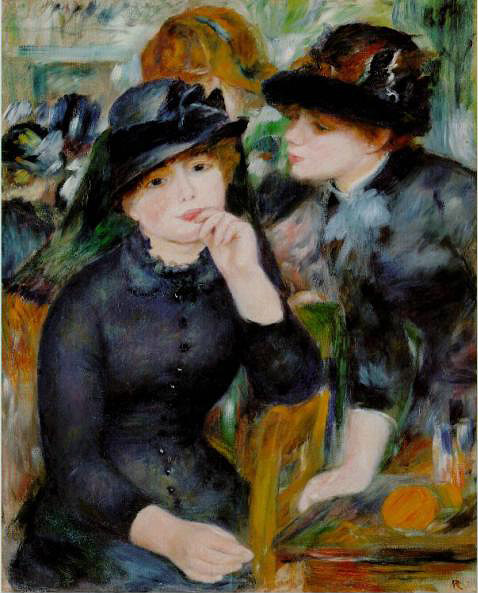
Young Women in Black, c.1880–1882, Pushkin Museum, Moscow

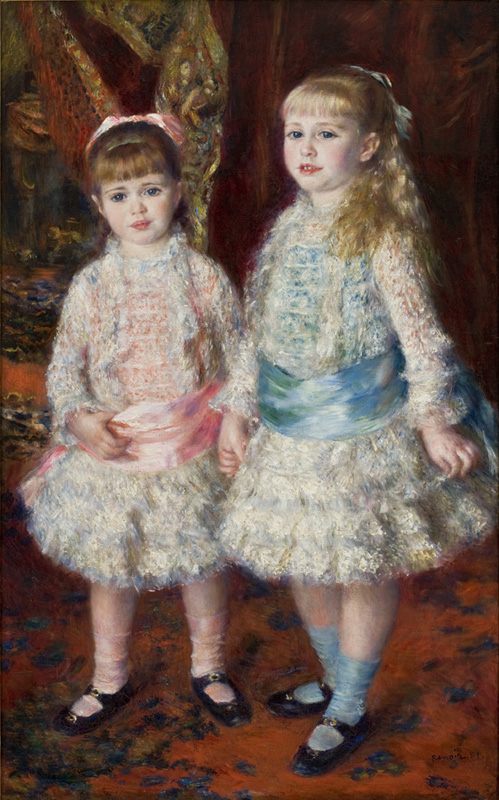
Pink and Blue showing Alice and Elisabeth Cahen d'Anvers, 1881, São Paulo Museum of Art, São Paulo

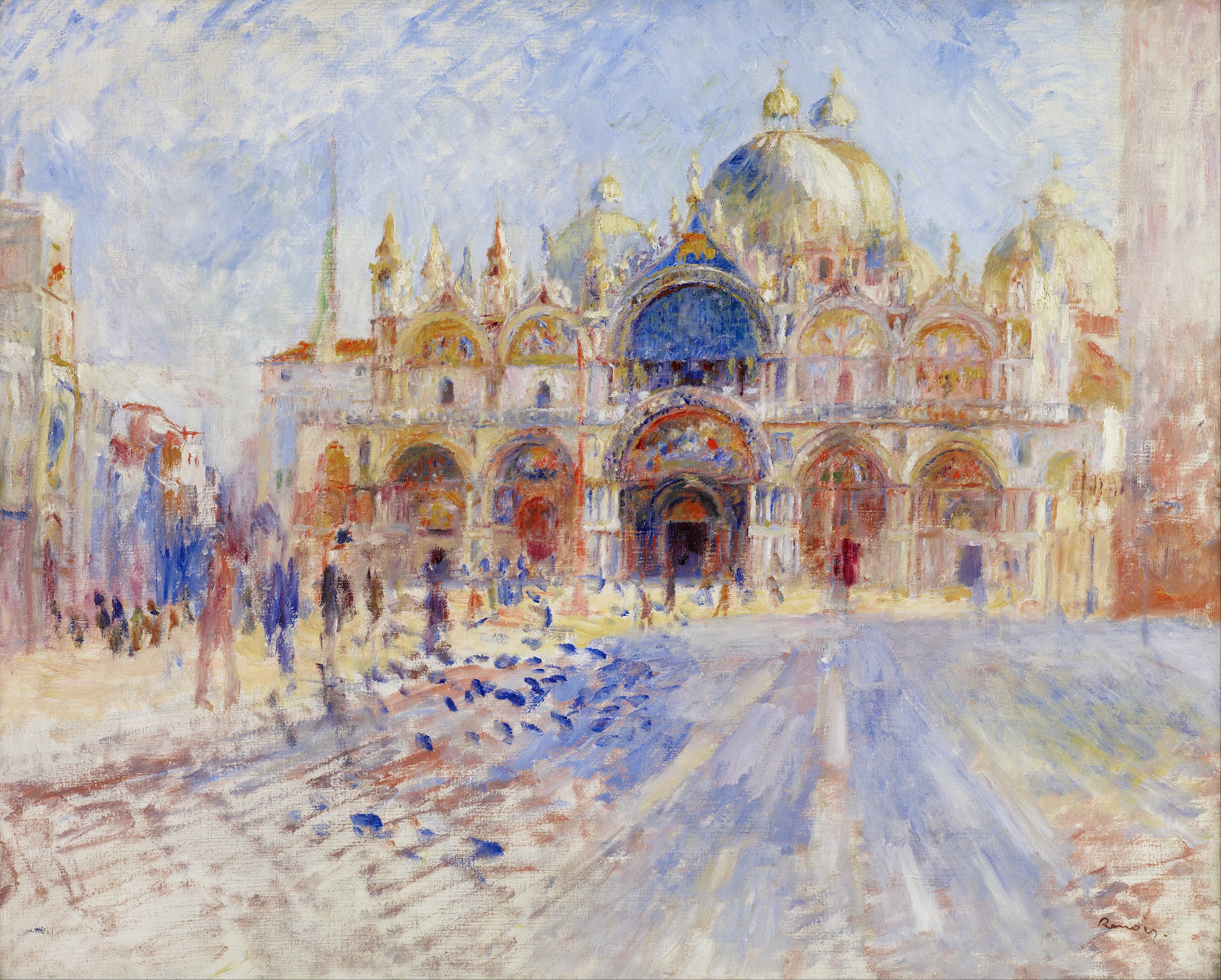
The Piazza San Marco, Venice, 1881 Minneapolis Institute of Art

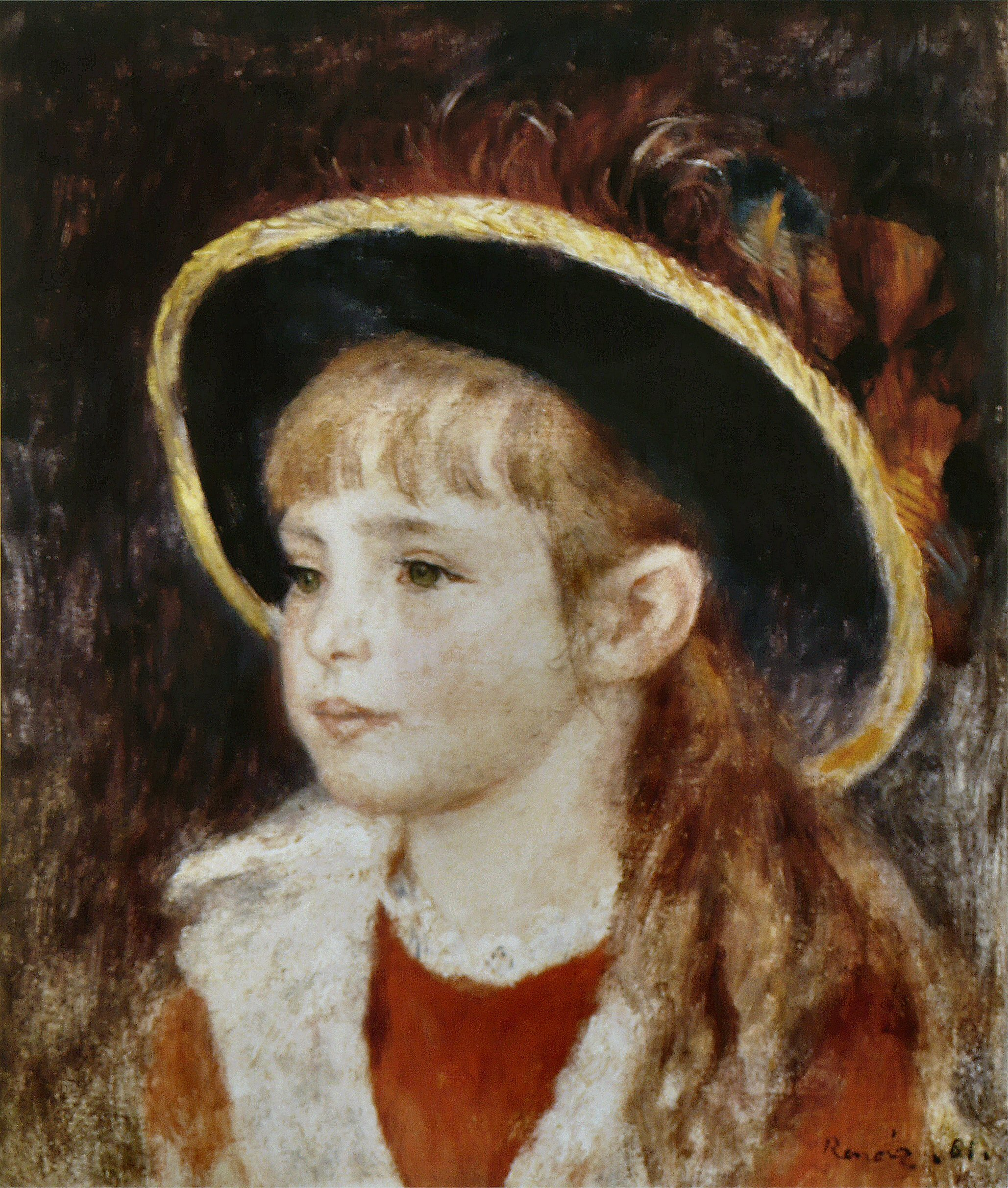
Fillette au chapeau bleu, 1881, (Jane Henriot), private collection

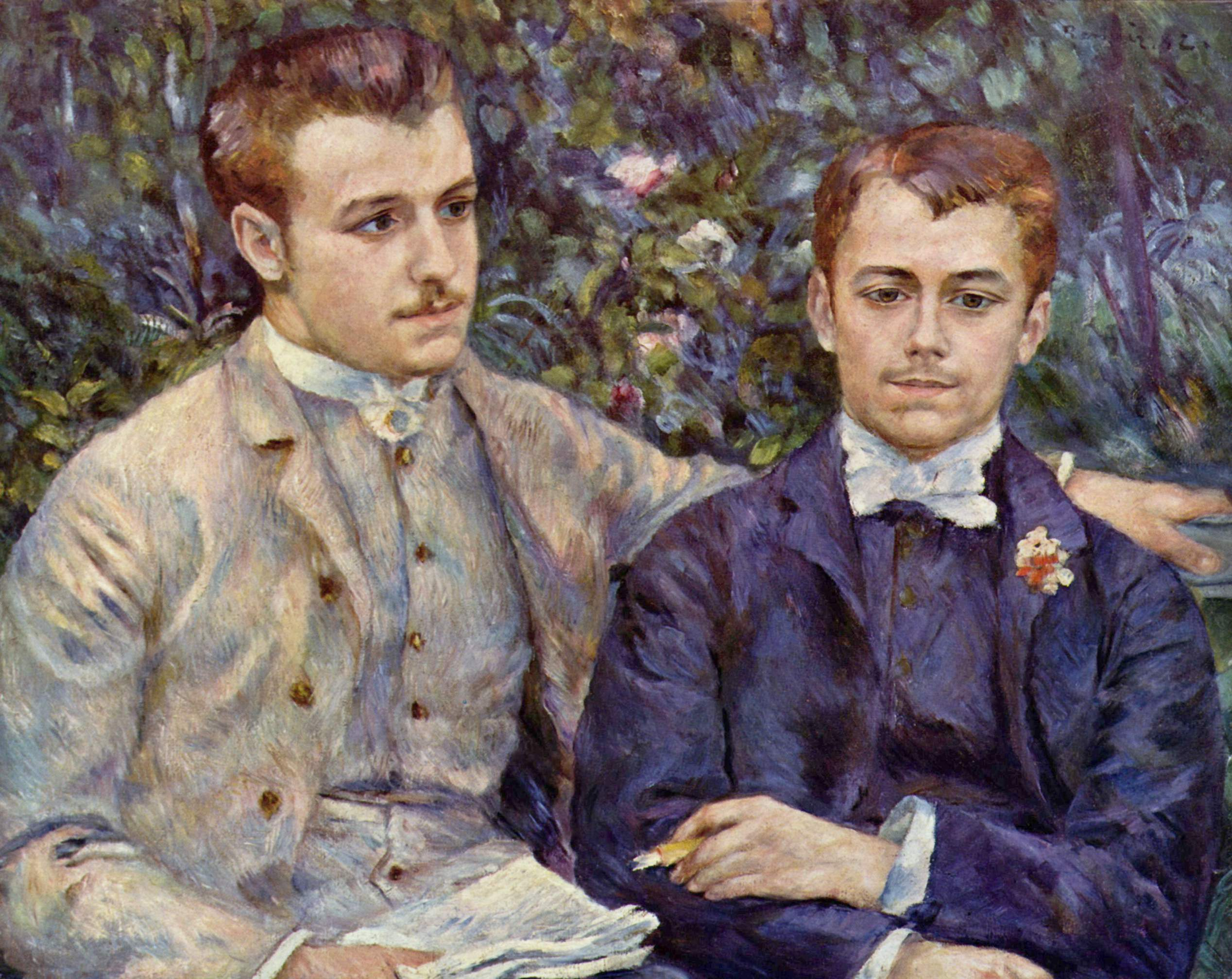
Portrait of Charles and Georges Durand-Ruel, 1882

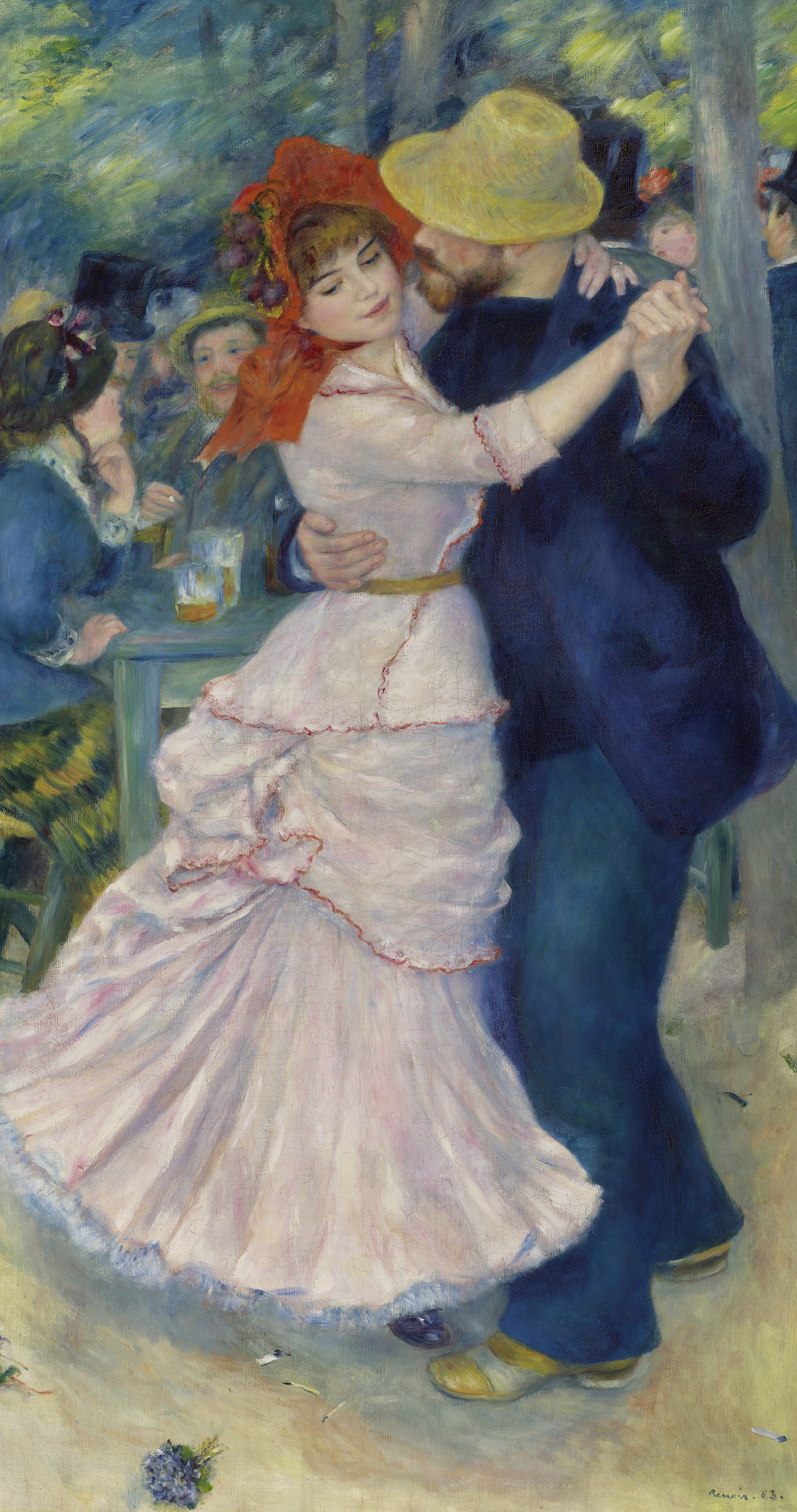
Dance at Bougival, 1882–1883, (woman at left is painter Suzanne Valadon), Boston Museum of Fine Arts

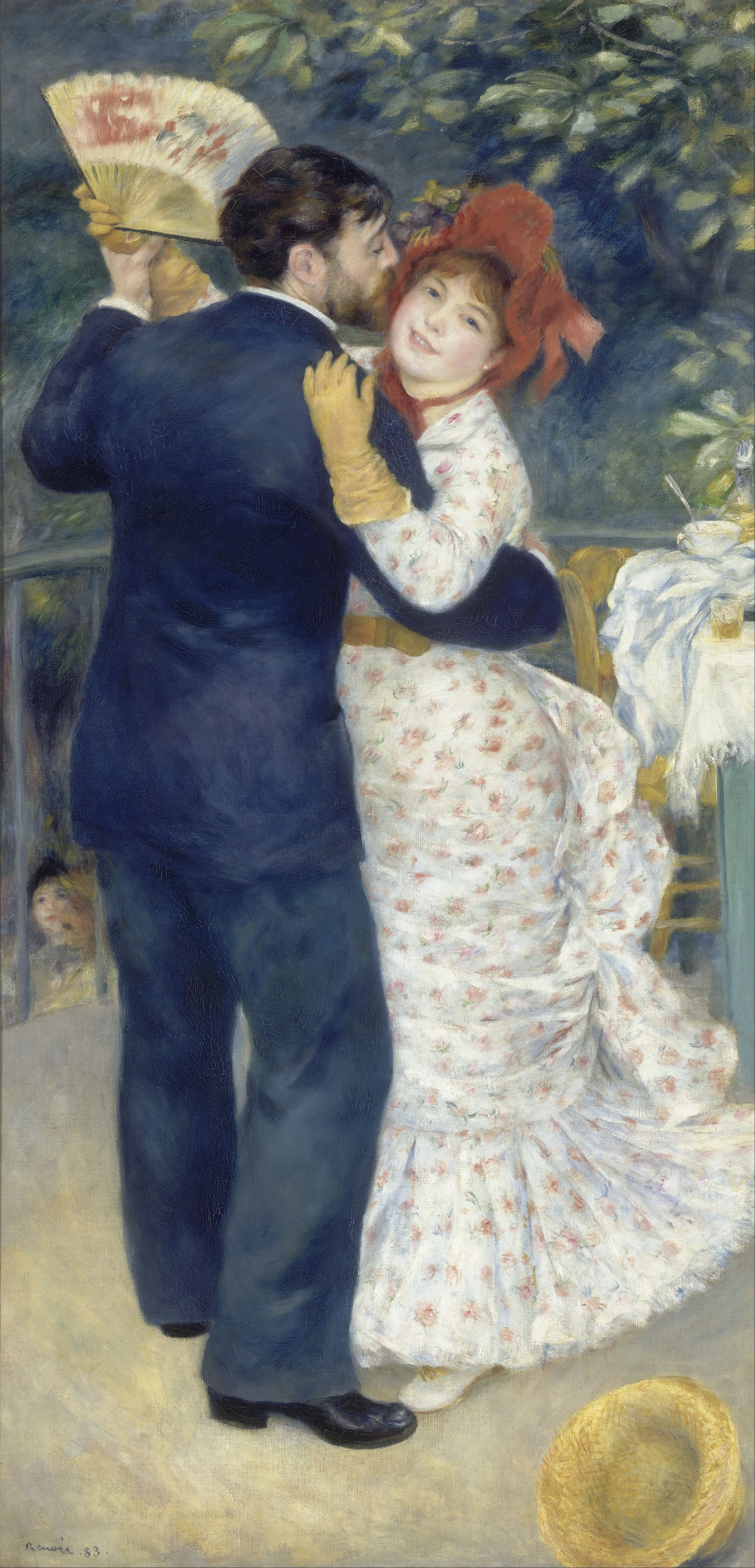
Dance in the Country (Aline Charigot and Paul Lhote), 1883, Musée d'Orsay, Paris

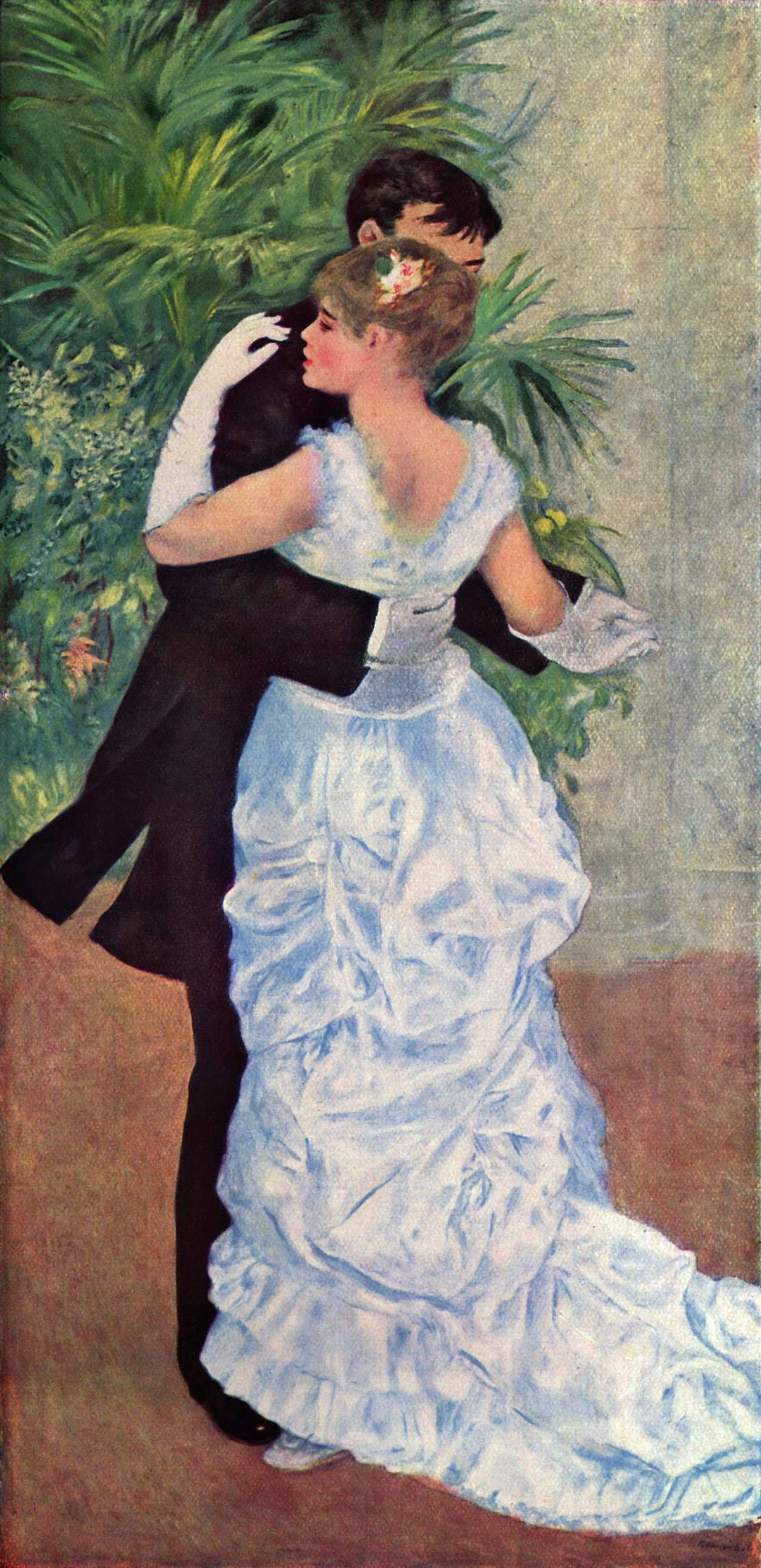
Dance in the City, 1883, Musée d'Orsay, Paris

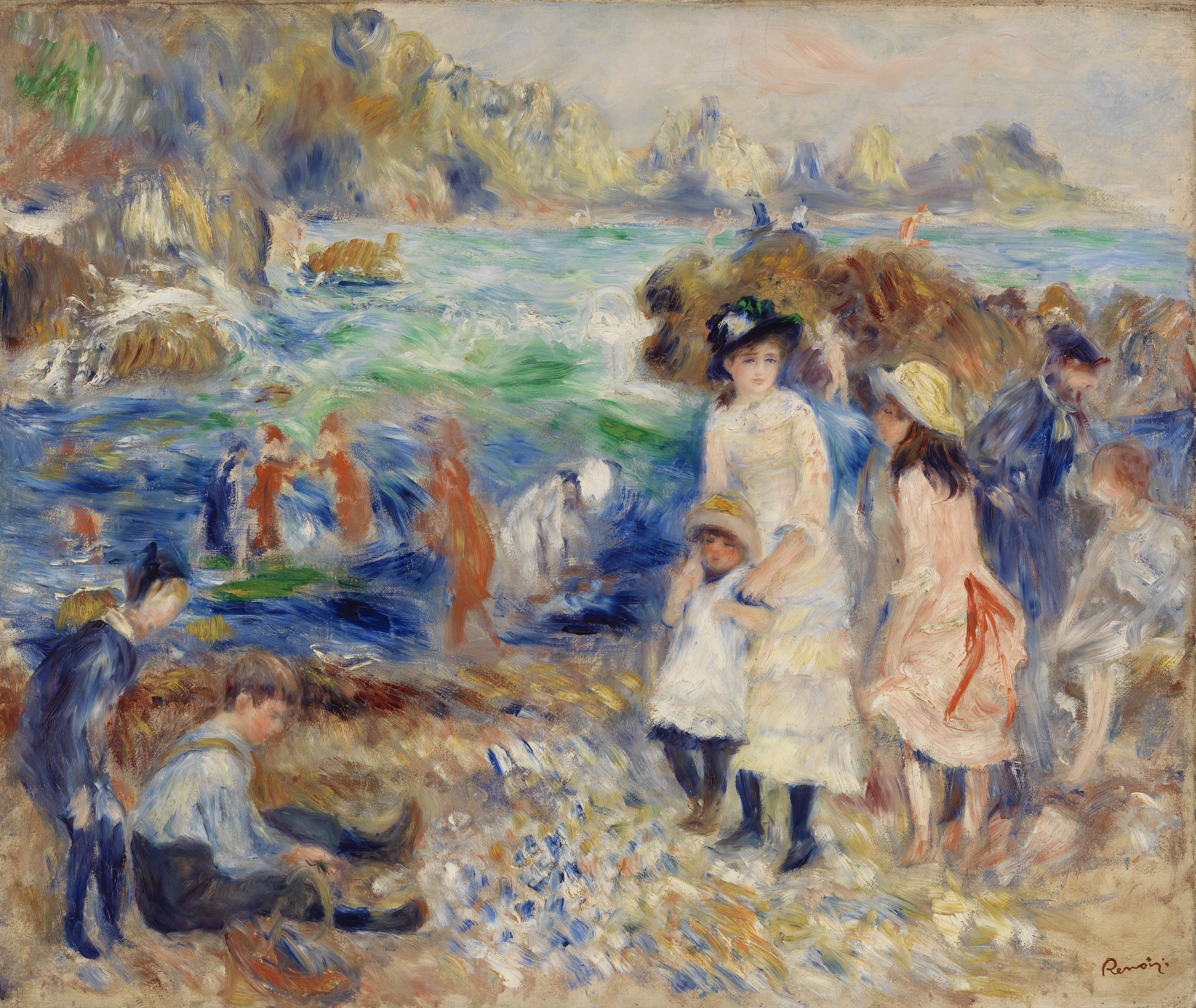
Children at the Beach at Guernsey, 1883, Barnes Foundation, Philadelphia

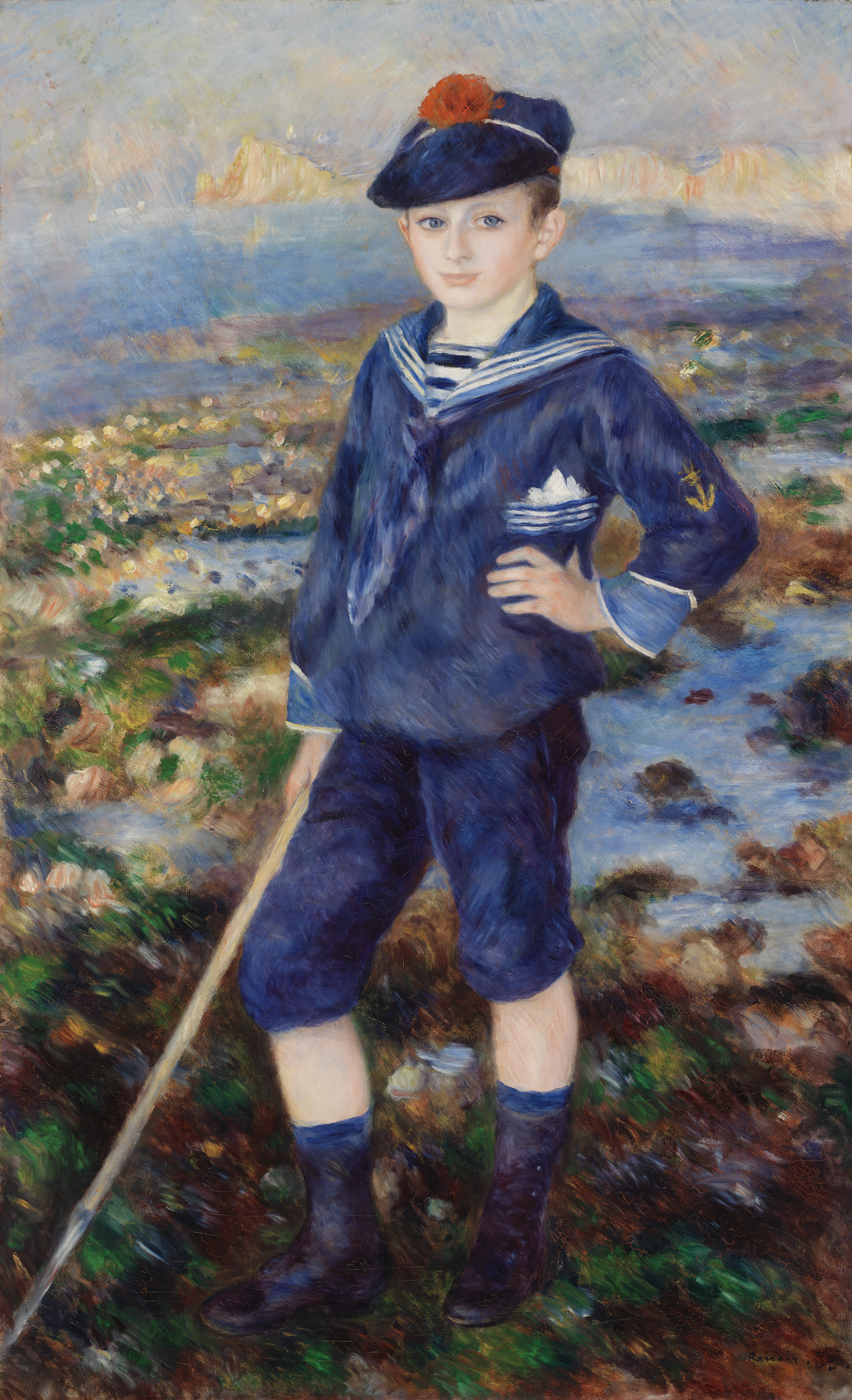
Jeune garçon sur la plage d'Yport, 1883, Barnes Foundation, Philadelphia

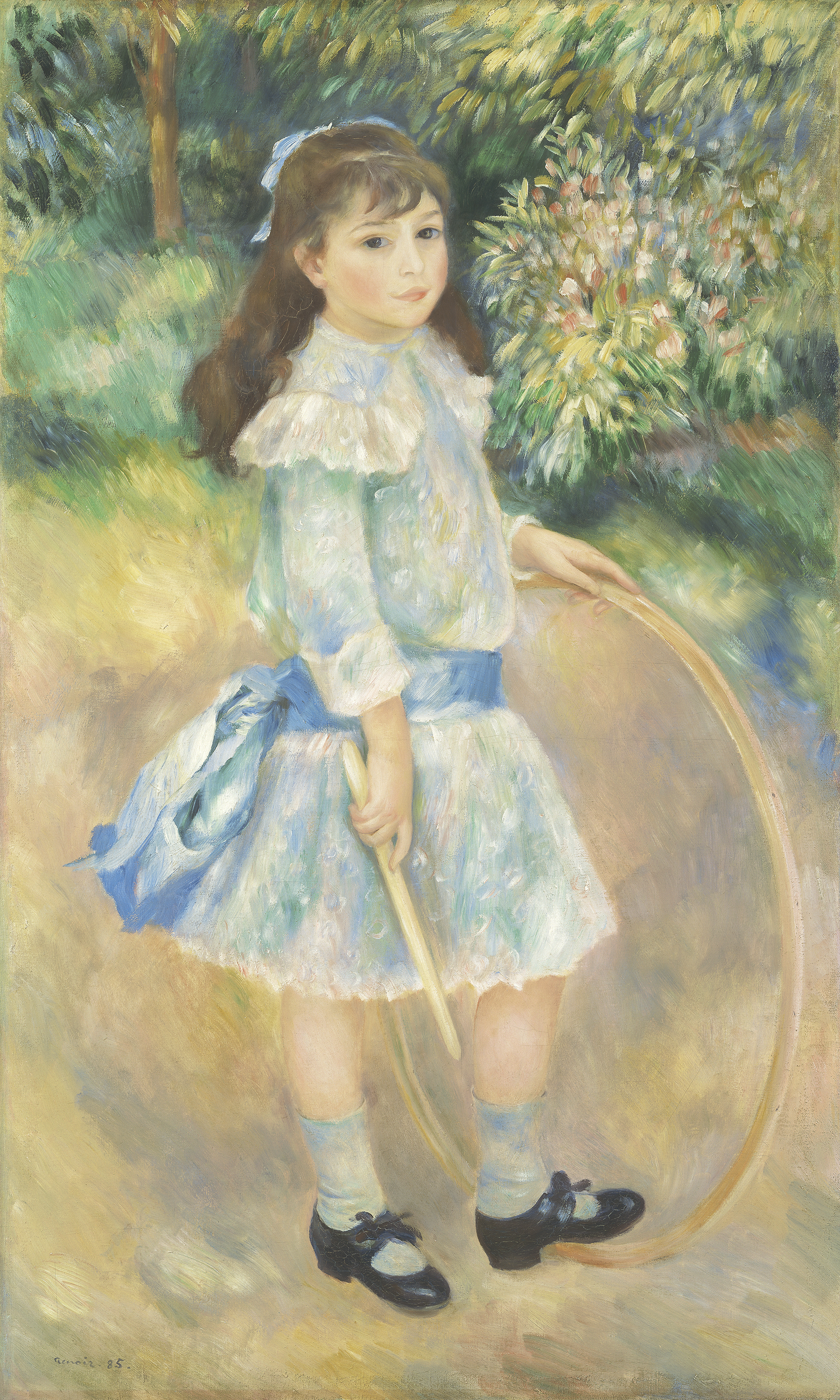
Girl With a Hoop, 1885, National Gallery of Art, Washington, D.C.

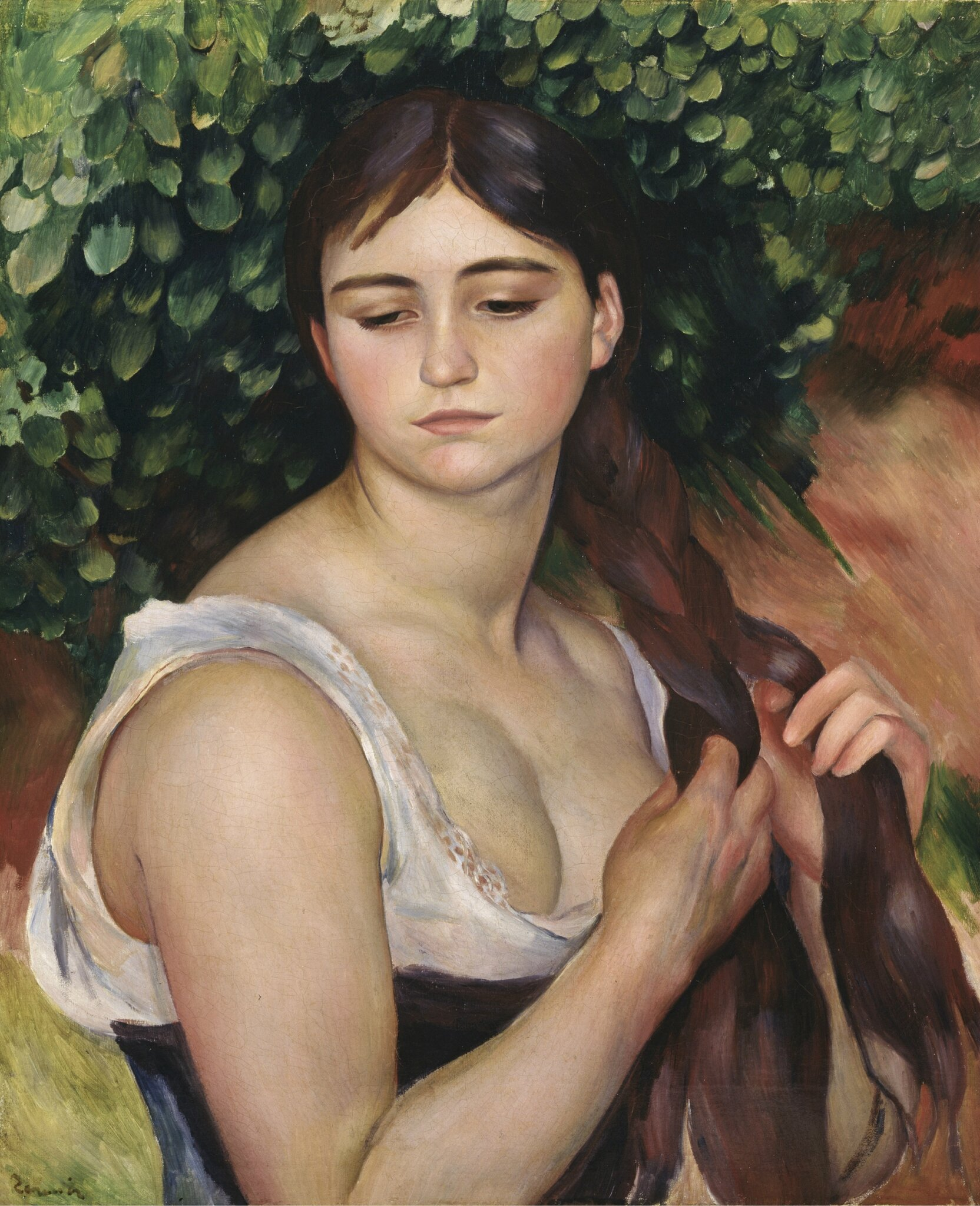
Girl Braiding Her Hair (Suzanne Valadon), 1885, Langmatt Museum, Baden

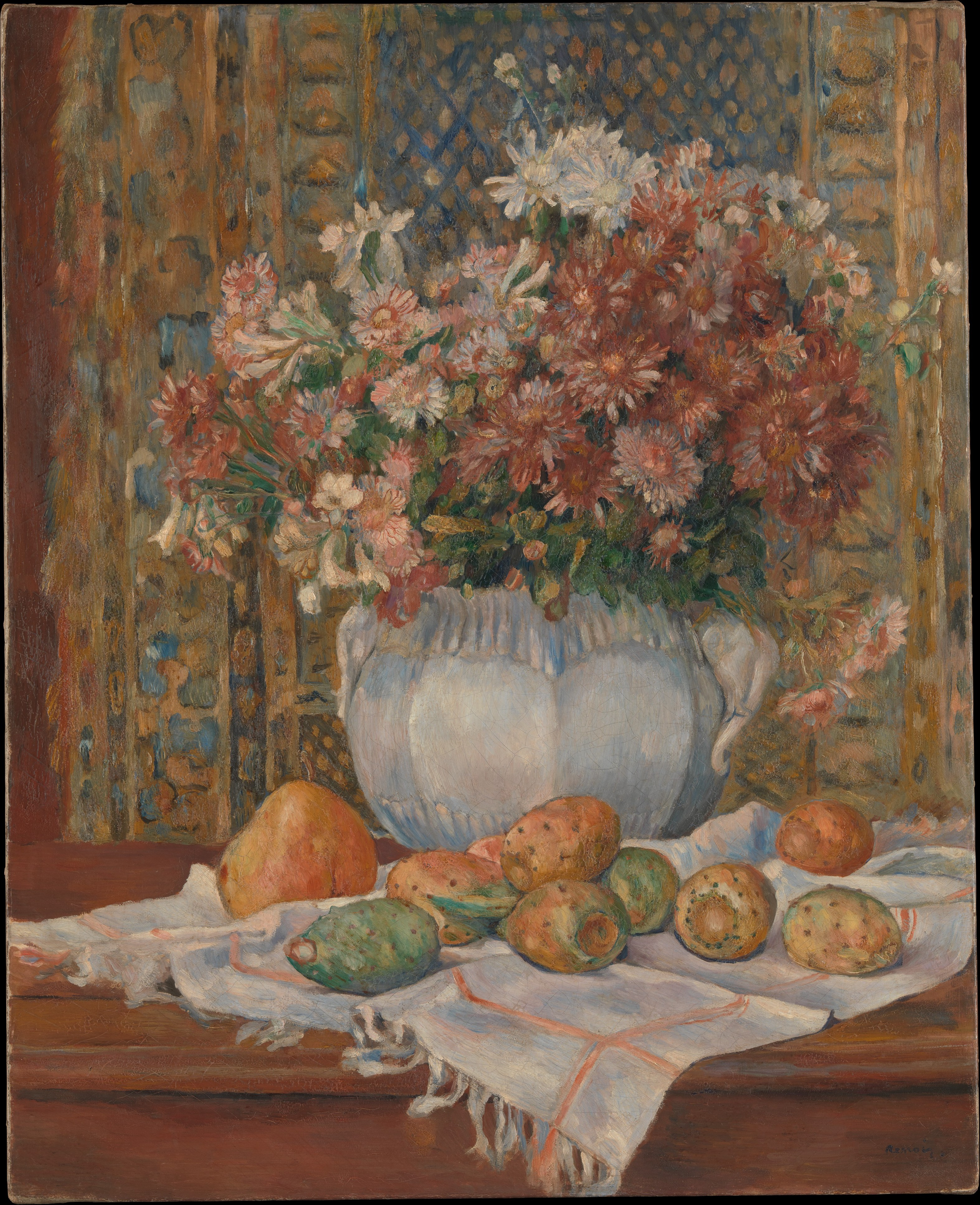
Still Life with Flowers and Prickly Pears, 1885, Metropolitan Museum of Art, New York

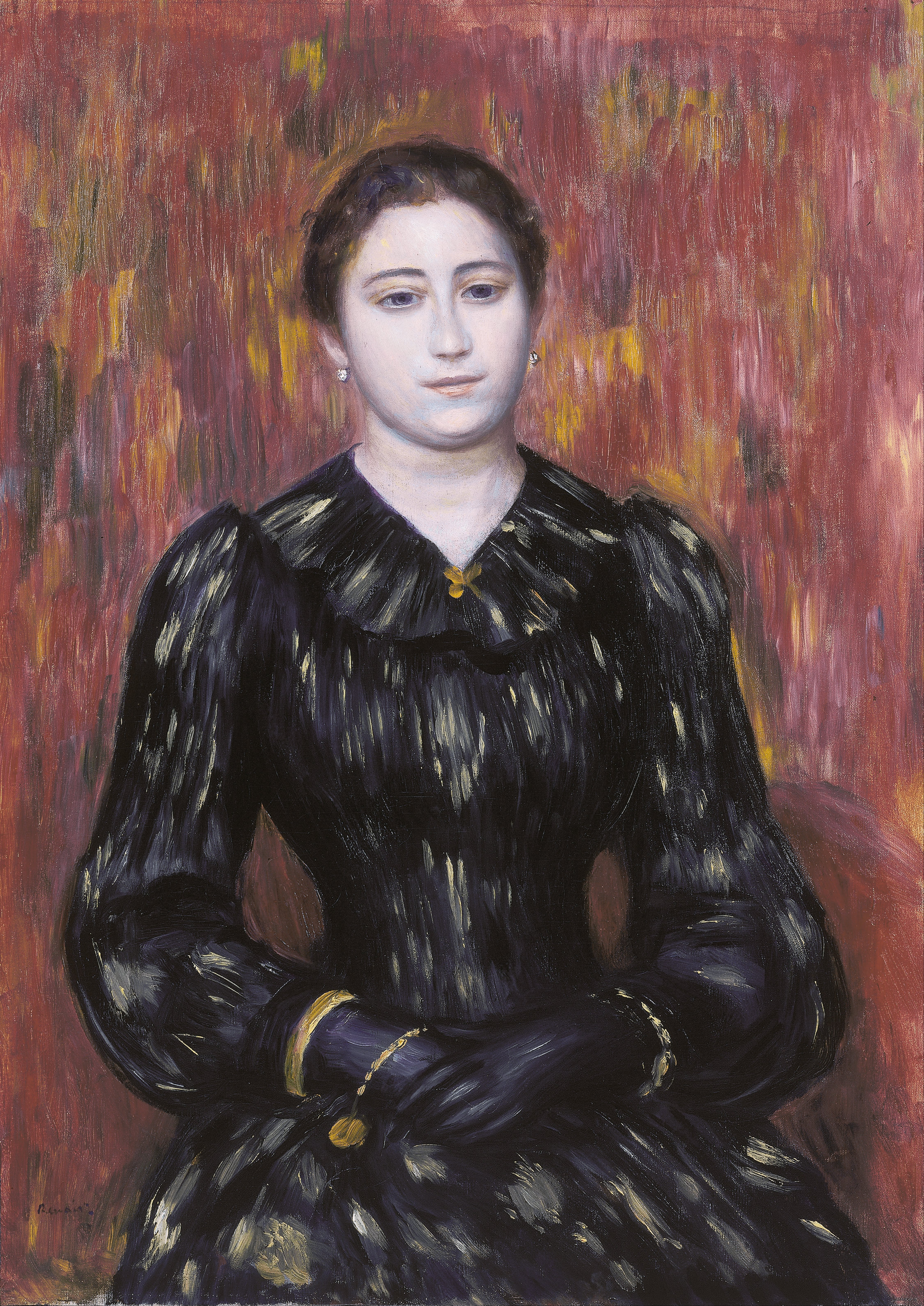
Portrait of madame Paulin, c. 1885–1890, Israel Museum, Jerusalem

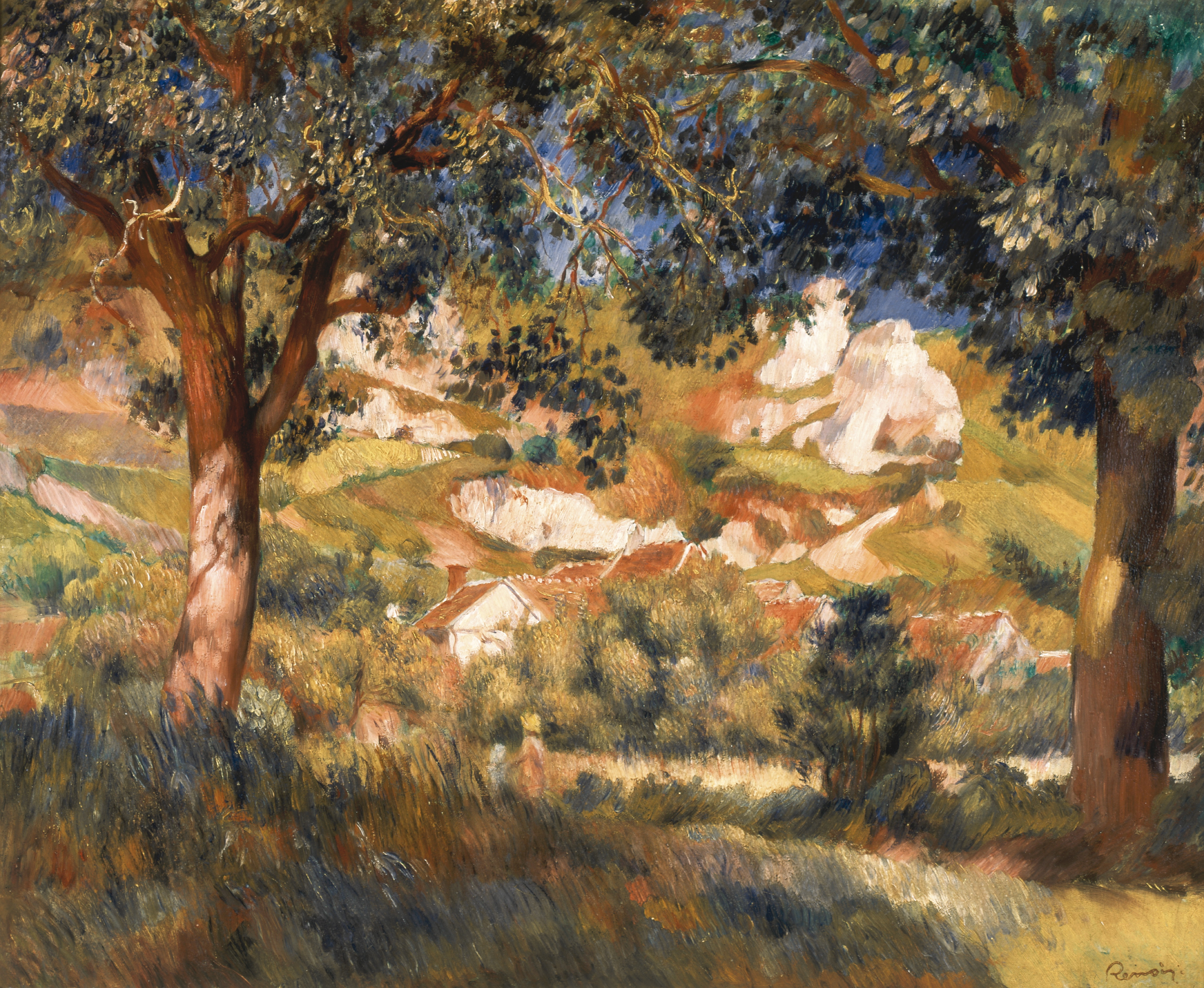
Paysage à La Roche-Guyon, c. 1887, Pérez Simón Collection, Mexico City

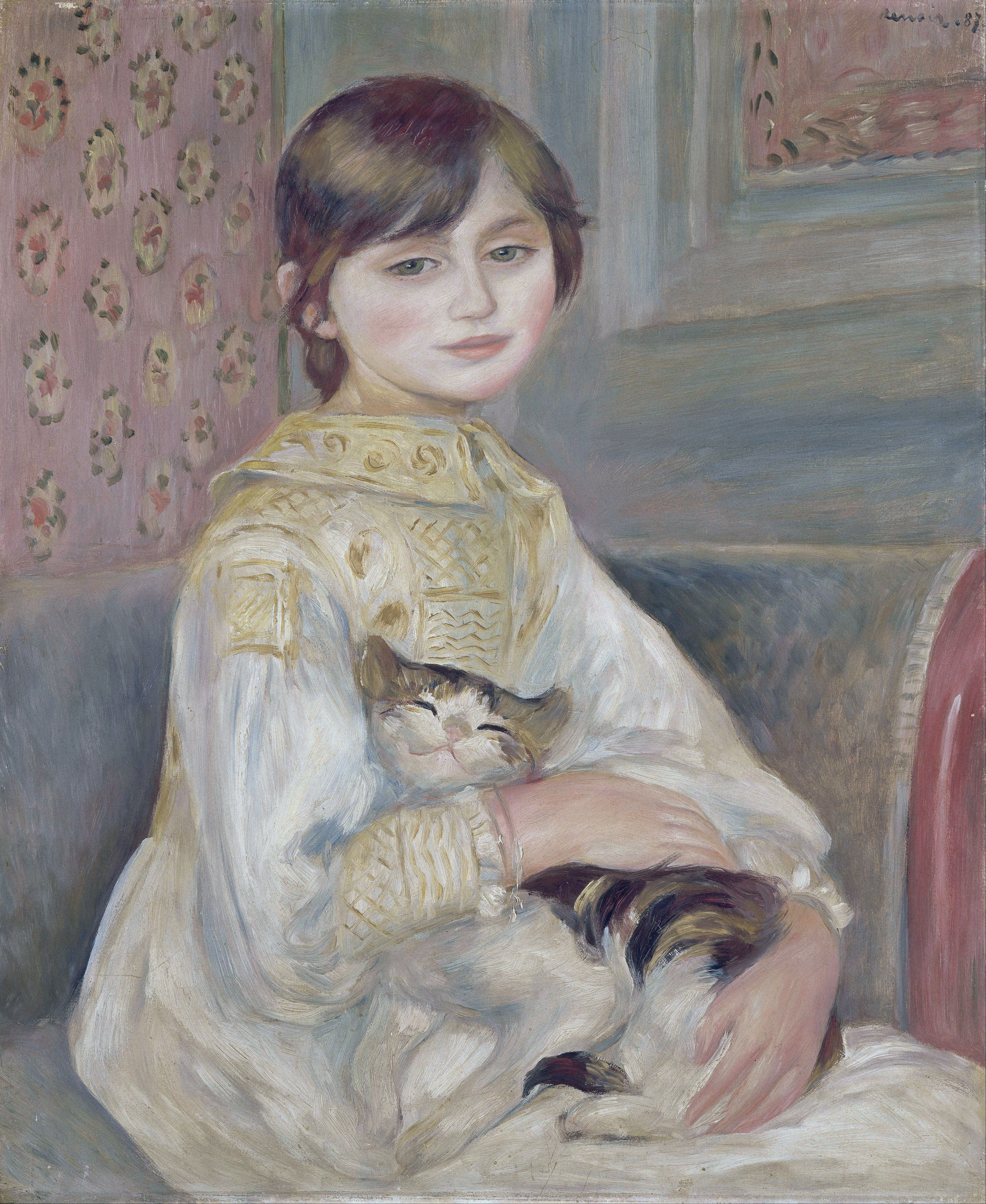
Julie Manet with cat, 1887, Musée d'Orsay, Paris

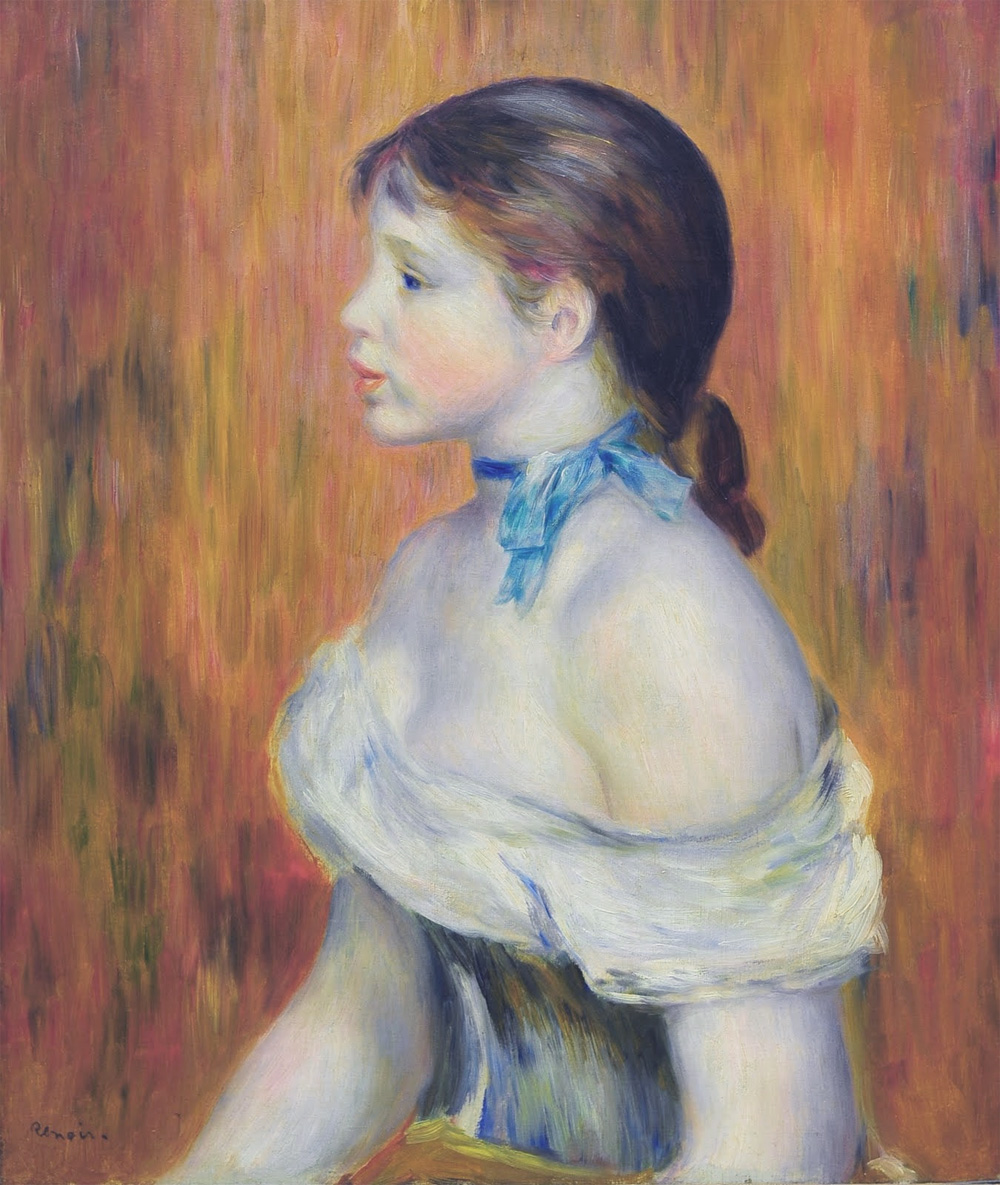
Young Woman with a Blue Choker, 1888, Museum of Fine Arts of Lyon

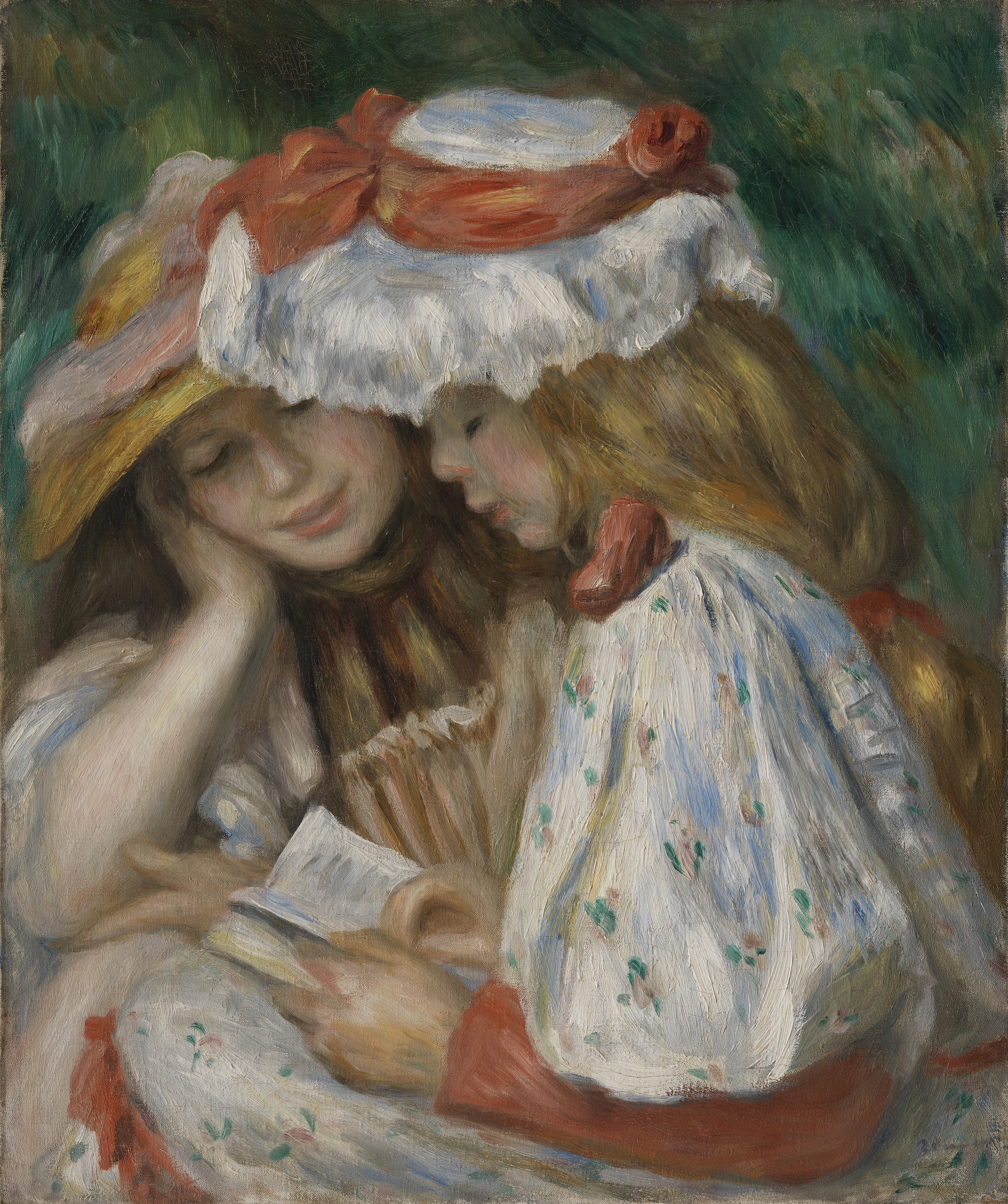
Girls Reading, c. 1890–1891, LACMA, Los Angeles

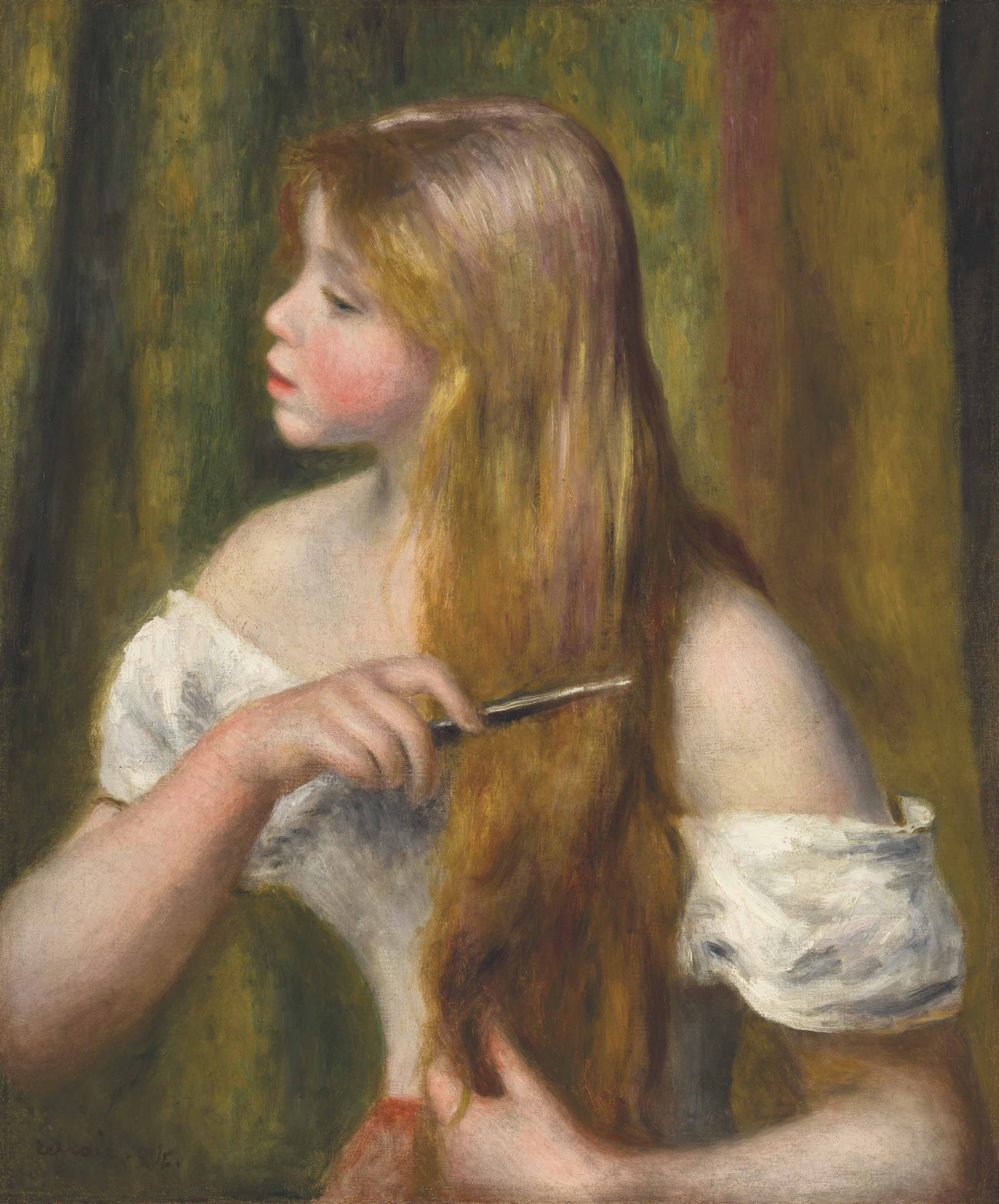
Young Girl with Red Hair, 1894, Private Collection

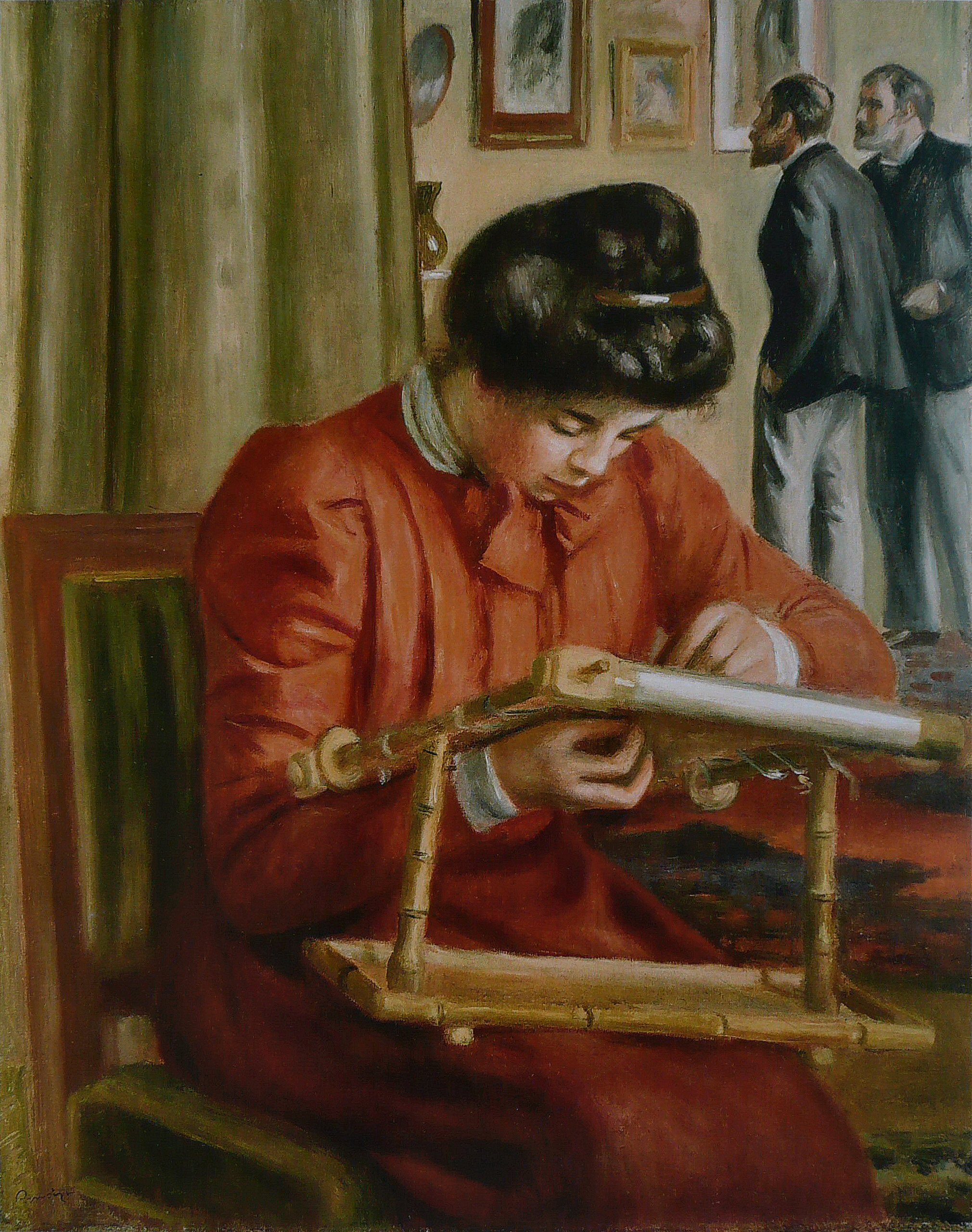
Christine Lerolle Embroidering, 1895, Columbus Museum of Art

Gabrielle Renard and infant son Jean Renoir, 1895, Musée de l'Orangerie, Paris

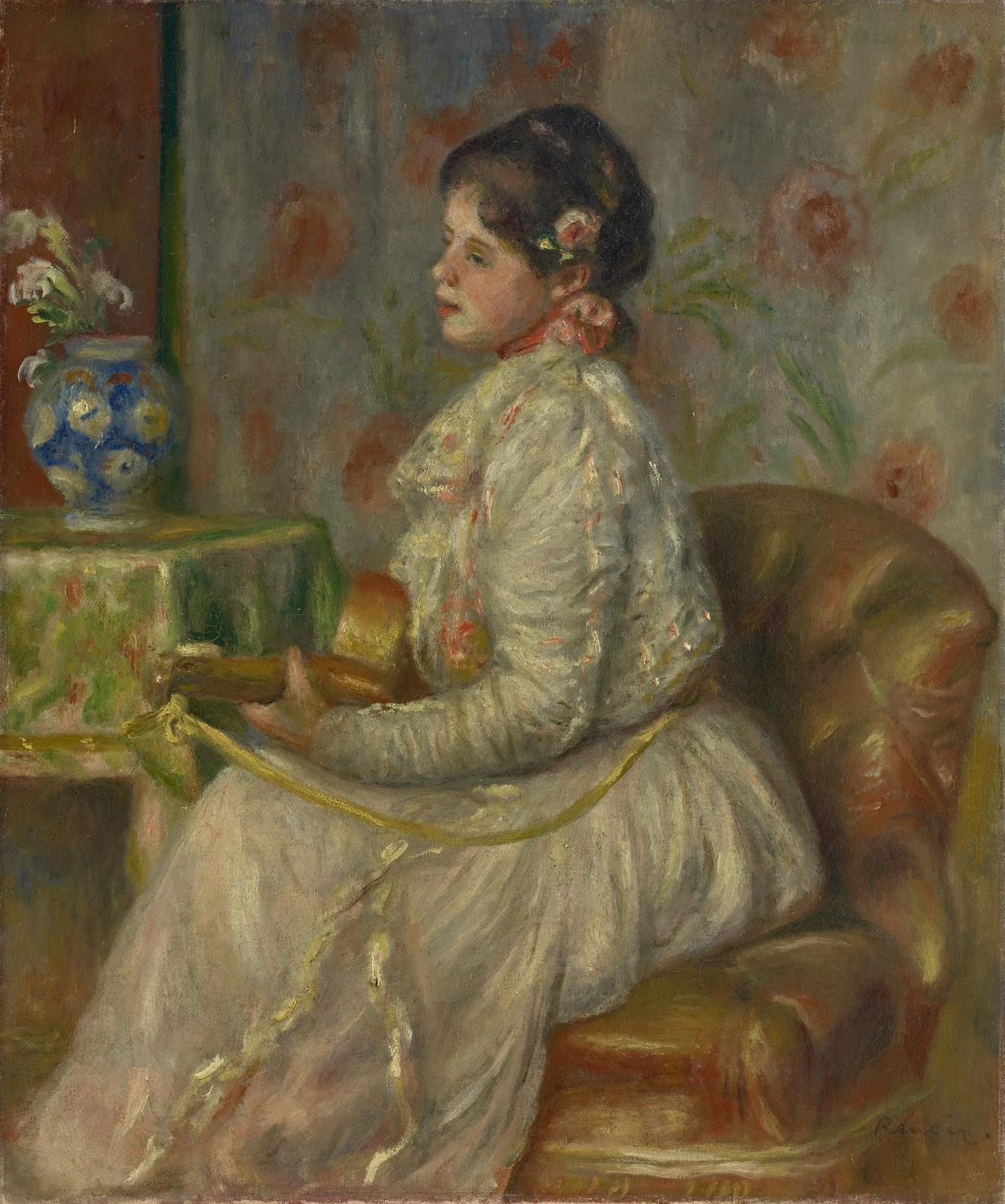
The guitar player, 1896, National Gallery of Victoria, Melbourne

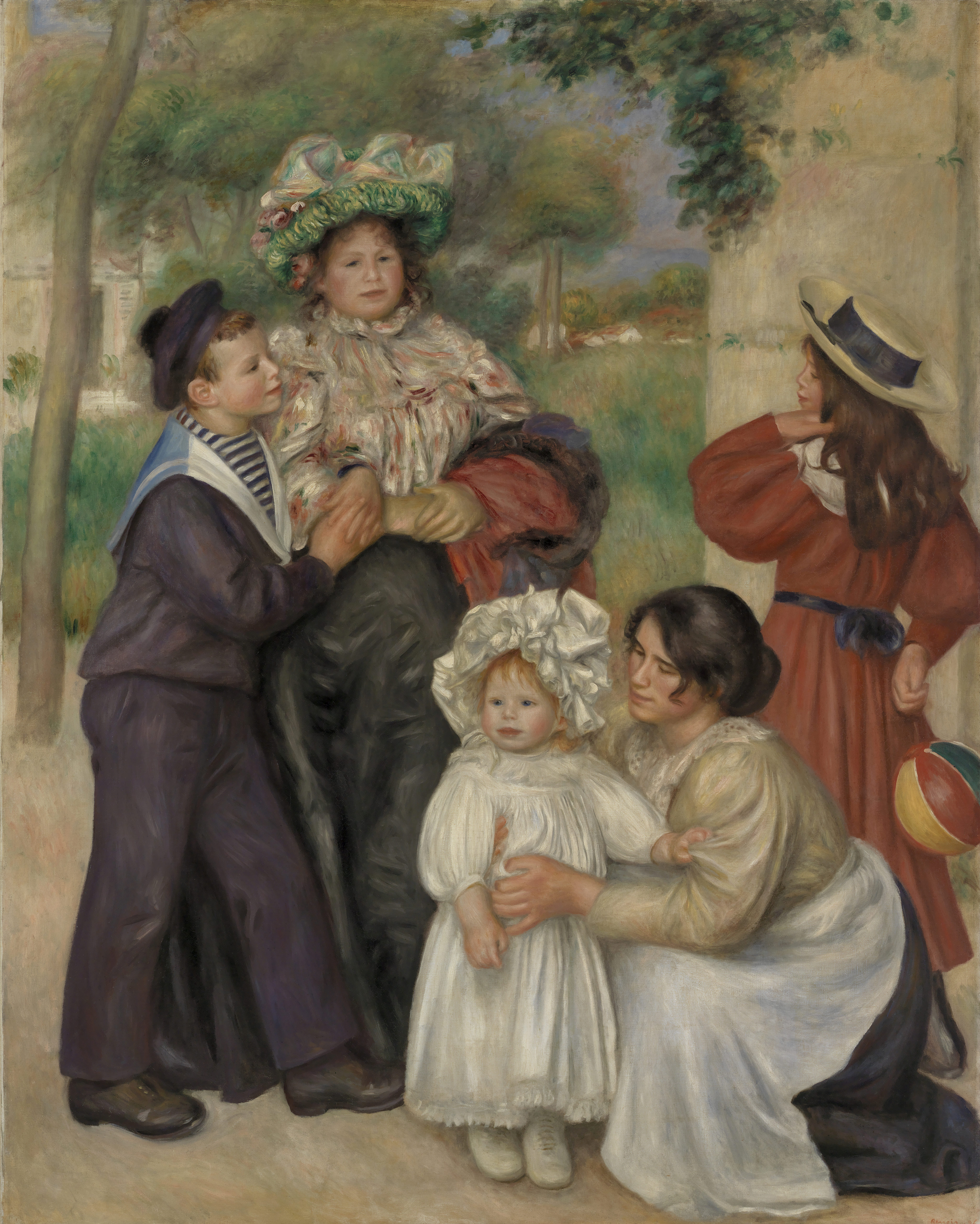
The Artist's Family, 1896, The Barnes Foundation, Philadelphia

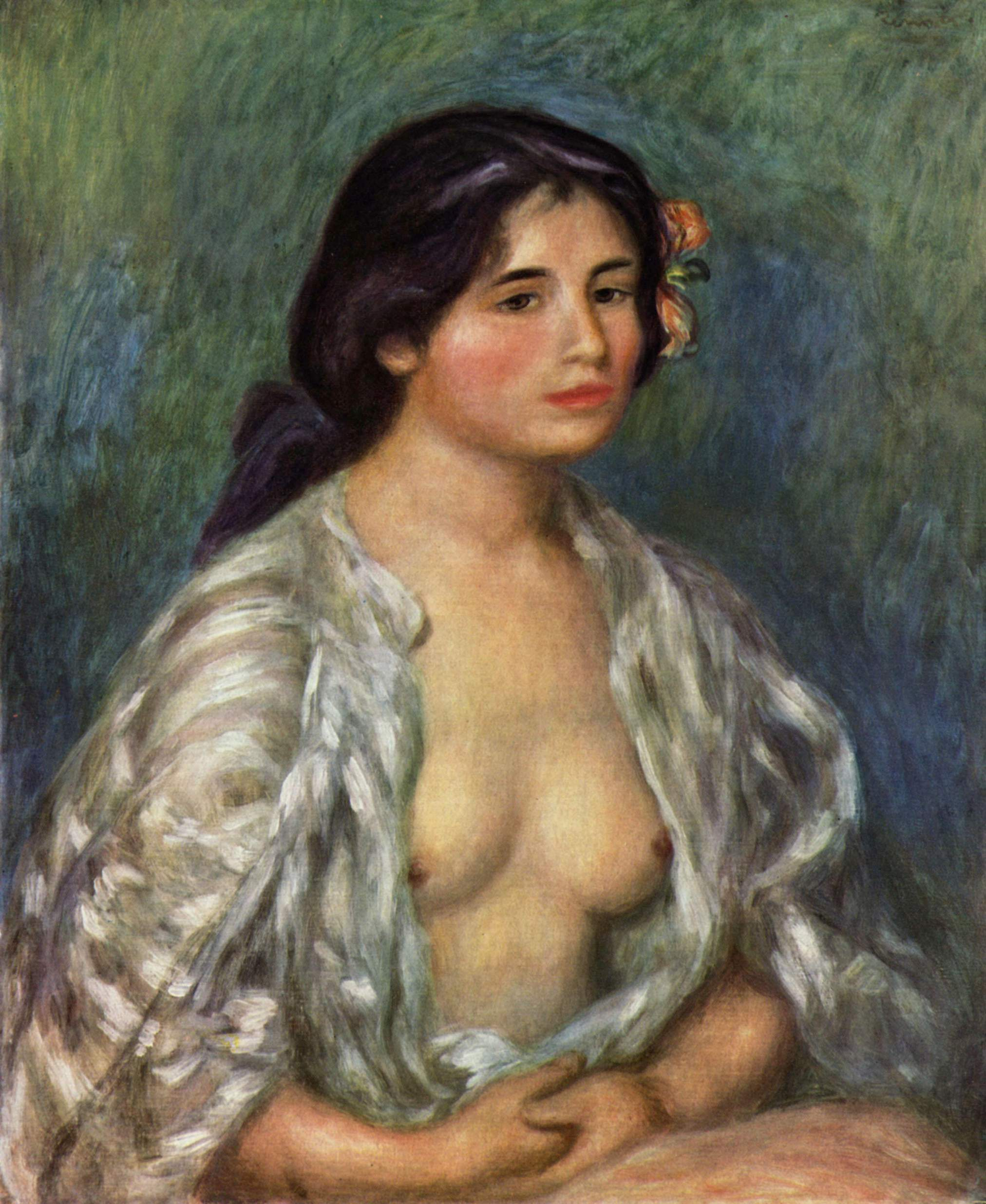
Gabrielle with Open Blouse, 1907, Tehran Museum of Contemporary Art

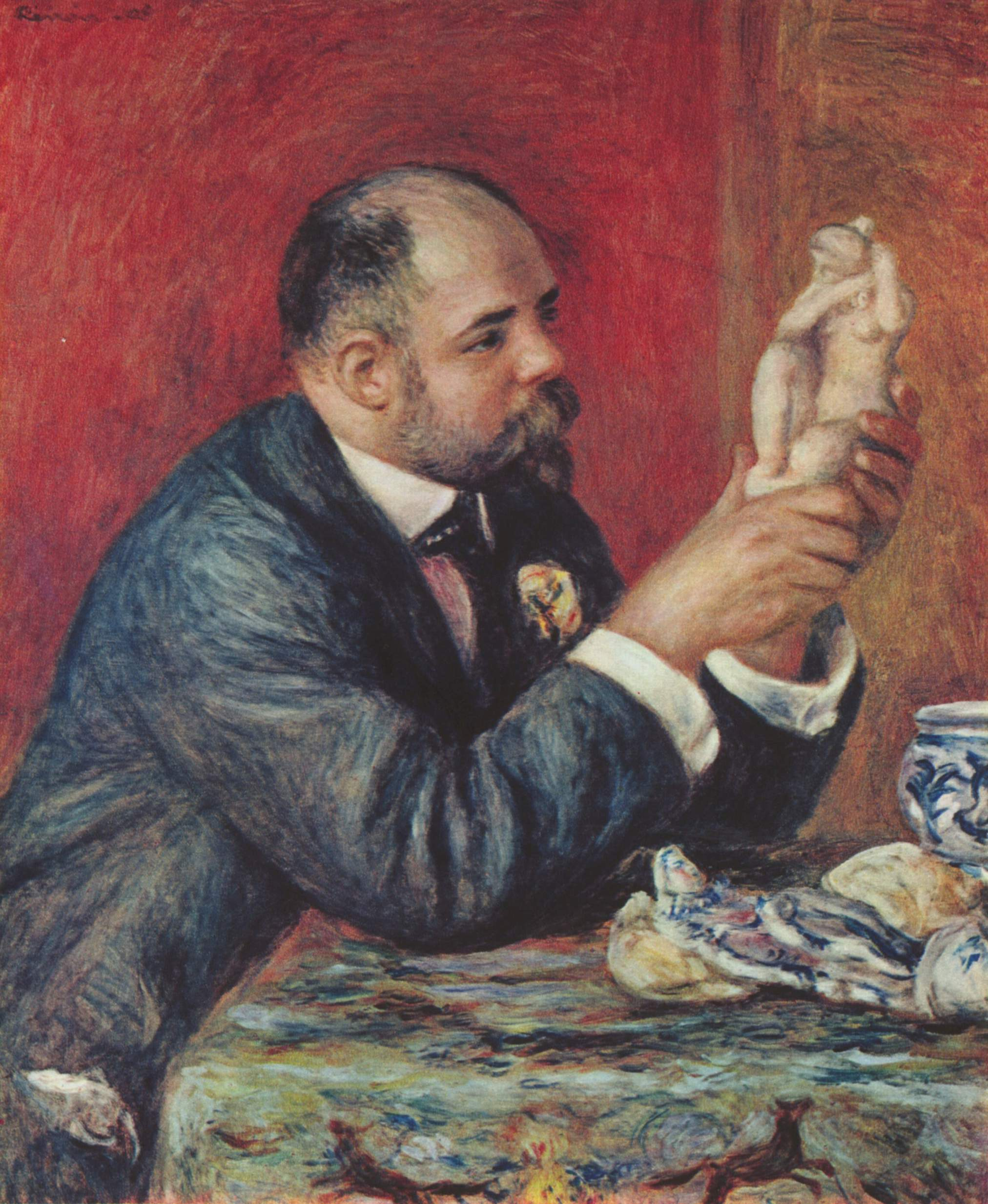
Portrait of Ambroise Vollard, 1908, Courtauld Institute of Art, London

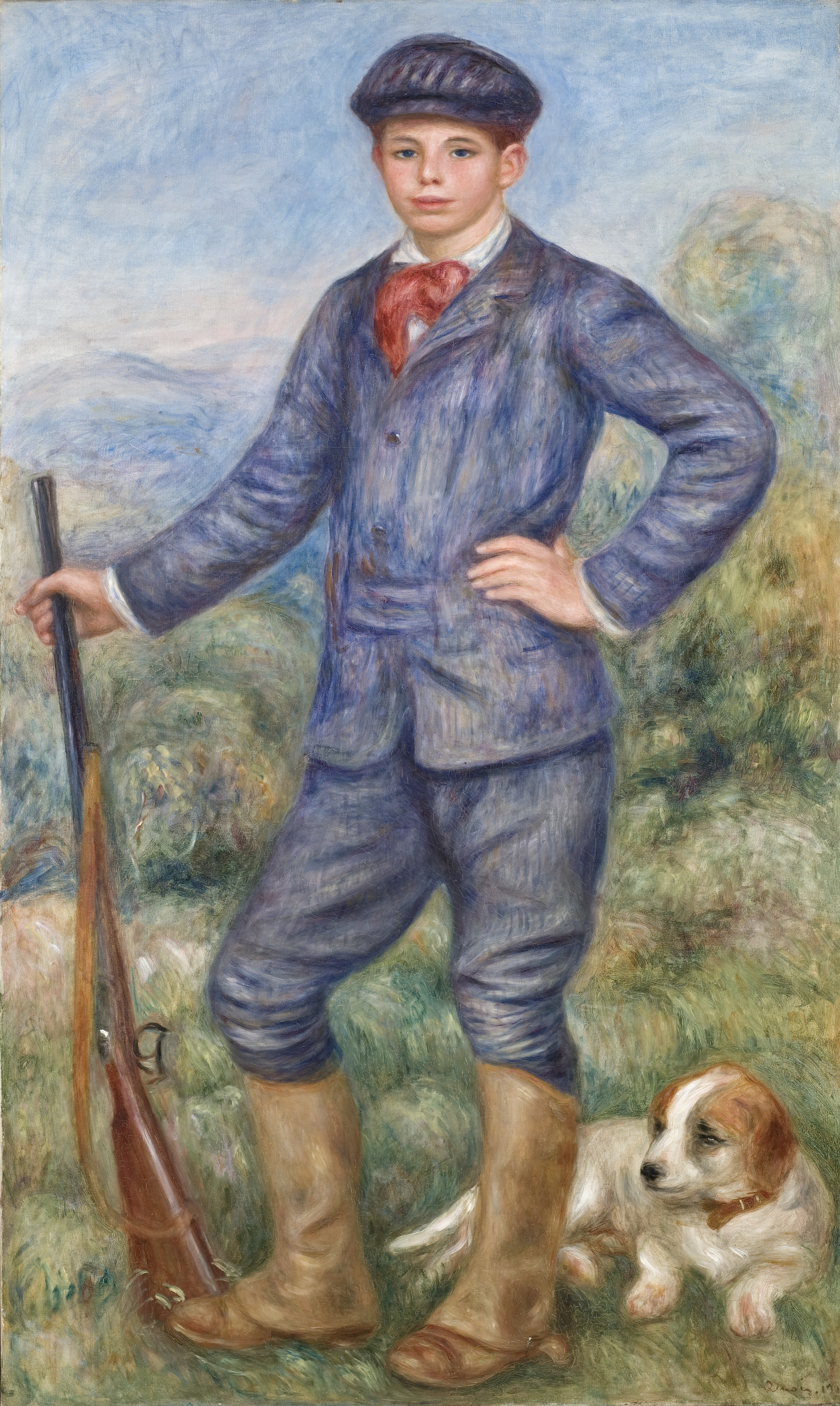
Portrait of Jean Renoir as a Huntsman, 1910, LACMA, Los Angeles

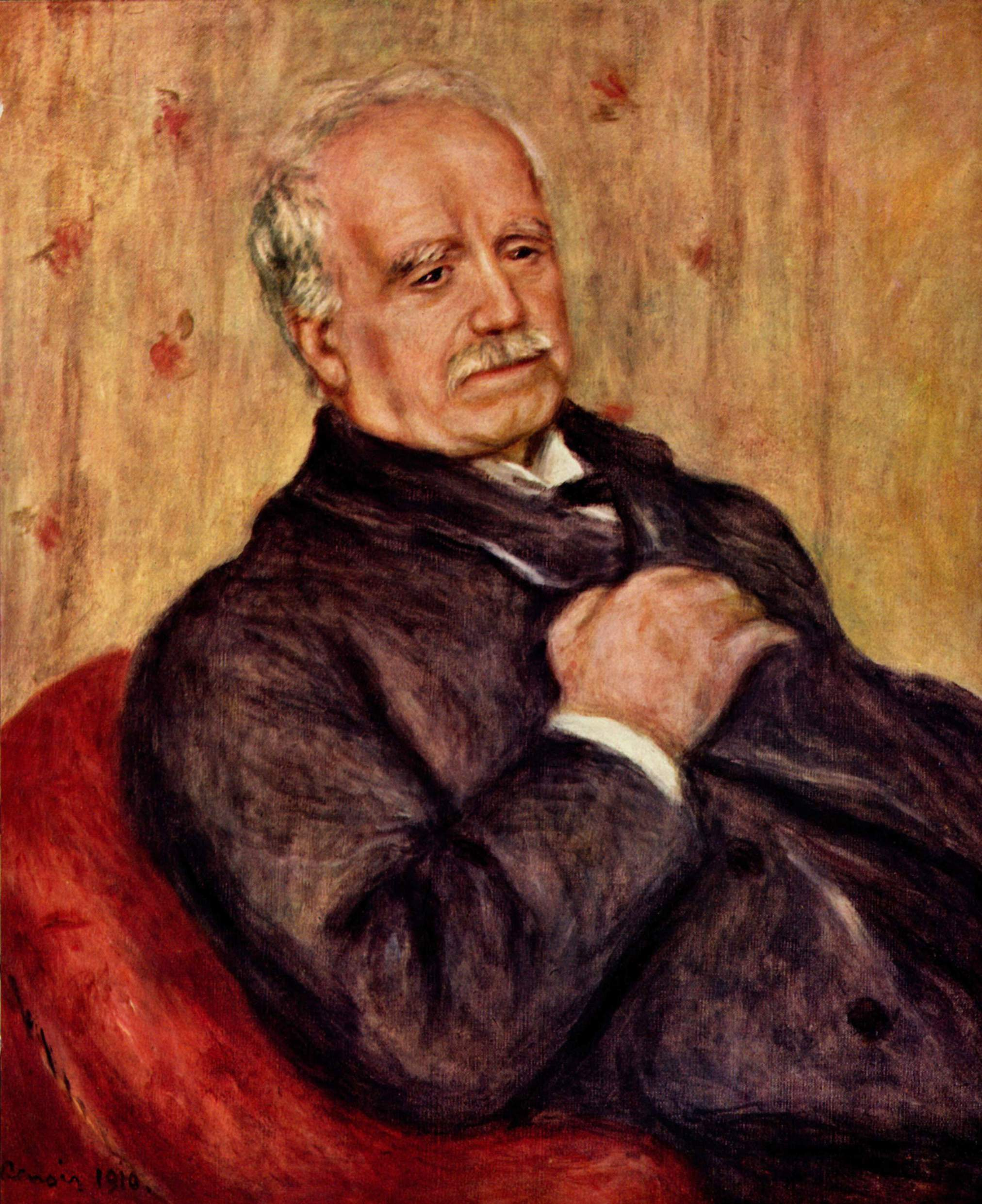
Portrait of Paul Durand-Ruel, 1910

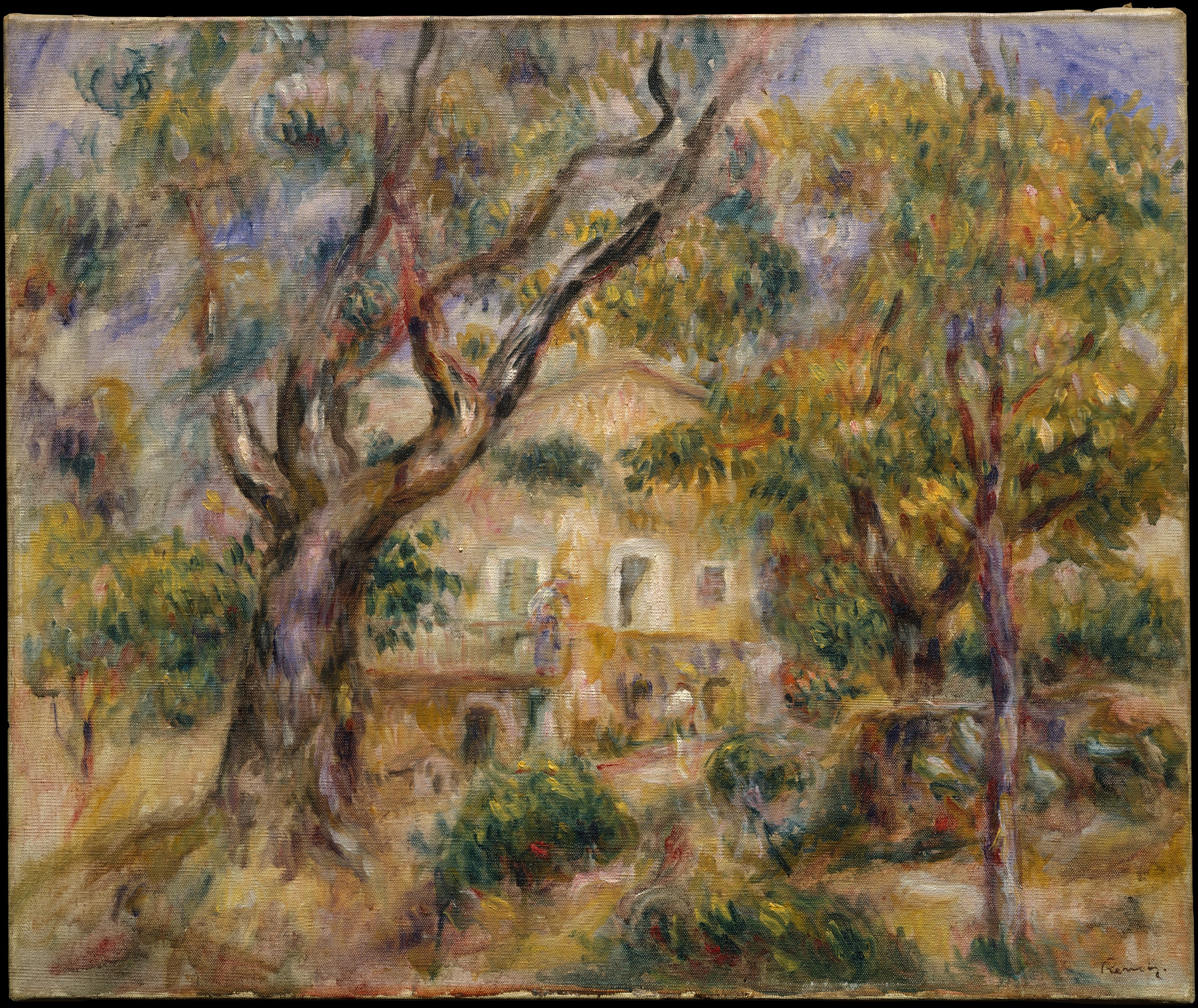
The Farm at Les Collettes, Cagnes, c. 1908–1914, Metropolitan Museum of Art, New York

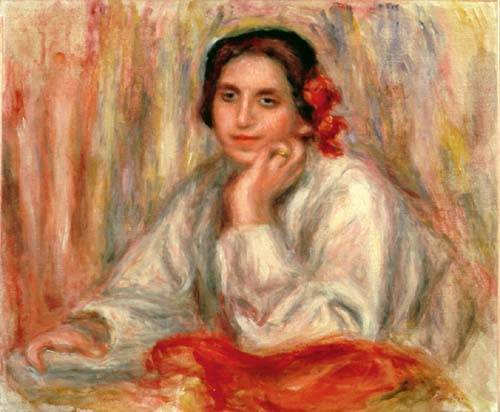
Portrait of Vera Sergine Renoir, 1918, Botero Museum, Bogotá

=== Self-portraits ===
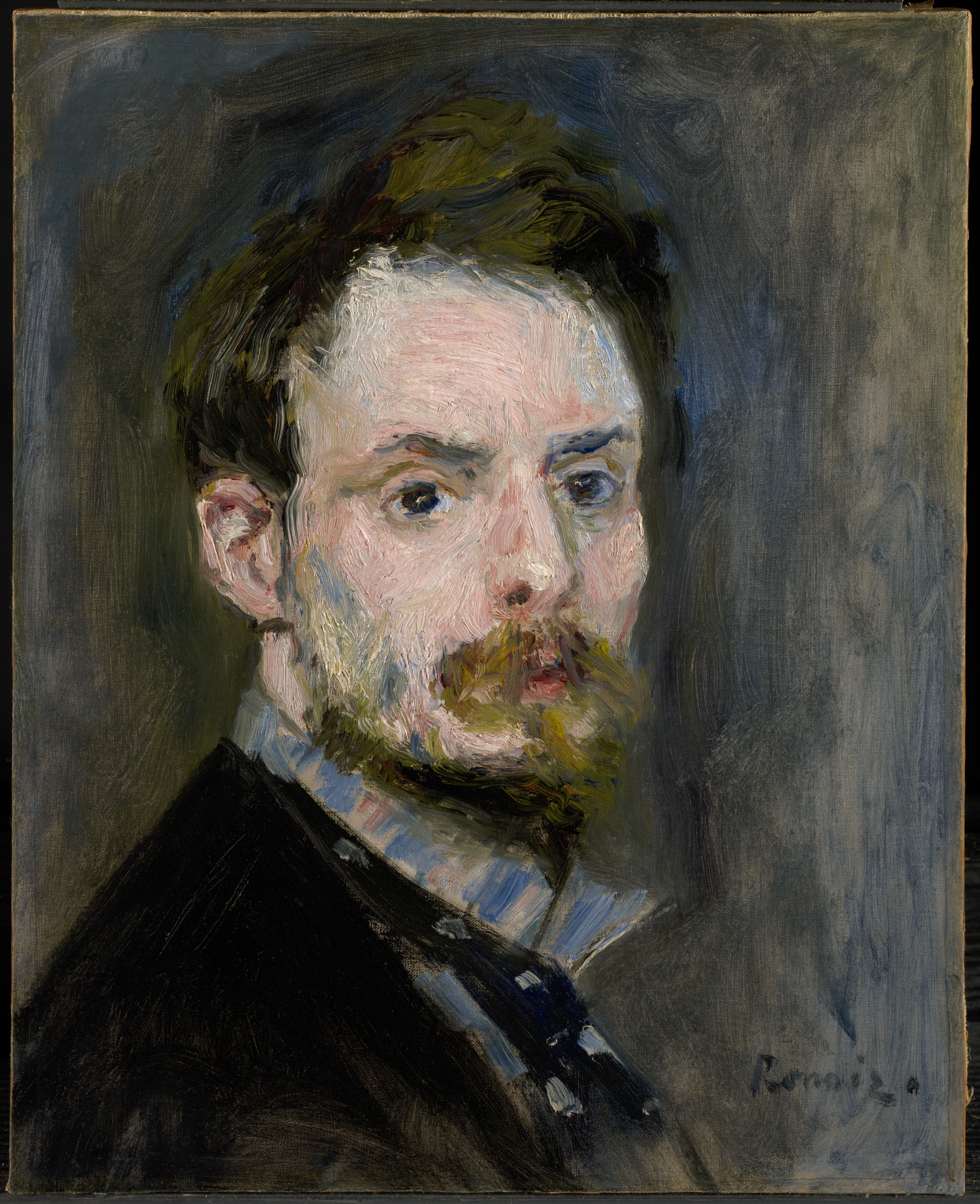
Self-portrait, 1875

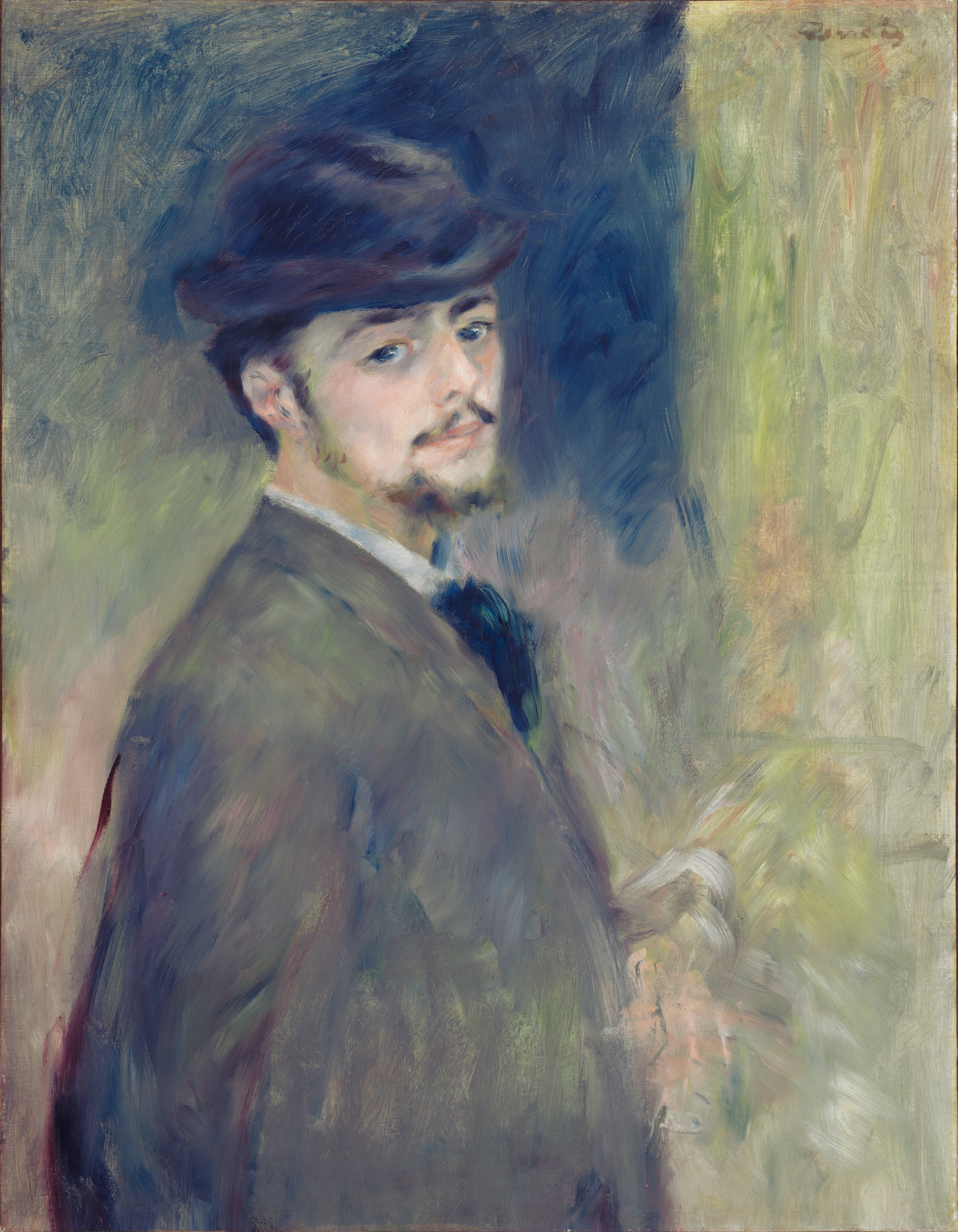
Self-portrait, 1876

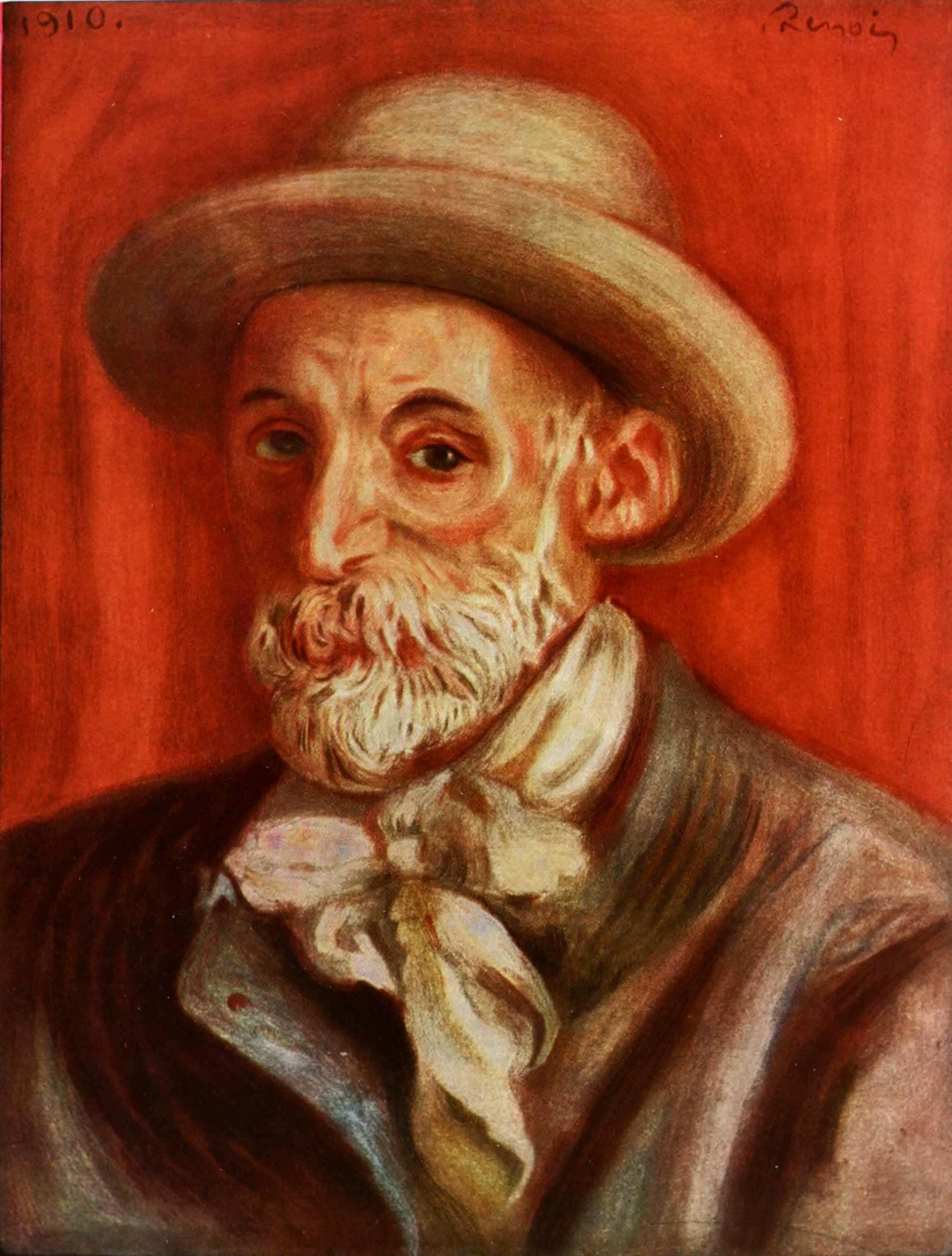
Self-portrait, 1910

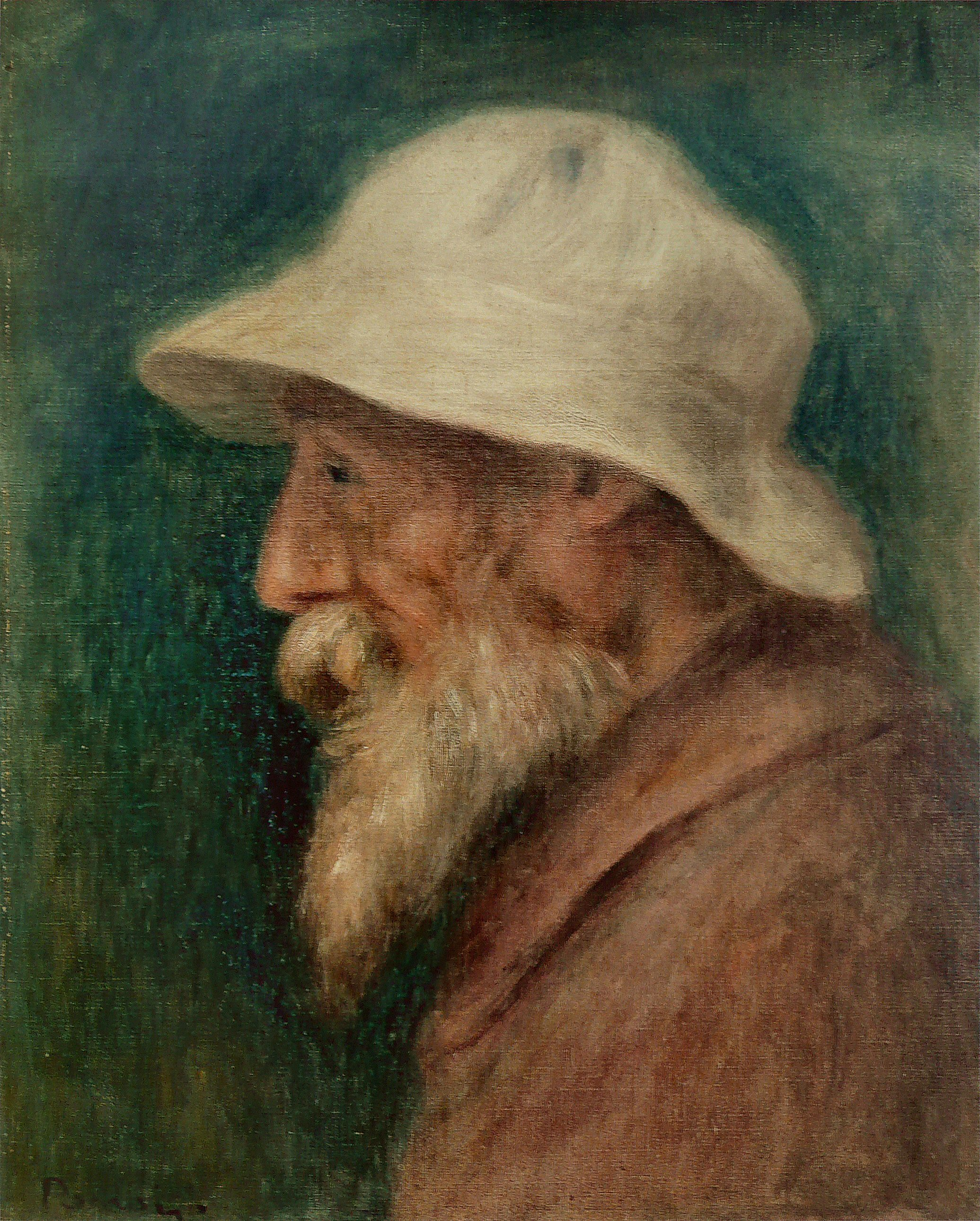
Self-portrait, 1910

=== Nudes ===
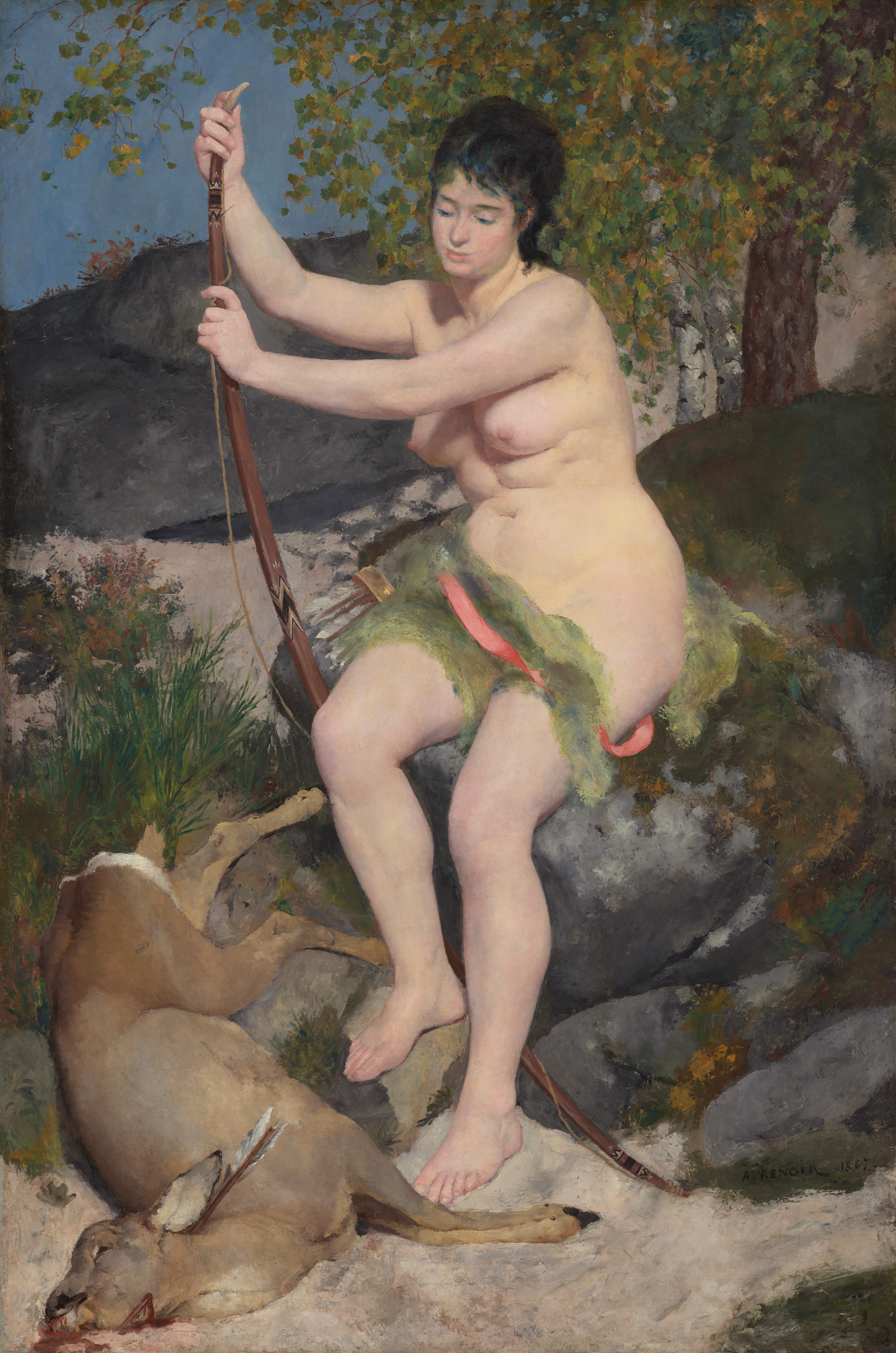
Diana, 1867, The National Gallery of Art, Washington, D.C.

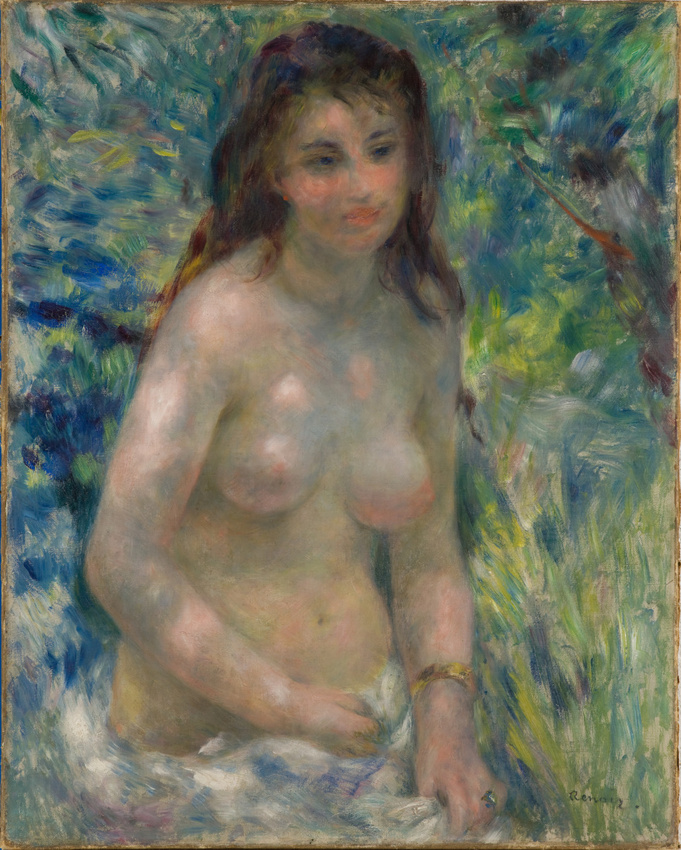
Nude in the Sun, 1875, Musée d'Orsay, Paris

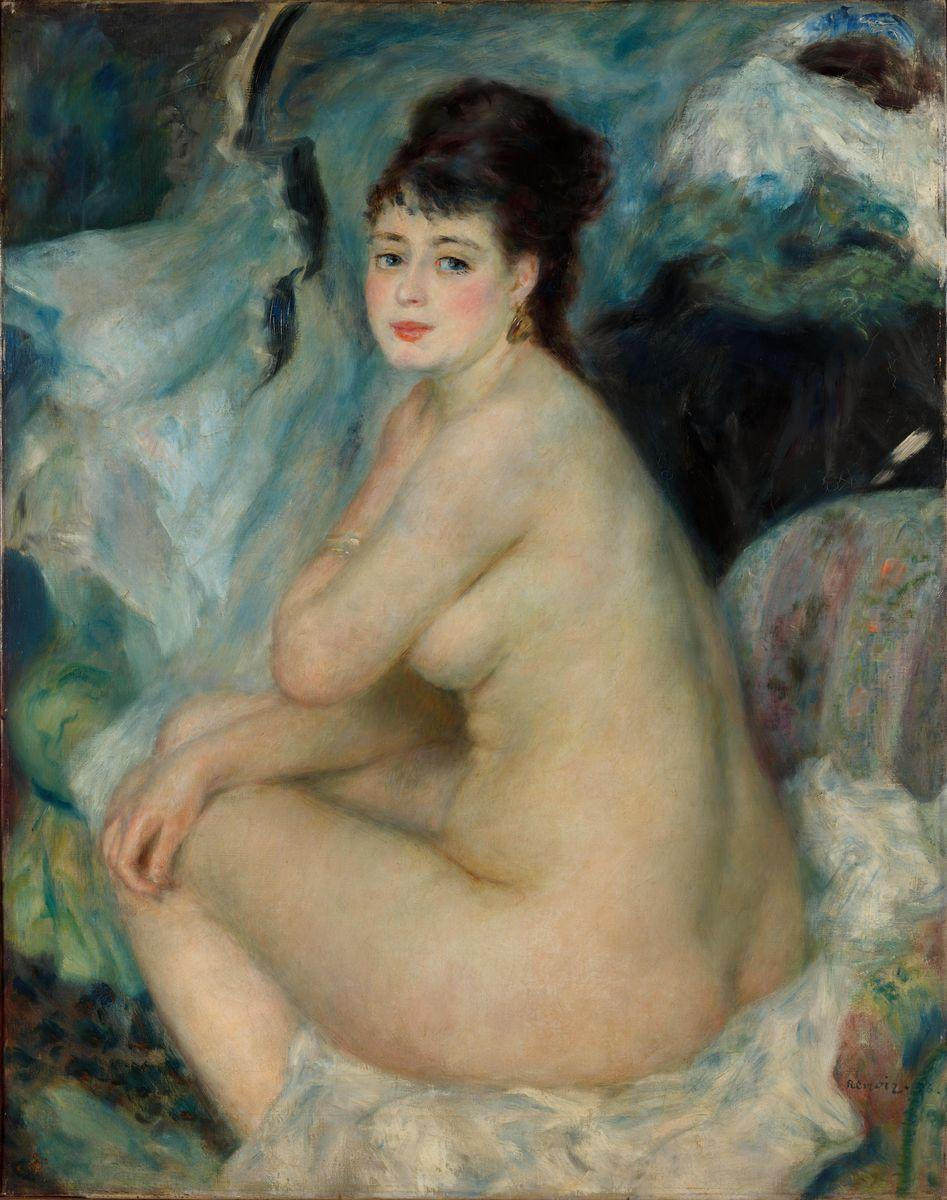
Female Nude, 1876, Pushkin Museum, Moscow

Seated Girl, 1883

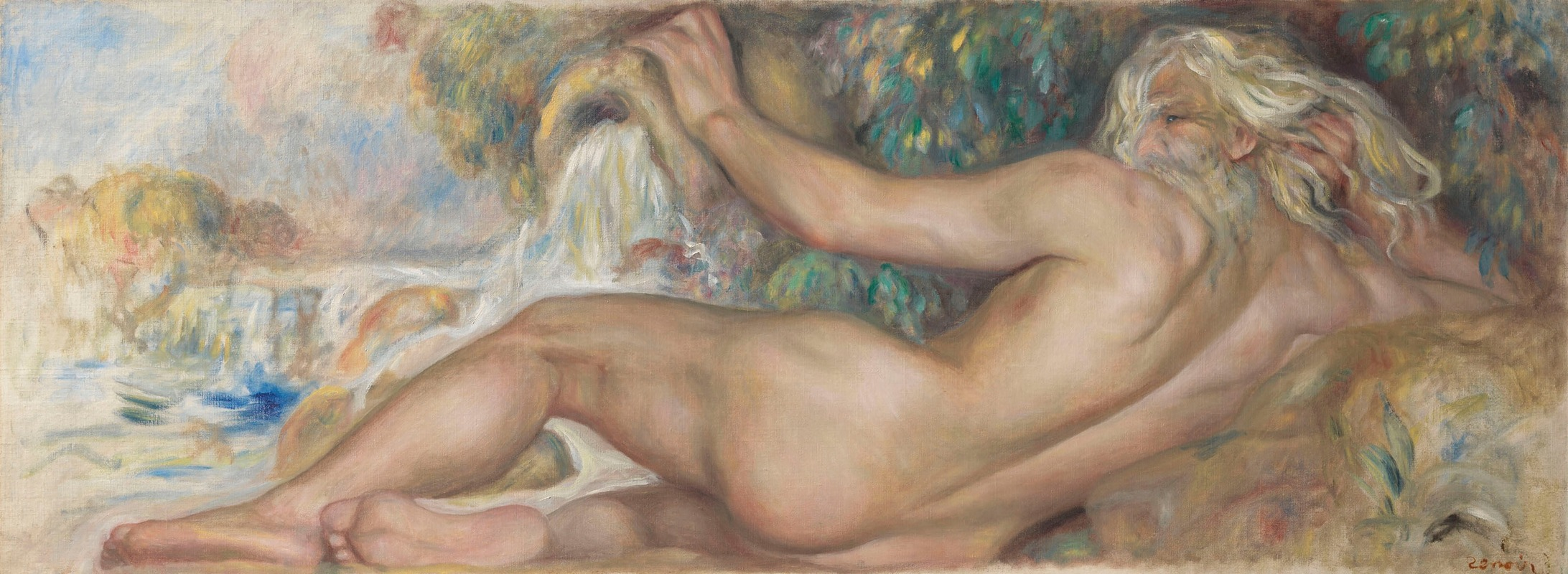
The river (Le Fleuve), 1885

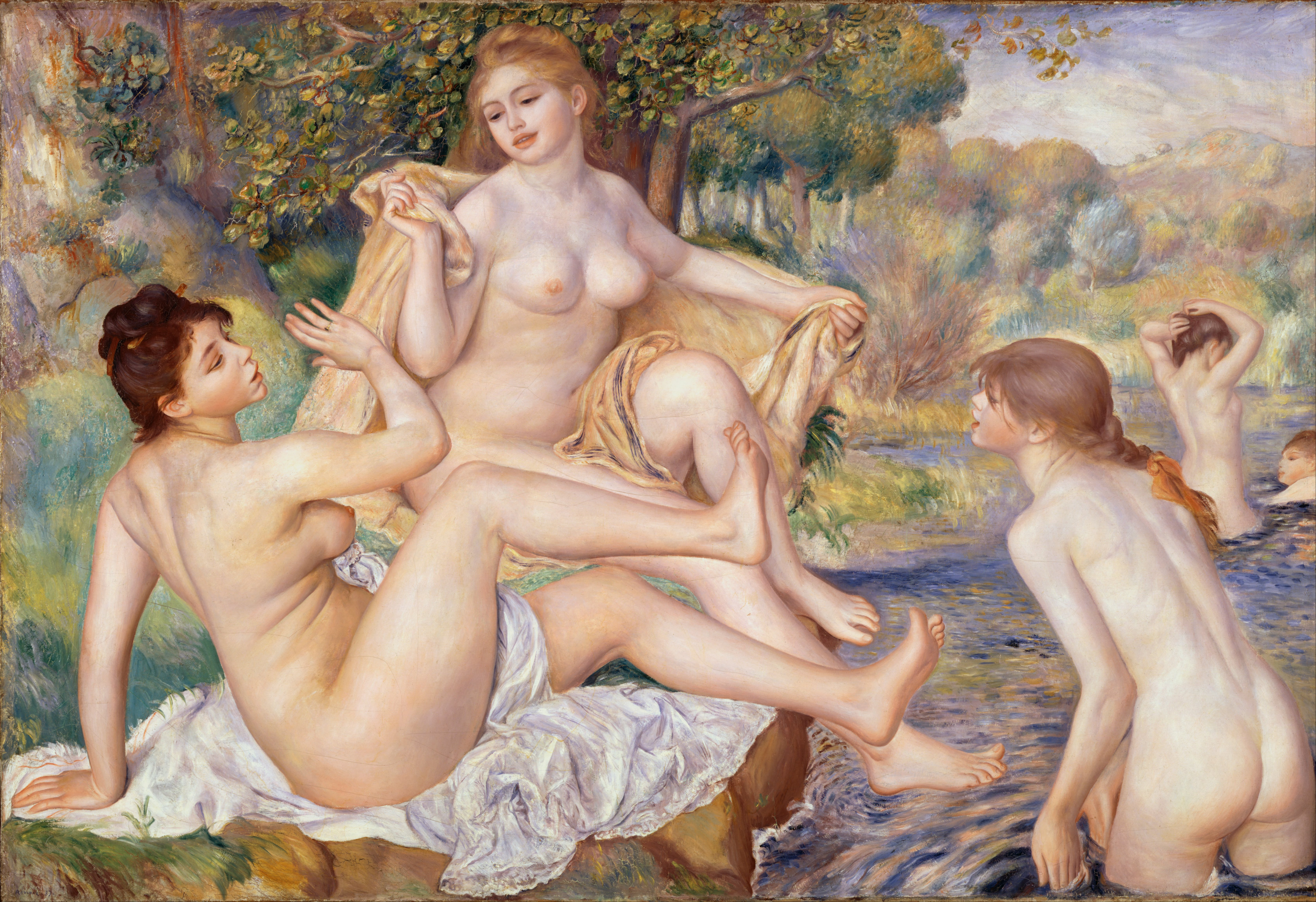
The Large Bathers, 1887, Philadelphia Museum of Art

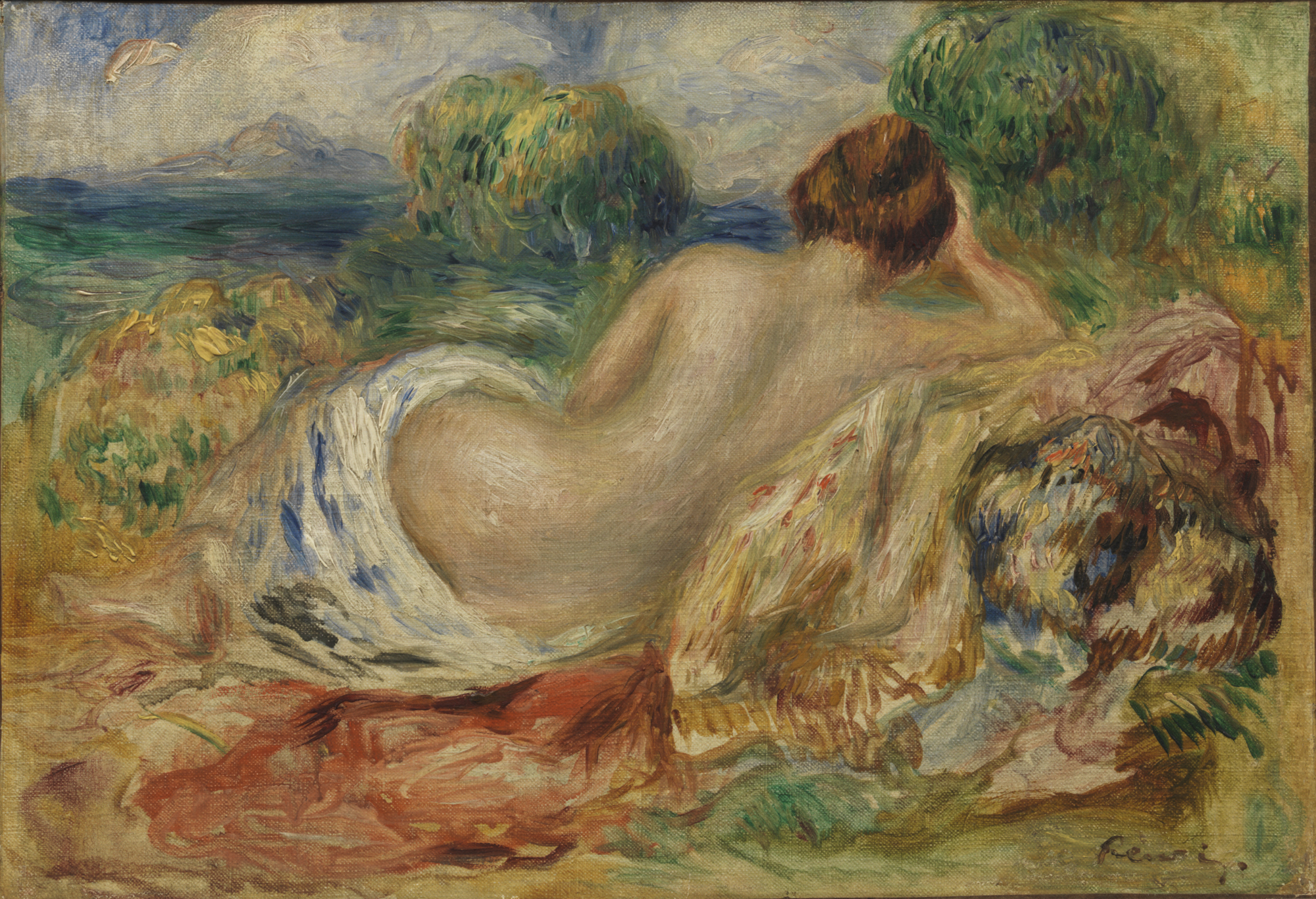
Nude in a Landscape, 1887, Princeton University Art Museum

Three Bathers, 1895, Cleveland Museum of Art Cleveland, Ohio

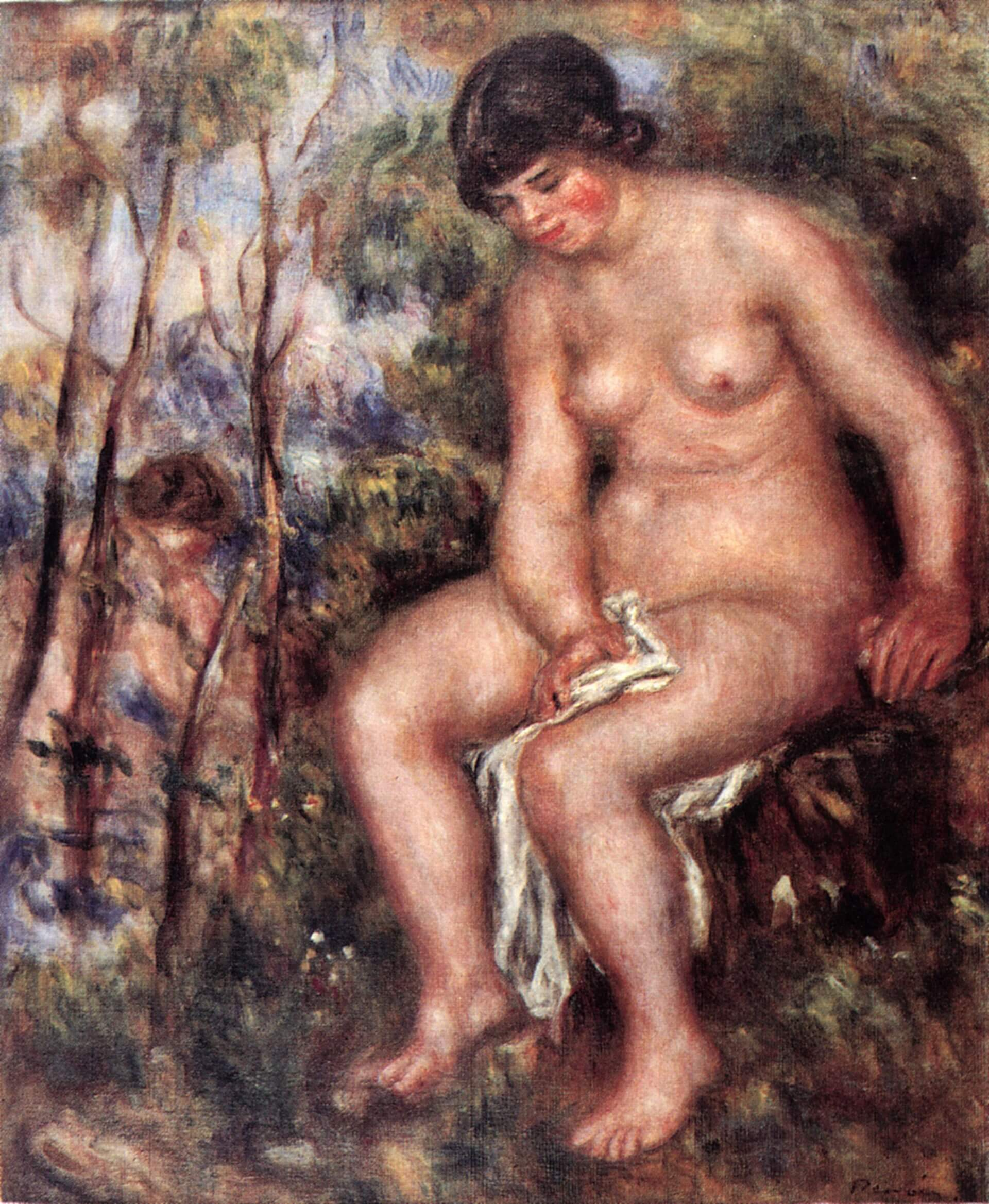
Nude, National Museum of Serbia, Belgrade

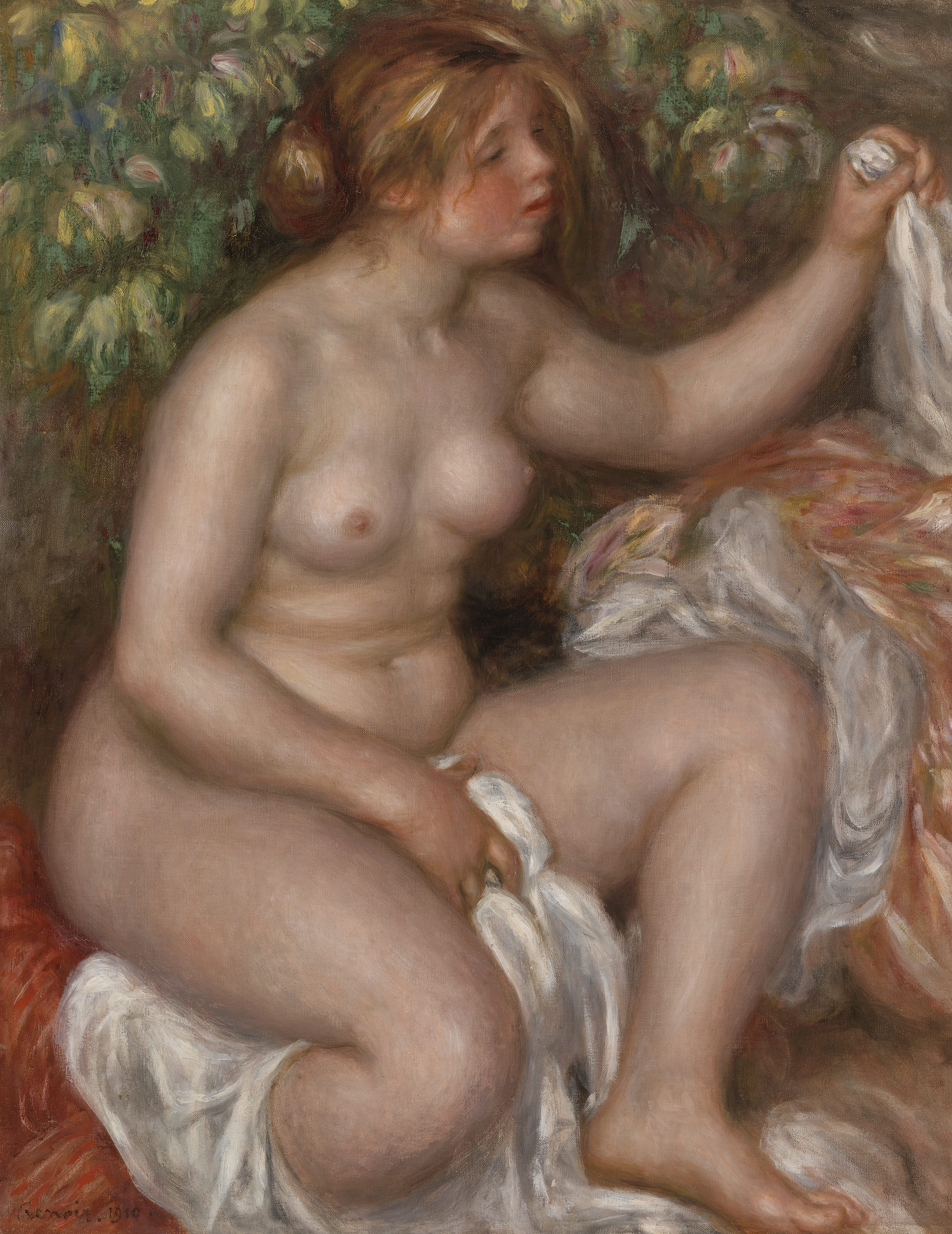
After the Bath, 1910, Barnes Foundation, Philadelphia

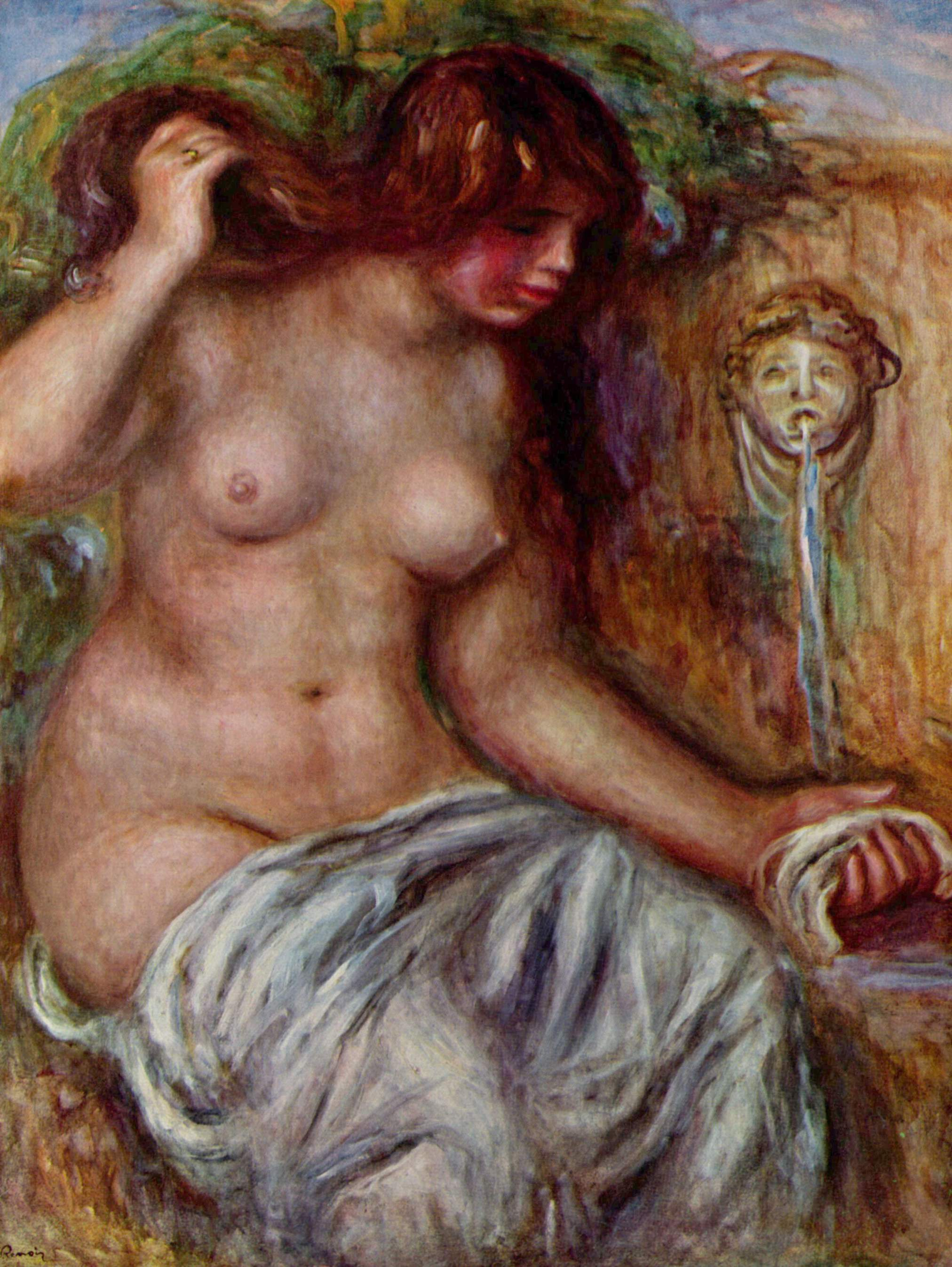
Woman at the Well, 1910

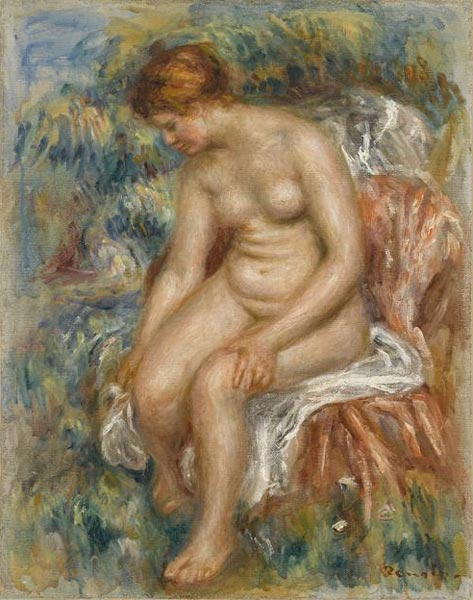
Seated Bather Drying Her Leg, 1914, Musée de l'Orangerie, Paris

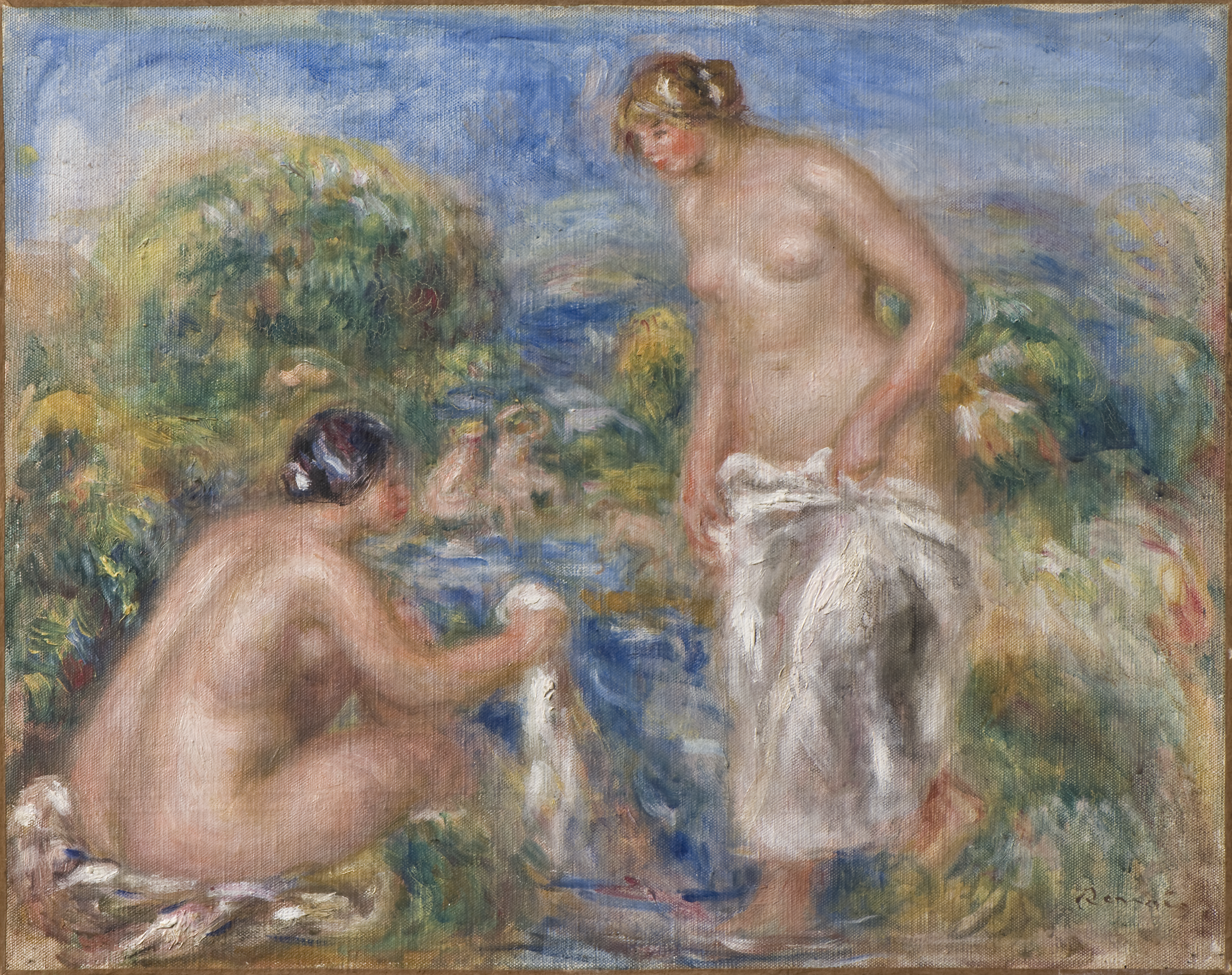
Women Bathers, 1916, Nationalmuseum, Stockholm

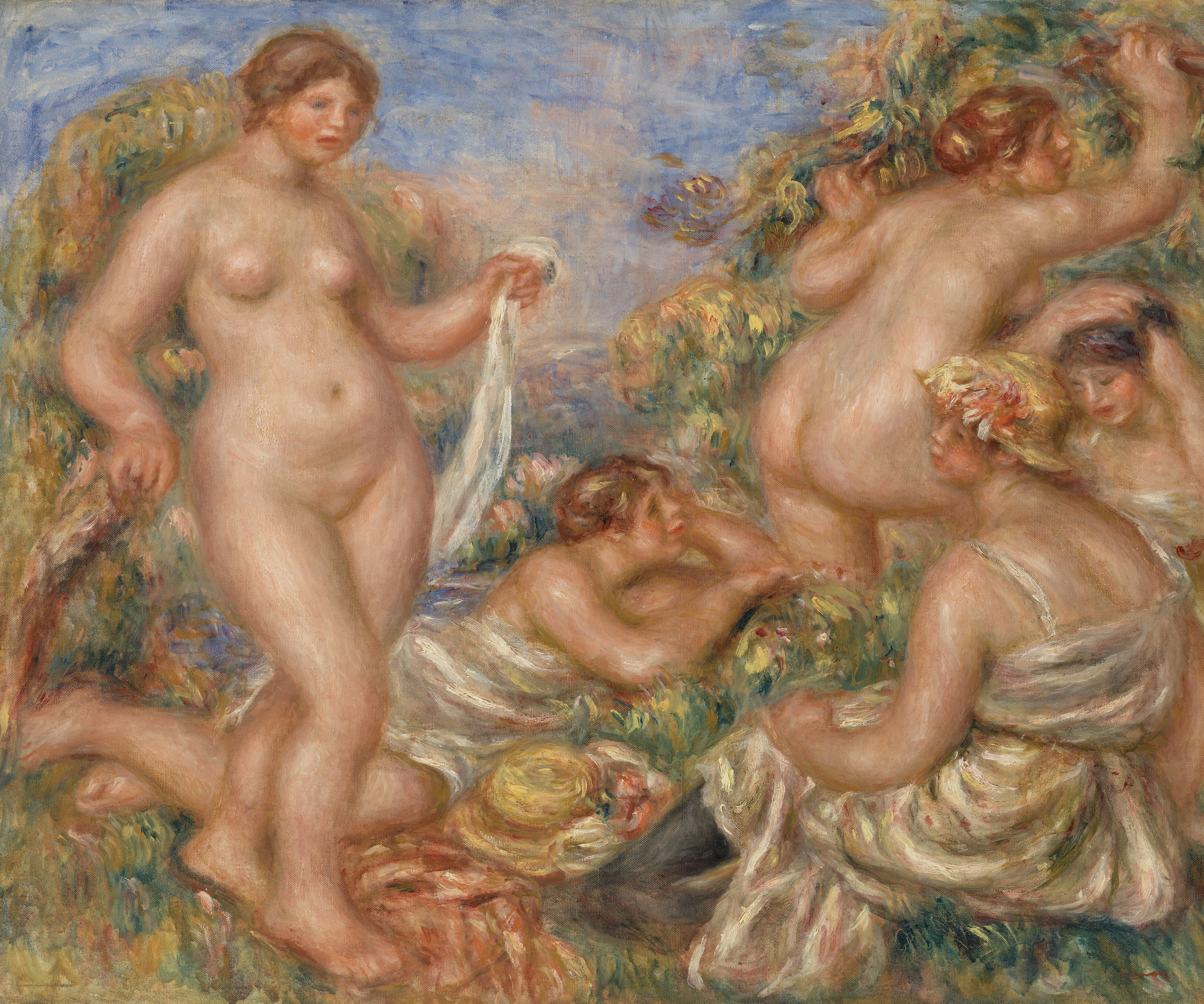
Bathers, 1918, Barnes Foundation, Philadelphia

=== Interactive image ===
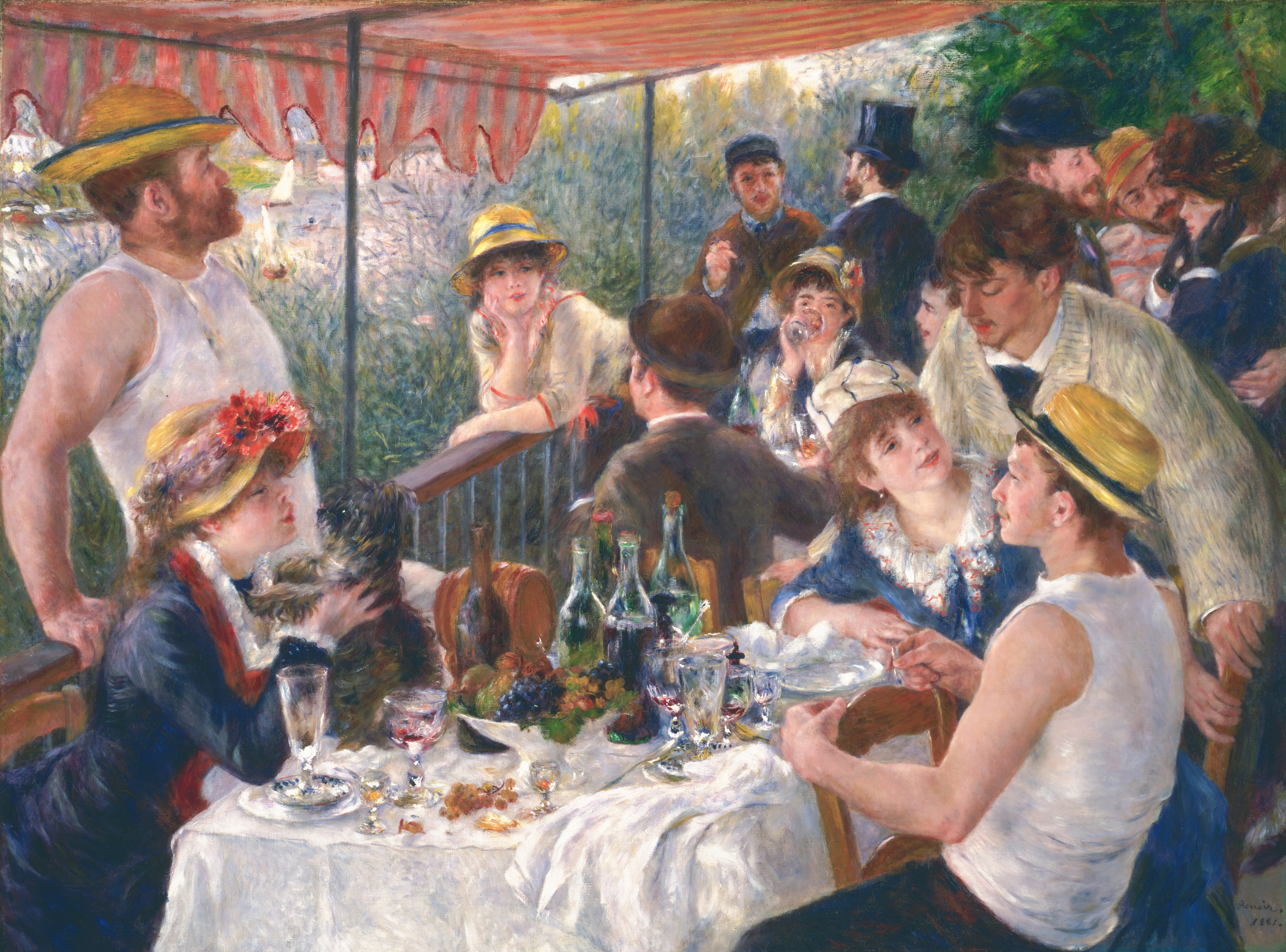
Clickable image of the Luncheon of the Boating Party (1881) by Pierre-Auguste Renoir (The Phillips Collection, Washington, D.C.). Place your mouse cursor over a person in the painting to see their name; click to link to an article about them. (view • discuss)

==== Close-ups ====
Luncheon of the Boating Party (1881) - Details of the Women

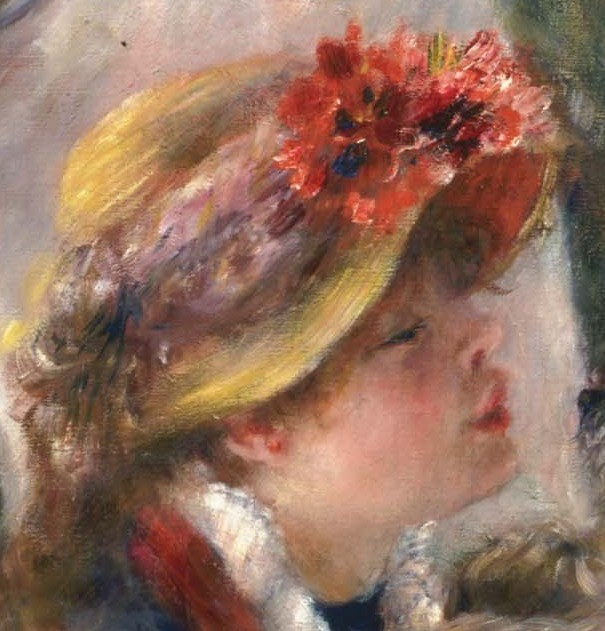
Aline Charigot

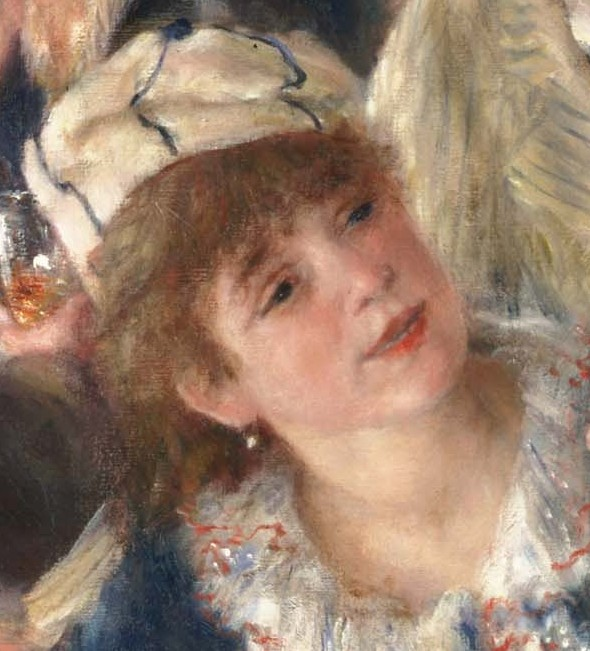
Angèle Legault

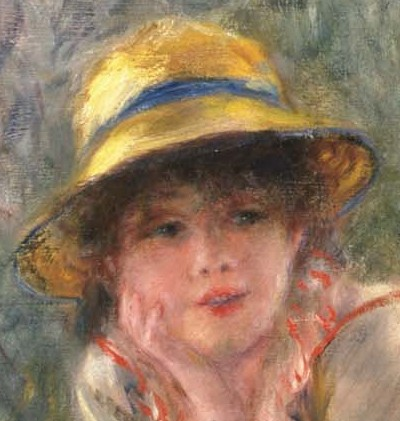
Louise-Alphonsine Fournaise

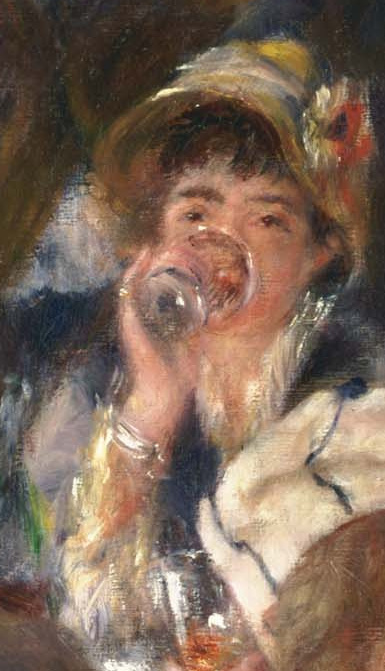
Ellen Andrée

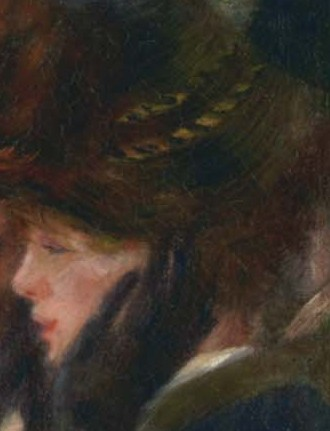
Jeanne Samary

Luncheon of the Boating Party (1881) - Details of the Men

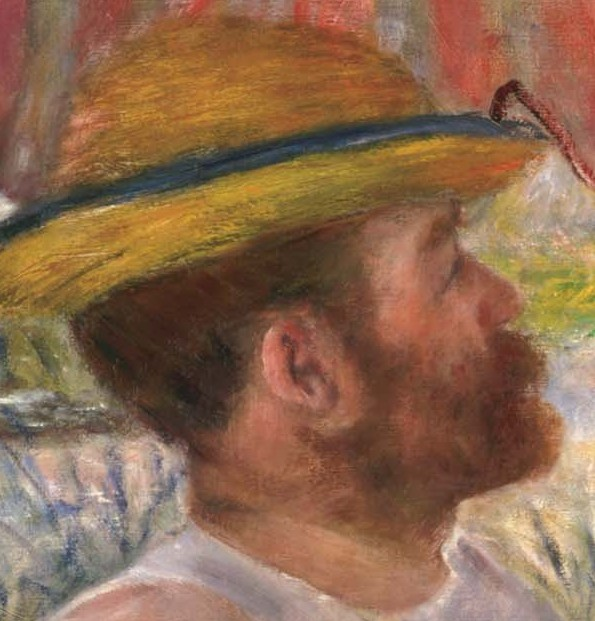
Alphonse Fournaise Jr.

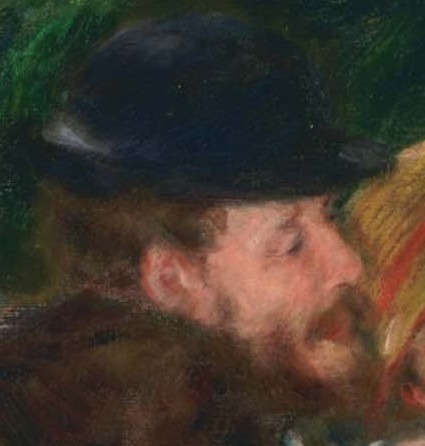
Pierre Lestringuèz

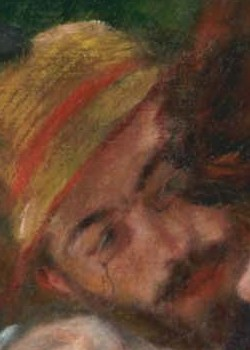
Paul Lhôte

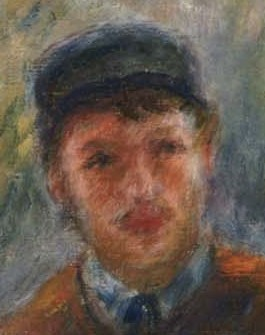
Jules Laforgue

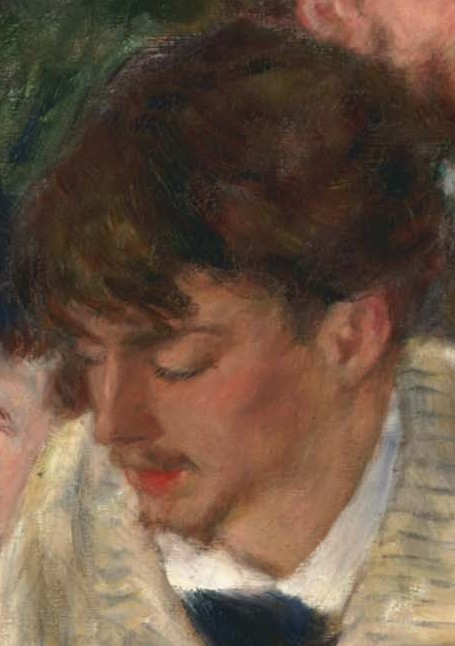
Antonio Maggiolo

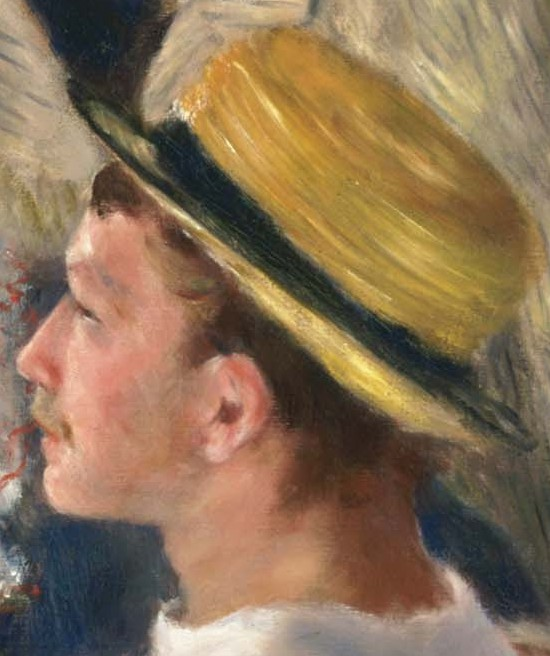
Gustave Caillebotte

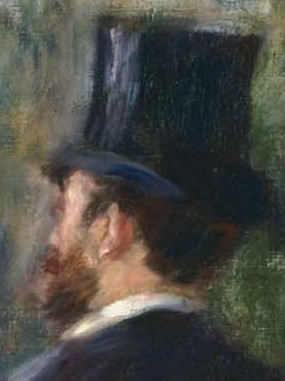
Charles Ephrussi

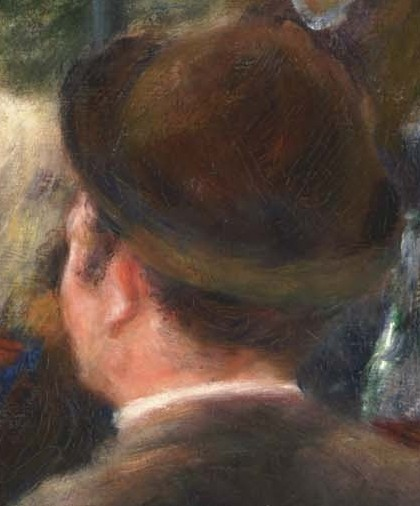
Raoul Barbier

== See also ==
- List of paintings by Pierre-Auguste Renoir
