= List of paintings by Pierre-Auguste Renoir =

This is an incomplete list of paintings by Impressionist painter Pierre-Auguste Renoir. Renoir painted about 4000 paintings that have sold at auction for as much as $78.1 million (in 1990). The largest collection of Renoir paintings is at the Barnes Foundation in Philadelphia, Pennsylvania, United States.

== 1860–1869 ==
Picture	Title	Year	Dimensions	Museum
	Portrait of Renoir's Mother	1860	45 cm × 36 cm (18 in × 14 in)	Private collection
	Mademoiselle Romaine Lacaux	1864	81.3 cm × 65 cm (32.0 in × 25.6 in)	Cleveland Museum of Art, Cleveland, Ohio, U.S.
	Portrait of Alfred Sisley	1864	81 cm × 65 cm (32 in × 26 in)	Foundation E.G. Bührle, Zürich
	Girl praying	1864	81 cm × 65 cm (32 in × 26 in)	Mimara Museum, Zagreb
	Portrait of William Sisley (fr:Portrait de William Sisley)	1864	81.5 cm × 65.5 cm (32.1 in × 25.8 in)	Musée d'Orsay, Paris, France
	Clearing in the Woods	1865	57.2 cm × 82.6 cm (22.5 in × 32.5 in)	Detroit Institute of Arts, Detroit
	Dans la forêt de Fontainebleau	1866	81 cm × 65 cm (32 in × 26 in)	Unknown. Formerly collection Briere de L'Isle; Galerie Dubourg, Paris.
	Jules Le Coeur and his dogs in the forest of Fontainebleau	1866	112 cm × 90 cm (44 in × 35 in)	São Paulo Museum of Art, of São Paulo, Brazil
	Spring Bouquet	1866	105 cm × 80 cm (41 in × 31 in)	Fogg Museum, Cambridge, Massachusetts
	Lise Sewing	1866	56.52 cm × 46.36 cm (22.25 in × 18.25 in)	Dallas Museum of Art, Texas
	Mother Anthony's Tavern	1866	194 cm × 131 cm (76 in × 52 in)	Nationalmuseum, Stockholm
	Madame Joseph Le Coeur	1866	116 cm × 89.5 cm (45.7 in × 35.2 in)	Musée d'Orsay, Paris
	Portrait of Clémence Tréhot, known as Madame Jules Le Cœur	1866	61 cm × 46 cm (24 in × 18 in)	Kunstmuseum Basel, Switzerland
	Diana	1866	197 cm × 132 cm (78 in × 52 in)	National Gallery of Art, Washington, DC
	The Pont des Arts, Paris	1867	60.9 cm × 23.9 cm (24.0 in × 9.4 in)	Norton Simon Museum, Pasadena, CA
	Frédéric Bazille at his Easel	1867	105 cm × 73.5 cm (41.3 in × 28.9 in)	Musée Fabre, Montpellier, France
	Lise with a Parasol	1867	184 cm × 115 cm (72 in × 45 in)	Museum Folkwang, Essen, Germany
	Skaters in the Bois de Boulogne	1868	72 cm × 90 cm (28 in × 35 in)	Private collection
	En été (La Bohémienne) (In Summer (The Bohemian))	1868	83 cm × 59 cm (33 in × 23 in)	Alte Nationalgalerie, Berlin, Germany
	A Couple (Les Fiancés) (fr:Les Fiancés - Le Ménage Sisley)	1868	105 cm × 75 cm (41 in × 30 in)	Wallraf–Richartz Museum, Cologne, Germany
	Léonard Renoir, The Artist's Father	1869	62.2 cm × 47 cm (24.5 in × 18.5 in)	Saint Louis Art Museum, St. Louis, Missouri
	Chalands sur la Seine (Barges on the Seine)	1869	47 cm × 64 cm (19 in × 25 in)	Musée d'Orsay, Paris
	La Grenouillère	1869	66 cm × 81 cm (26 in × 32 in)	Nationalmuseum, Stockholm, Sweden
	La Grenouillère	1869	65.1 cm × 92 cm (25.6 in × 36.2 in)	Oskar Reinhart Collection, Winterthur, Switzerland
	Woman Bathing	1869	62.2 cm × 47 cm (24.5 in × 18.5 in)	Mimara Museum, Zagreb
	A Nymph by a Stream	1869-70	66.5 cm × 124 cm (26.2 in × 48.8 in)	National Gallery, London

== 1870–1879 ==
Picture	Title	Year	Dimensions	Museum
	La Promenade	1870	81.3 cm × 64.8 cm (32.0 in × 25.5 in)	Getty Center, Los Angeles, California, U.S.
	Odalisque	1870	69.2 cm × 122.6 cm (27.2 in × 48.3 in)	National Gallery of Art, Washington, DC
	Madame Clémentine Valensi Stora	1870	84 cm × 58 cm (33 in × 23 in)	Fine Arts Museums of San Francisco, San Francisco, California
	Portrait of Marie Le Coeur	1870	41 cm × 33 cm (16 in × 13 in)	Strasbourg Museum of Modern and Contemporary Art, Strasbourg, France
	Bather with a Griffon Dog (French: Baigneuse avec un Griffon)	1870	184 cm × 115 cm (72 in × 45 in)	São Paulo Museum of Art, São Paulo, Brazil
	Woman with Parakeet (French: La femme à la perruche)	1871	92.1 cm × 65.1 cm (36.3 in × 25.6 in)	Solomon R. Guggenheim Museum, New York
	Charles Le Coeur	c. 1872	42 cm × 29 cm (17 in × 11 in)	Musée d'Orsay, Paris
	Parisian Women in Algerian Costume (The Harem) (French: Parisiennes en costume algérien (Le Harem))	1872	156 cm × 128.8 cm (61.4 in × 50.7 in)	National Museum of Western Art, Tokyo
	Le Pont-Neuf (fr:Le Pont-Neuf)	1872	74 cm × 93 cm (29 in × 37 in)	National Gallery of Art, Washington, D.C.
	Madame Monet Lying on a Sofa (fr:Madame Monet étendue sur un sofa)	1872-74	54 cm × 72 cm (21 in × 28 in)	Calouste Gulbenkian Museum, Lisbon, Portugal
	Claude Monet Painting in His Garden at Argenteuil (French: Monet Peignant dans son Jardin à Argenteuil)	1873	46 cm × 60 cm (18 in × 24 in)	Wadsworth Atheneum, Hartford, Connecticut
	Tapestry in the Park (French: La tapisserie dans le parc)	1873	46 cm × 38 cm (18 in × 15 in)	Private collection
	Spring, Chatou	1873	73 cm × 92 cm (29 in × 36 in)	Courtauld Gallery, London, UK
	Fisherman (French: Le Pêcheur à la ligne)	1874	54 cm × 64 cm (21 in × 25 in)	Private collection
	Madame Monet and her son	1874	50.4 cm × 68 cm (19.8 in × 26.8 in)	National Gallery of Art, Washington, DC
	La Loge (The Theatre Box)	1874	80 cm × 63.5 cm (31.5 in × 25.0 in)	Courtauld Gallery, London, UK
	The Dancer (French: La Danseuse)	1874	142.5 cm × 94.5 cm (56.1 in × 37.2 in)	National Gallery of Art, Washington, D.C.
	La Parisienne	1874	163.5 cm × 108.5 cm (64.4 in × 42.7 in)	National Museum Cardiff, Cardiff, Wales
	Woman with a Parasol in a Garden	1875	55 cm × 65 cm (22 in × 26 in)	Thyssen-Bornemisza Museum, Madrid
	The Grand Boulevards	1875	52.1 cm × 63.5 cm (20.5 in × 25.0 in)	Philadelphia Museum of Art, Philadelphia, Pennsylvania, U.S.
	Pére Fournaise	1875	59 cm × 47 cm (23 in × 19 in)	Clark Art Institute, Williamstown, Massachusetts, U.S.
	Torso: Effect of Sunlight	1875-1876	81 cm × 65 cm (32 in × 26 in)	Musée d'Orsay, Paris
	Portrait of Victor Chocquet (French: Portrait de Victor Chocquet)	1876	46 cm × 36 cm (18 in × 14 in)	Am Römerholz, Winterthur, Switzerland
	A Girl with a Watering Can (French: Une fille avec un arrosoir)	1876	100 cm × 73 cm (39 in × 29 in)	National Gallery of Art, Washington D.C.
	In the Garden – Under the Arbour at the Moulin de la Galette (French: Au jardin – Sous la tonnelle au moulin de la Galette	1876	81 cm × 65 cm (32 in × 26 in)	Pushkin Museum, Moscow
	The Swing (French: La balançoire)	1876	92 cm × 73 cm (36 in × 29 in)	Musée d'Orsay, Paris
	Self-Portrait	1876	73.3 cm × 57.3 cm (28.9 in × 22.6 in)	Fogg Art Museum, Cambridge, Massachusetts
	Bal du Moulin de la Galette (Dance at Le Moulin de la Galette)	1876	131 cm × 175 cm (52 in × 69 in)	Musée d'Orsay, Paris
	Nude woman sitting on a couch (Anna)	1876	92 cm × 73 cm (36 in × 29 in)	Pushkin Museum, Moscow
	Mother and Children (French: La Promenade)	1876	170.2 cm × 108.3 cm (67.0 in × 42.6 in)	Frick Collection, New York City
	Woman in Black (French: Portrait de femme en noir)	1876	65.5 cm × 55.5 cm (25.8 in × 21.9 in)	Hermitage Museum, Saint Petersburg, Russia
	Jeanne Durand-Ruel	1876	113 cm × 754 cm (44 in × 297 in)	Barnes Foundation, Philadelphia, Pennsylvania, U.S.
	Woman on a Stair	1876		Hermitage Museum, Saint Petersburg, Russia
	At the Theatre (fr:La première sortie)	1876–1877	65 cm × 49.5 cm (25.6 in × 19.5 in)	National Gallery, London, England
	Portrait of Madame Charpentier (French: Portrait de Madame Charpentier)	1876–1877	46.5 cm × 38 cm (18.3 in × 15.0 in)	Musée d'Orsay, Paris, France
	Spring Landscape (French: Paysage de printemps)	1877	38 cm × 53 cm (15 in × 21 in)	National Museum of Fine Arts of Algiers
	Eugène Murer	1877	47 cm × 39.4 cm (18.5 in × 15.5 in)	Metropolitan Museum of Art, New York City, New York
	The Daydream (fr:La Rêverie (Renoir))	1877	52 cm × 46 cm (20 in × 18 in)	Pushkin Museum, Moscow, Russia
	The Cup of Chocolate	1877-78	100 cm × 39 cm (39 in × 15 in)	Louvre Abu Dhabi, Abu Dhabi, United Arab Emirates.
	Flowers in a Vase (French: Fleurs dans un Vase)	1878		Deji Art Museum, Nanjing, China
	Portrait of Jeanne Samary (French: Portrait de l'Actrice Jeanne Samary)	1878	174 cm × 105 cm (69 in × 41 in)	Hermitage Museum, Saint Petersburg, Russia
	Madame Georges Charpentier and Her Children (fr:Madame Charpentier et ses enfants)	1878	153 cm × 190 cm (60 in × 75 in)	Metropolitan Museum of Art, New York City, New York
	Seascape	1879	72.6 cm × 91.6 cm (28.6 in × 36.1 in)	Art Institute of Chicago
	Paysage bords de Seine (On the Shore of the Seine)	1879	14 cm × 23 cm (5.5 in × 9 in)	Baltimore Museum of Art, Baltimore, Maryland
	Oarsmen at Chatou (French: Les canotiers à Chatou)	1879	81.2 cm × 100.2 cm (32.0 in × 39.4 in)	National Gallery of Art, Washington, D.C
	Lunch at the Restaurant Fournaise (French: Déjeuner au Restaurant Fournaise)	c. 1879	55.1 cm × 65.9 cm (21.7 in × 25.9 in)	Art Institute of Chicago, Chicago, Illinois

== 1880–1889 ==
Picture	Title	Year	Dimensions	Museum
	Two Sisters (On the Terrace) (French: Les deux sœurs (Sur la terrasse))	1881	100.5 cm × 81 cm (39.6 in × 31.9 in)	Art Institute of Chicago, Chicago, Illinois
	Mlle Irène Cahen d'Anvers	1880	65 cm × 54 cm (26 in × 21 in)	Foundation E.G. Bührle, Zurich, Switzerland
	Sleeping Girl (French: Fille endormie)	1880	120 cm × 94 cm (47 in × 37 in)	Clark Art Institute, Williamstown, Massachusetts
	Near the Lake (French: Près du lac)	1880	47.5 cm × 56.4 cm (18.7 in × 22.2 in)	Art Institute of Chicago, Chicago, Illinois
	Venice, the Doge's Palace (French: Venise, le Palais des Doges)	1881	54.5 cm × 65 cm (21.5 in × 25.6 in)	Clark Art Institute, Williamstown, Massachusetts
	Luncheon of the Boating Party (French: Le déjeuner des canotiers)	1881	129.9 cm × 172.7 cm (51.1 in × 68.0 in)	The Phillips Collection, Washington, D.C.
	Blonde Bather (1881) (French: La baigneuse blonde)	1881	82 cm × 66 cm (32 in × 26 in)	Private collection
	Young Girls in Black (French: Jeunes filles en noir)	1881	80 cm × 65 cm (31 in × 26 in)	Pushkin Museum, Moscow, Russia
	Pink and Blue (Alice and Elisabeth Cahen d’Anvers)	1881	119 cm × 74 cm (47 in × 29 in)	São Paulo Museum of Art, São Paulo, Brazil
	Fruits of the Midi (French: Fruits du midi)	1881	51 cm × 69 cm (20 in × 27 in)	Art Institute of Chicago, Chicago, Illinois, U.S.
	The Umbrellas (French: Les parapluies)	1881, 1885	180.3 cm × 114.9 cm (71.0 in × 45.2 in)	National Gallery, London, U.K.
	Algerian Woman	1881		Tel Aviv Museum of Art, Moshe and Sara Mayer Collection
	Rocky Crags at L'Estaque	1882	66.4 cm × 81 cm (26.1 in × 31.9 in)	Museum of Fine Arts, Boston
	Steps in Algiers (French: Étapes à Alger)	1882	73 cm × 60.5 cm (28.7 in × 23.8 in)	Private collection
	Blonde Bather (1882) (French: La baigneuse blonde)	1882	90 cm × 63 cm (35 in × 25 in)	Private collection
	Portrait of Charles and George Durand-Ruel (French: Portrait de Charles et George Durand-Ruel)	1882	65 cm × 81 cm (26 in × 32 in)	Private collection
	Still Life, Roses of Wargemont (French: Nature morte, Roses de Wargemont)	1882	65 cm × 81 cm (26 in × 32 in)	Private collection
	Agenteuil Bridge in Autumn (French: Le Pont d'Argenteuil en automne)	1882	54.3 cm × 65.8 cm (21.4 in × 25.9 in)	Private collection
	By the Seashore (French: Femme Assise au Bord de la Mer)	1883	92.1 cm × 72.4 cm (36.3 in × 28.5 in)	Metropolitan Museum of Art, New York
	Dance at Bougival (French: La Danse à Bougival)	1883	181.9 cm × 98.1 cm (71.6 in × 38.6 in)	Museum of Fine Arts, Boston, Massachusetts
	Fog at Guernsey (French: Brouillard à Guernesey)	1883	54 cm × 65 cm (21 in × 26 in)	Cincinnati Art Museum, Cincinnati, Ohio
	Dance in the City (French: Danse dans la Ville)	1883	180 cm × 90 cm (71 in × 35 in)	Musée d'Orsay, Paris, France
	Dance in the Country (French: Danse à la Campagne)	1883	180 cm × 90 cm (71 in × 35 in)	Musée d'Orsay, Paris, France
	Children on the Seashore, Guernsey (French: Enfants au Bord de la Mer, Guernesey)	1883	91.4 cm × 66.4 cm (36.0 in × 26.1 in)	Museum of Fine Arts, Boston, Massachusetts
	Landscape of Ile de France (French: Paysage d'Ile de France)	1883	54 cm × 65 cm (21 in × 26 in)	Botero Museum, Bogotá, Colombia
	Sunset in Douarnenez (French: Coucher de soleil à Douarnenez)	1883	53.7 cm × 64.4 cm (21.1 in × 25.4 in)	Private collection
	Naked Woman in a Landscape (French: Femme nue dans un paysage)	1883	65 cm × 54 cm (26 in × 21 in)	Private collection
	Children on the Beach of Guernsey (French: Enfants sur la Plage de Guernesey)	1883	54.2 cm × 65 cm (21.3 in × 25.6 in)	Barnes Foundation, Philadelphia, Pennsylvania, U.S.
	Children's Afternoon at Wargemont (French: L'après-midi des enfants à Wargemont)	1884	127 cm × 73 cm (50 in × 29 in)	Alte Nationalgalerie, Berlin
	Girl with a Hoop (French: Fille avec un cerceau)	1885	125.7 cm × 76.6 cm (49.5 in × 30.2 in)	National Gallery of Art, Washington D.C.
	Nature morte: fleurs (Still Life: Flowers)	1885	81.9 cm × 65.8 cm (32.2 in × 25.9 in)	Guggenheim Museum, New York
	In the Garden (French: Dans le jardin)	1885	170.5 cm × 112.5 cm (67.1 in × 44.3 in)	Hermitage Museum, Saint Petersburg, Russia
	Vase of Flowers, Roses (French: Vase de Fleurs, Roses)	1885-1890		Deji Art Museum, Nanjing, China
	Woman with Fan (French: Femme à l'éventail)	1886	56 cm × 46 cm (22 in × 18 in)	Barnes Foundation, Philadelphia, Pennsylvania, U.S.
	Garden Scene in Brittany (French: Scène de jardin en Bretagne)	1886	54 cm × 65.4 cm (21.3 in × 25.7 in)	Barnes Foundation, Philadelphia, Pennsylvania, U.S.
	Jeune Femme au puits	c. 1886	35 cm × 27 cm (14 in × 11 in)	Musée Renoir, Cagnes-sur-Mer (stolen 2026)
	Woman Arranging her Hair (fr:Femme se coiffant)	1887	65.3 cm × 54 cm (25.7 in × 21.3 in)	Hermitage Museum, Saint Petersburg, Russia
	Les grandes baigneuses (The Large Bathers)	1884–87	115 cm × 170 cm (45 in × 67 in)	Philadelphia Museum of Art, Philadelphia, Pennsylvania
	The Daughters of Catulle Mendès	1888	61.9 cm × 129.9 cm (24.4 in × 51.1 in)	Metropolitan Museum of Art, New York City, New York
	Young Woman with a Blue Ribbon (French: Jeune fille au ruban bleu)	1888	55 cm × 46 cm (22 in × 18 in)	Museum of Fine Arts of Lyon, France
	Girl with Spikes (French: Fille aux oreilles)	1888	65 cm × 54 cm (26 in × 21 in)	São Paulo Museum of Art, São Paulo, Brazil
	A Young Girl with Daisies (French: Une jeune fille avec des marguerites)	1889	65.1 cm × 54 cm (25.6 in × 21.3 in)	Metropolitan Museum of Art, New York City, New York
	The Two Sisters (French: Les deux soeurs)	1889	65.6 cm × 54.7 cm (25.8 in × 21.5 in)	Private collection

== 1890–1899 ==
Picture	Title	Year	Dimensions	Museum
	In the Meadow (French: Dans le pré)	1890	81 cm × 60 cm (32 in × 24 in)	Metropolitan Museum of Art, New York City
	Girls at the Piano (French: Jeunes filles au piano)	1892	116 cm × 90 cm (46 in × 35 in)	Musée d'Orsay, Paris, France
	Young Girls Looking at an Album (French: Jeunes Filles regardant un album)	c. 1892	81.3 cm × 64.8 cm (32.0 in × 25.5 in)	Virginia Museum of Fine Arts, Richmond, Virginia
	Girl Playing Croquet (French: Fille jouant au croquet)	1892		Fondation Valentim, São Paulo, Brazil
	Portrait of Victorine de Bellio (French: Portrait de Mademoiselle Victorine de Bellio)	1892	55 cm × 46 cm (22 in × 18 in)	Musée Marmottan Monet, Paris, France
	Bathers Playing with a Crab (French: Baigneurs jouant avec un crabe)	1895	75.5 cm × 85.5 cm (29.7 in × 33.7 in)	Cleveland Museum of Art, Cleveland, Ohio
	Gabrielle Renard and Her Infant Son, Jean (French: Gabrielle Renard et Jean enfant)	1895–1896	65 cm × 54 cm (26 in × 21 in)	Musée de l'Orangerie, Paris, France
	Study, Jeanne Baudot in a green hat (French: Etude, Jeanne Baudot en chapeau vert)	1896	23.3 cm × 18.8 cm (9.2 in × 7.4 in)	Unknown location
	Double portrait of Jeanne Baudot by Pierre-Auguste Renoir (French: Portrait de Jeanne Baudot de trois-quarts et de face)	1896		Unknown location
	Woman Playing a Guitar (French: Femme jouant de la guitare)	1897	81 cm × 65 cm (32 in × 26 in)	Museum of Fine Arts of Lyon, France
	Yvonne et Christine Lerolle au piano (Yvonne and Christine Lerolle at the Piano)	1897	73 cm × 92 cm (29 in × 36 in)	Musée de l'Orangerie, Paris, France

== 1900–1909 ==
Picture	Title	Year	Dimensions	Museum
	Reclining nude (Gabrielle); Femme nue couchée (Gabrielle)	1903	65.5 cm × 155.5 cm (25.8 in × 61.2 in)	Museum of Fine Arts, Budapest, Hungary
	Renoirs House at Essoyes	1906	33 cm × 41 cm (13 in × 16 in)	Private collection
	Nude woman lying down (Femme nue couchée)	1906	67 cm × 160 cm (26 in × 63 in)	Musée de l'Orangerie, Paris, France
	Promenade	1906	164.5 cm × 129.4 cm (64.8 in × 50.9 in)	Barnes Foundation, Philadelphia
	Gabrielle with Open Blouse (French: Gabrielle avec la chemise ouverte)	c. 1907	65 cm × 53 cm (26 in × 21 in)	Tehran Museum of Contemporary Art, Tehran, Iran
	La Toilette : femme se peignant (La Toilette: femme se peignant)	1907	55 cm × 46.5 cm (21.7 in × 18.3 in)	Musée d'Orsay, Paris, France
	Ambroise Vollard	1908	81.6 cm × 65.2 cm (32.1 in × 25.7 in)	Courtauld Gallery, London, England
	Still Life, Roses in Front of Blue Curtain (French: Nature morte, roses devant le rideau bleu)	1908	48 cm × 54.5 cm (18.9 in × 21.5 in)	Private collection
	Claude Renoir in Clown Costume (Claude Renoir en clown)	1909	120 cm × 77 cm (47 in × 30 in)	Musée de l'Orangerie, Paris, France

== 1910–1919 ==
Picture	Title	Year	Dimensions	Museum
	Nude (French: Nu)	1910	65.5 cm × 54 cm (25.8 in × 21.3 in)	National Museum of Serbia, Belgrade
	The Coast at Cagnes, Sea, Mountains	1910		Bristol Museum, England
	Self-Portrait	1910	18 cm × 15 cm (7.1 in × 5.9 in)	Private collection
	After the Bath (French: La sortie du bain)	1910	94.5 cm × 75.2 cm (37.2 in × 29.6 in)	Barnes Foundation, Philadelphia, Pennsylvania
	Portrait of Paul Durand-Ruel	1910	65 cm × 55 cm (26 in × 22 in)	Archives Durand-Ruel
	Self-portrait	1910	42 cm × 33 cm (17 in × 13 in)	Private collection
	Woman at the Fountain (French: Femme à la fontaine)	1910	91 cm × 74 cm (36 in × 29 in)	Galerie Paul Rosenberg
	Portrait of Ambroise Vollard in a Red Headscarf (French: Ambroise Vollard au foulard rouge)	1911	30 cm × 25 cm (11.8 in × 9.8 in)	Petit Palais, Paris, France
	Portrait of Madame Colonna Romano	c. 1913	94 cm × 74 cm (37 in × 29 in)	Musée Renoir, Cagnes-sur-Mer (stolen 2026)
	The Farm at Les Collettes, Cagnes	1908–1914	54.6 cm × 65.4 cm (21.5 in × 25.7 in)	Metropolitan Museum of Art, New York City
	Portrait of Véra Sergine	1914	49 cm × 59 cm (19 in × 23 in)	Botero Museum, Bogotá, Colombia
	Seated Bather Drying Her Leg (French: Baigneuse assise s'essuyant une jambe)	1914	51 cm × 41 cm (20 in × 16 in)	Musée de l'Orangerie, Paris, France
	Women Bathers (French: Femmes au bain)	1916	40.5 cm × 51 cm (15.9 in × 20.1 in)	Nationalmuseum, Stockholm, Sweden
	Blond Girl with a Rose (French: Blonde à la rose)	1915–1917	64 cm × 54 cm (25 in × 21 in)	Musée de l'Orangerie, Paris, France
	Portrait of Ambroise Vollard	1917	102 cm × 83 cm (40 in × 33 in)	Private collection
	Bathers (French: Les baigneuses)	1918	65 cm × 80 cm (26 in × 31 in)	Barnes Foundation, Philadelphia, Pennsylvania, U.S
	The Concert (French: Le concert)	1918	75.6 cm × 92.7 cm (29.8 in × 36.5 in)	Art Gallery of Ontario, Toronto, Ontario, Canada
	Portrait of Adèle Besson	1918	41 cm × 36.8 cm (16.1 in × 14.5 in)	Musée des Beaux-Arts et d'Archéologie de Besançon, France
	The Bathers (French: Les baigneuses)	1918-1919	24 cm × 43 cm (9.4 in × 16.9 in)	Musée d'Orsay, Paris, France
	Madeleine Leaning on Her Elbow with Flowers in Her Hair	1918	50.1 cm × 41.2 cm (19.7 in × 16.2 in)	stolen during an armed robbery on 8 September 2011 from a home in Houston, Texas
	Landscape	by 1919	10 cm × 30 cm (3.9 in × 11.8 in)	
