= Pour le piano =

Piano suite by Claude Debussy

- Piano suite by Claude Debussy
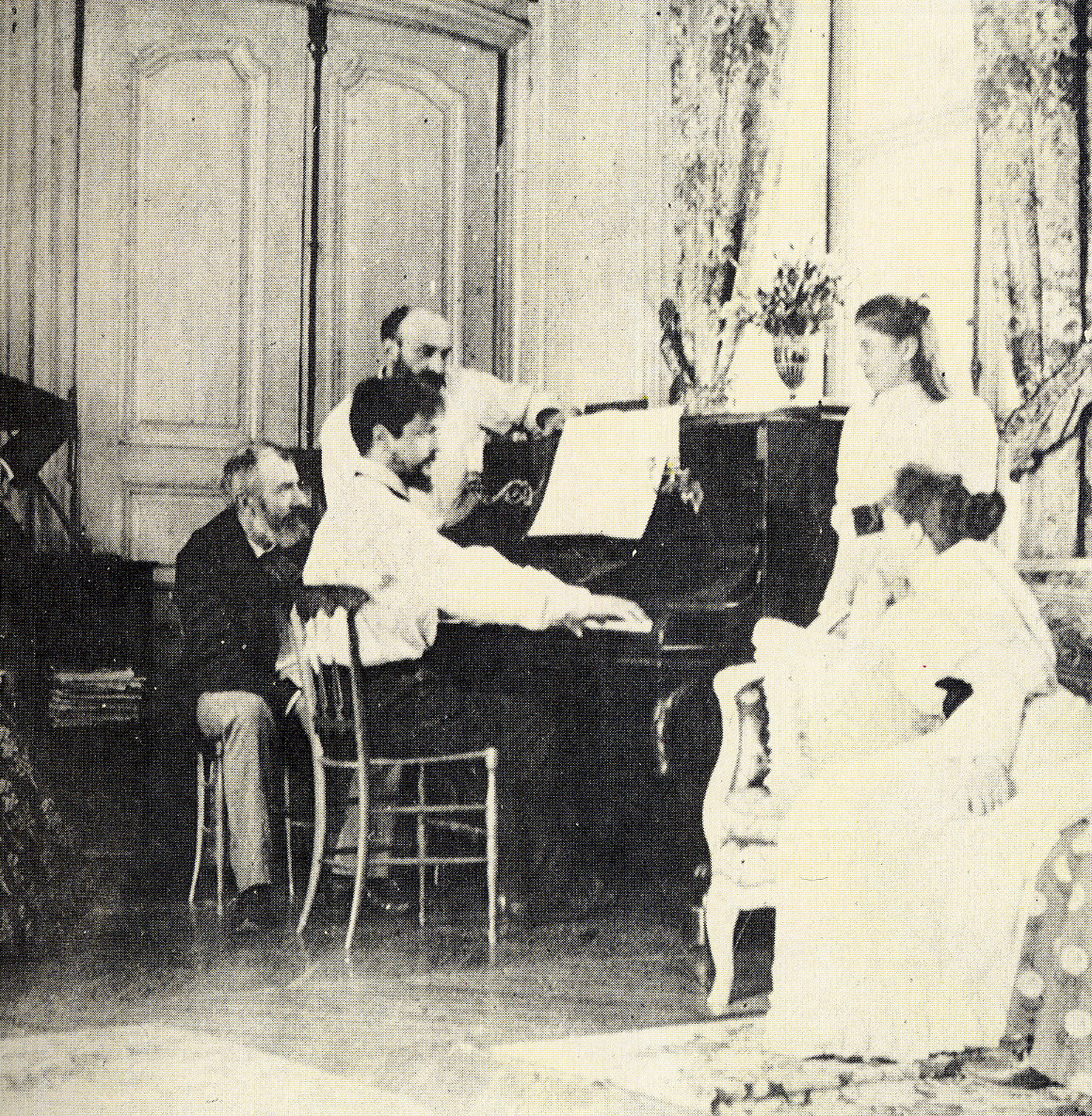
- Debussy at the piano in 1893
- English: For the piano
- Catalogue: L. 95
- Composed: 1894–1901
- Dedication: Mlle Worms de Romilly; Yvonne Lerolle
- Performed: 11 January 1902
- Published: 1901

Pour le piano (For the piano), L. 95, is a suite for solo piano by Claude Debussy. It consists of three individually composed movements, Prélude, Sarabande and Toccata. The suite was completed and published in 1901. It was premiered on 11 January 1902 at the Salle Érard, played by Ricardo Viñes. Maurice Ravel orchestrated the middle movement.

Regarded as Debussy's first mature piano composition, the suite has frequently been recorded. Bärenreiter published a critical edition in 2018, on the occasion of the centenary of Debussy's death.

== History ==
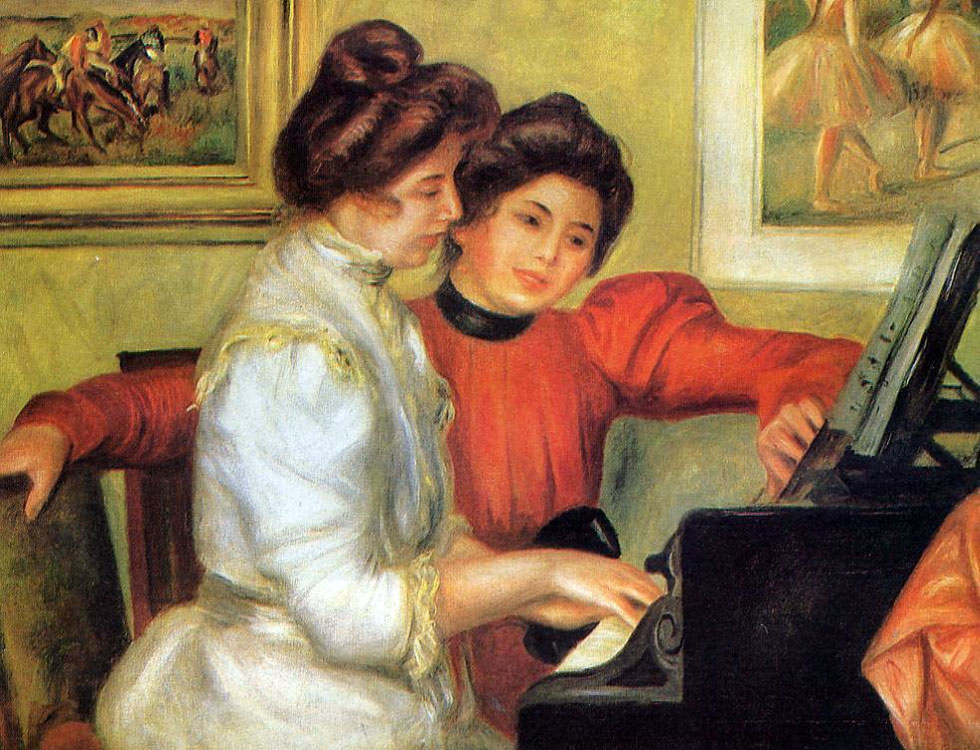
Pierre-Auguste Renoir: Yvonne et Christine Lerolle au piano, 1897–1898, Musée de l'Orangerie

Claude Debussy composed the three pieces forming the suite at different times. The second movement, a sarabande, dates to the winter of 1894 when it belonged to the series of Images oubliées, dedicated to Yvonne Lerolle, the daughter of Henry Lerolle. Debussy composed little piano music during the 1890s and focused on opera and orchestral music. He completed the suite in 1901, revising Sarabande. He also dedicated the revised version of Sarabande, as well as the third movement, Toccata, to Yvonne Lerolle, now Mme E. Rouart. The suite was published in 1901 by Eugène Fromont. It was premiered on 11 January 1902 at the Salle Érard in Paris for the Société Nationale de Musique. Ricardo Viñes was the pianist, who knew about the suite from his friend Maurice Ravel.

Pour le piano marked a turning point in Debussy's creative development, who now turned to a prolific production of piano music.

On the occasion of the centenary of Debussy's death, Bärenreiter published in 2018 a critical edition of some of his piano music, including Pour le piano. The publisher remarked that the "improvisational and fugitive" parts of Debussy's compositions were "governed by a precisely calibrated formal design" that left "little room for chance".

== Structure and music ==
II. Sarabande
performed March 2011

III. Toccata
performed November 2010

Pour le piano has been regarded as Debussy's first mature piano work. The suite consists of three movements:

1. Prélude
2. Sarabande
3. Toccata

The first movement, called Prélude, is marked "Assez animé et très rythmé" (With spirit and very rhythmically). It was dedicated to Debussy's student Mlle Worms de Romilly, who notes that the movement "tellingly evokes the gongs and music of Java". The pianist Angela Hewitt notes that Prélude begins with a theme in the bass, followed by a long pedal point passage. The theme is repeated in chords marked fortissimo, together with glissando runs that Debussy connected to "d’Artagnan drawing his sword". In a middle section, the left hand holds a pedal point in A♭ whole-tone, to which the right hand adds colours. The conclusion is marked "Tempo di cadenza", again with glissando-figures.

Sarabande is marked "Avec une élégance grave et lente" (With a slow and solemn elegance). Debussy said it should be "rather like an old portrait in the Louvre". Émile Vuillermoz described Debussy's playing of the movement as "with the easy simplicity of a good dancer from the sixteenth century". Hewitt calls it "antique and modern at the same time". The movement has been regarded as "among the most intimate music for the keyboard", showing an affinity to Erik Satie such as his 1887 three dances called Sarabandes.

The last movement is a toccata, marked "Vif" (Lively). It has been described as "poised and energetic, extroverted and graceful" and shows influences from Scarlatti's sonatas. Hewitt notes about the virtuoso writing that speed alone wasn't Debussy's goal, but rather clarity.

A reviewer described the suite as "possibly foreshadowing the neo-classical Debussy that emerged in his last years".

== Recordings ==
Pour le piano has been recorded often, sometimes in recordings of all piano music by Debussy, such as by Walter Gieseking in the 1950s and by Noriko Ogawa in the 2010s. Angela Hewitt recorded it, along with other music by Debussy, in 2011. Several pianists' recordings were published in 2018, the year of the centenary of the composer's death, including Jörg Demus, Peter Frankl, Rafał Blechacz and Samson François within recordings of the composer's complete piano works.
