= At the Theatre =

Painting by Pierre-Auguste Renoir

At the Theatre (La Première Sortie)
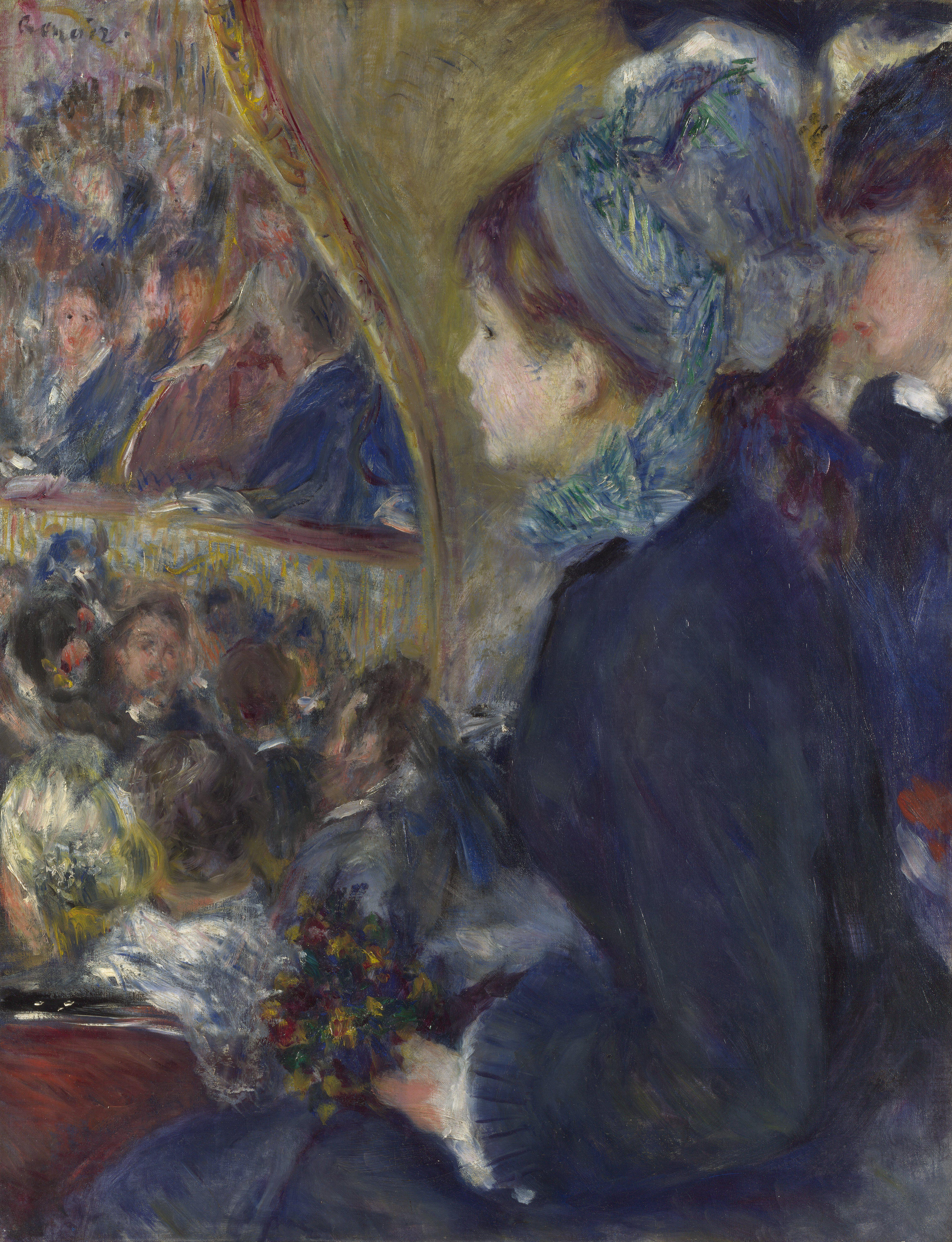
- Artist: Pierre-Auguste Renoir
- Year: 1876–1877
- Medium: Oil on canvas
- Dimensions: 65 cm × 49.5 cm (26 in × 19.5 in)
- Location: National Gallery; London

At the Theatre (La Première Sortie), also known as The First Outing, is an oil-on-canvas painting by the French artist Pierre-Auguste Renoir, created around 1876–1877. It was acquired by the National Gallery in 1923. It shows two beautiful young women in what appears to be an opera box, looking down into the audience in the box below them.

Along with The Small Theater Box (1873–74) and La Loge (1874), it is one of three paintings of a theatre box by Renoir, a then contemporary theme for Parisian fashion.

== Gallery ==
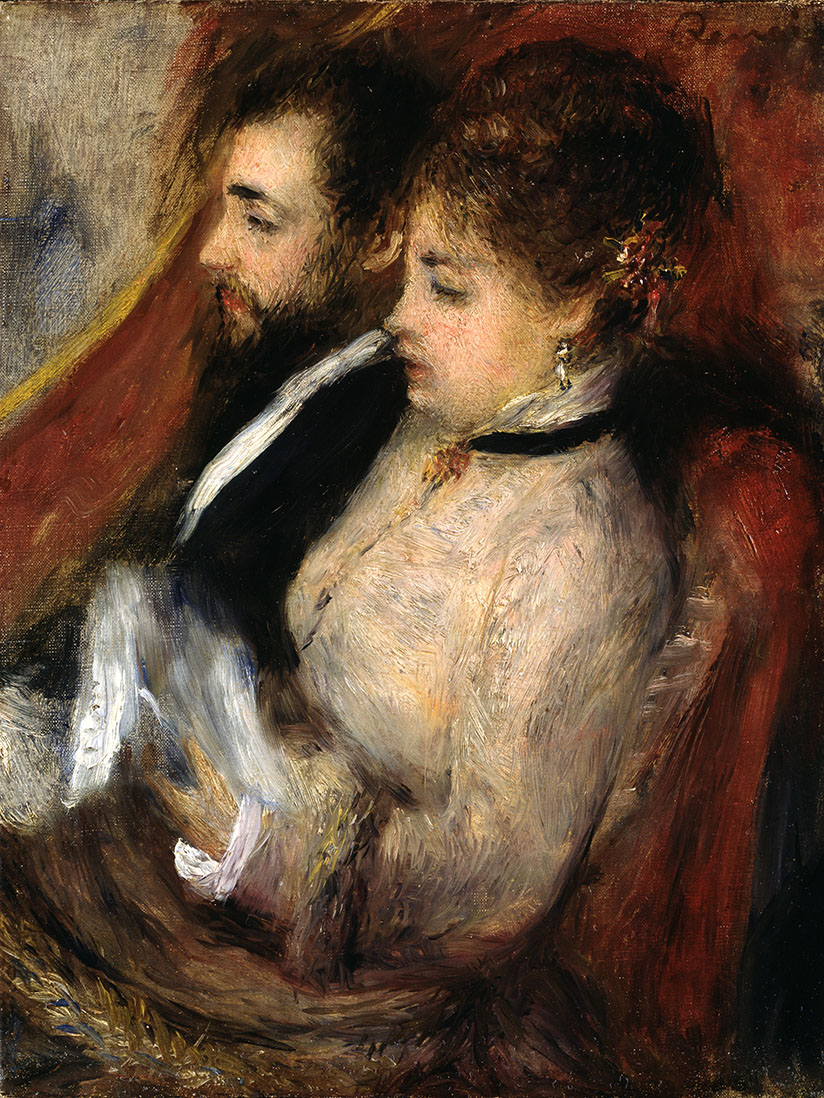
The Small Theater Box (1873–74)

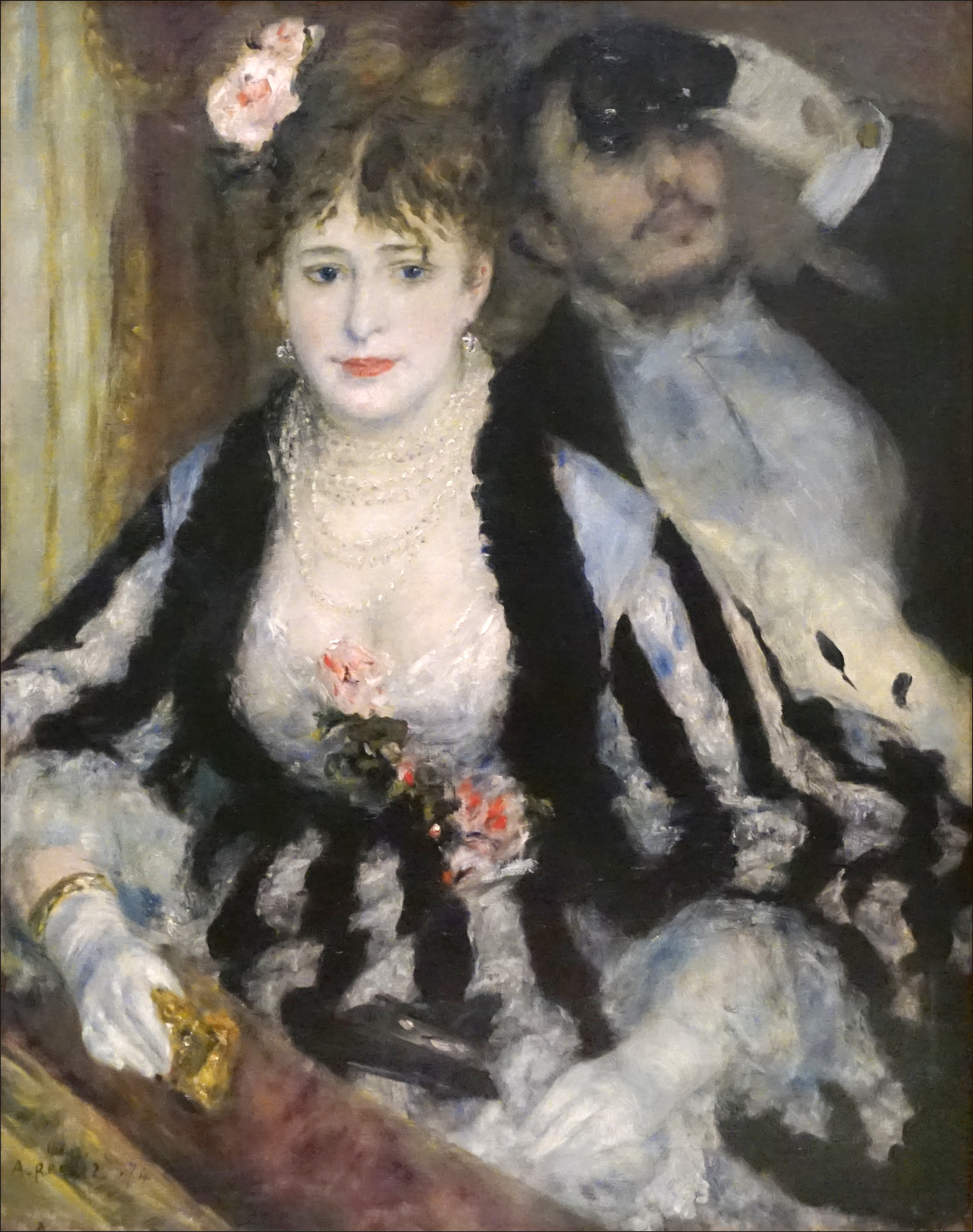
La Loge (1874)

== See also ==
- List of paintings by Pierre-Auguste Renoir
