= Léonard Renoir, The Artist's Father =

Painting by Pierre-Auguste Renoir in the Saint Louis Art Museum

Léonard Renoir, The Artist’s Father
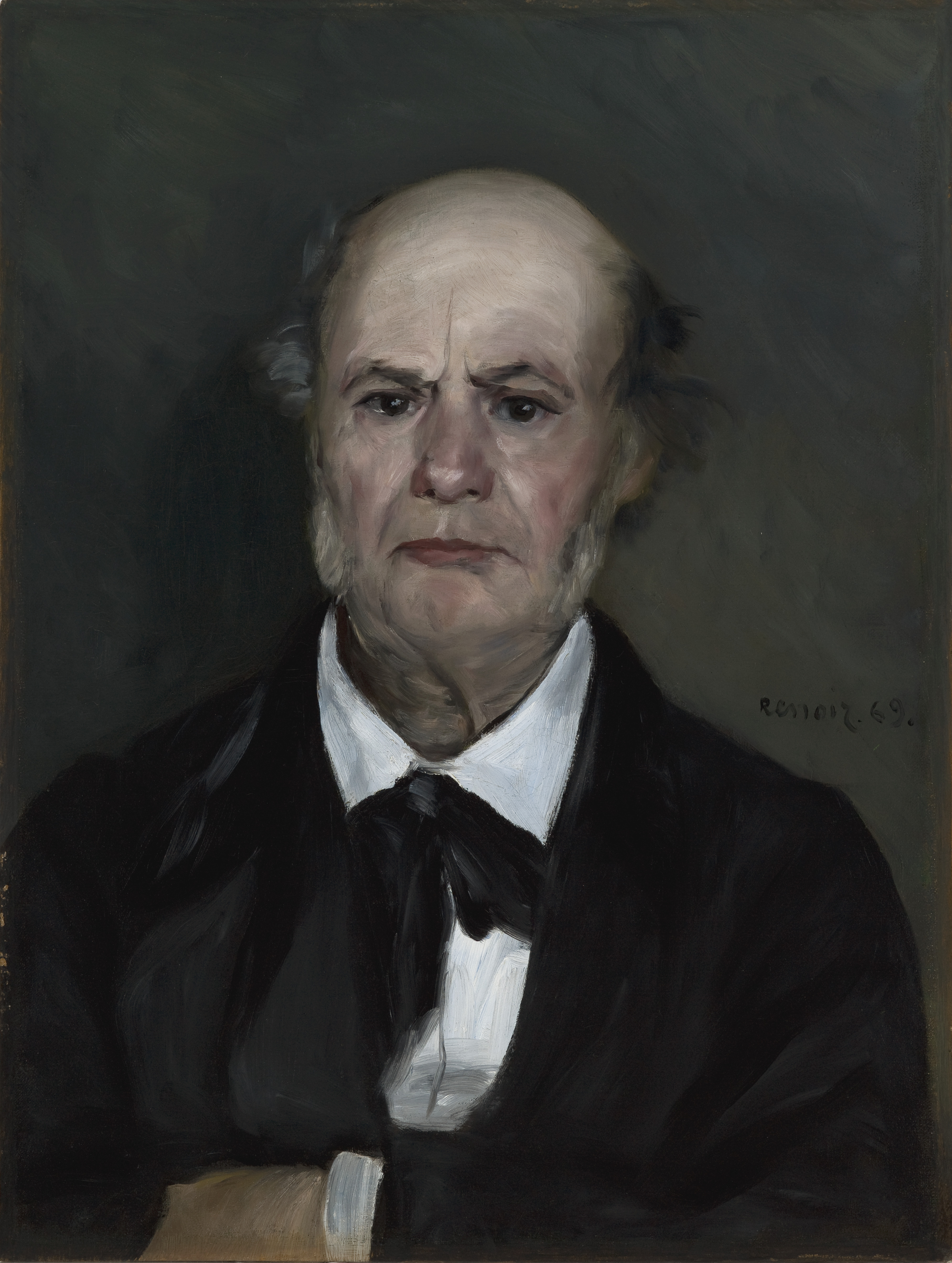
- Year: 1869
- Medium: oil paint, canvas
- Location: Saint Louis Art Museum
- Accession: 37:1933

Léonard Renoir, The Artist's Father is an oil on canvas painting by the French artist Pierre-Auguste Renoir (1841–1919), created in the summer of 1869 at the age of 28. The painting depicts Renoir's father, a tailor, at 70 years old. Due to financial difficulties, Renoir was living with his parents at the time. The Realist conventions are evident, with the portrait showing the influence of Édouard Manet (1832–1883), using a limited palette of black and white to portray Renoir's father's stern demeanor, giving it a "somber and austere" effect. It was painted just before he joined Claude Monet (1840–1926) to work on the Seine at Croissy-sur-Seine.

== See also ==
- List of paintings by Pierre-Auguste Renoir

== Bibliography ==
- Gerstein, Marc S. (1989). Impressionism: Selections from Five American Museums. Hudson Hills Press. ISBN 1-55595-030-2
