= The Bathers (Renoir) =

Painting by Pierre-Auguste Renoir

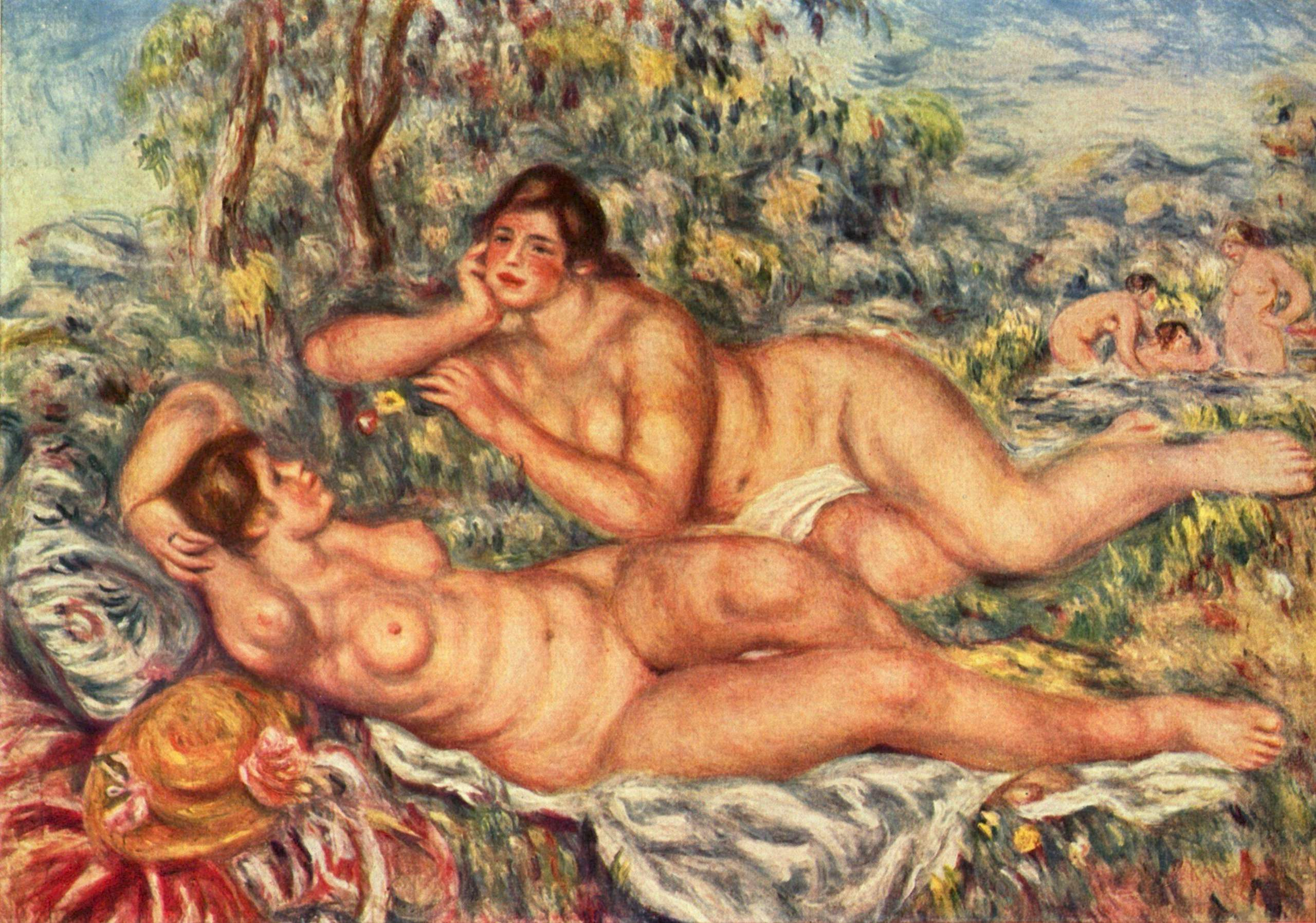
- Artist: Pierre-Auguste Renoir
- Year: 1918–1919
- Medium: Oil on canvas
- Dimensions: 60 cm × 110 cm (24 in × 43 in)
- Location: Musée d'Orsay, Paris

The Bathers (French: Les Baigneuses) is an oil painting on canvas made between 1918 and 1919 by the French painter Pierre-Auguste Renoir. After being given to the State by his three sons in 1923, it is currently kept at the Musée d'Orsay in Paris. It is representative of Renoir's late work period (1892–1919).

The painting depicts two groups of nude women: two lying in the foreground and three bathers in the background to the right. One of the models of this painting is Andrée Hessling, who became the first wife of Renoir's son, Jean. The natural setting displayed in the painting was the large garden of the house owned by the painter in Cagnes-sur-Mer.

In the painting, Renoir removed any reference to the contemporary world and showed "a timeless nature". The theme of the bather is predominant in the final season of Renoir's paintings: the women portrayed by the painter are free and uninhibited. These bathers are "melted in the nature and the forms merge with the trees, flowers and the shares of red water".

The painting received criticism because of "the enormousness of the legs and arms, the weakness of flesh, and the pinkish color of the models".

== See also ==
- Blonde Bather (1881 and 1882)
- List of paintings by Pierre-Auguste Renoir
