= Frédéric Bazille at his Easel =

Painting by Auguste Renoir

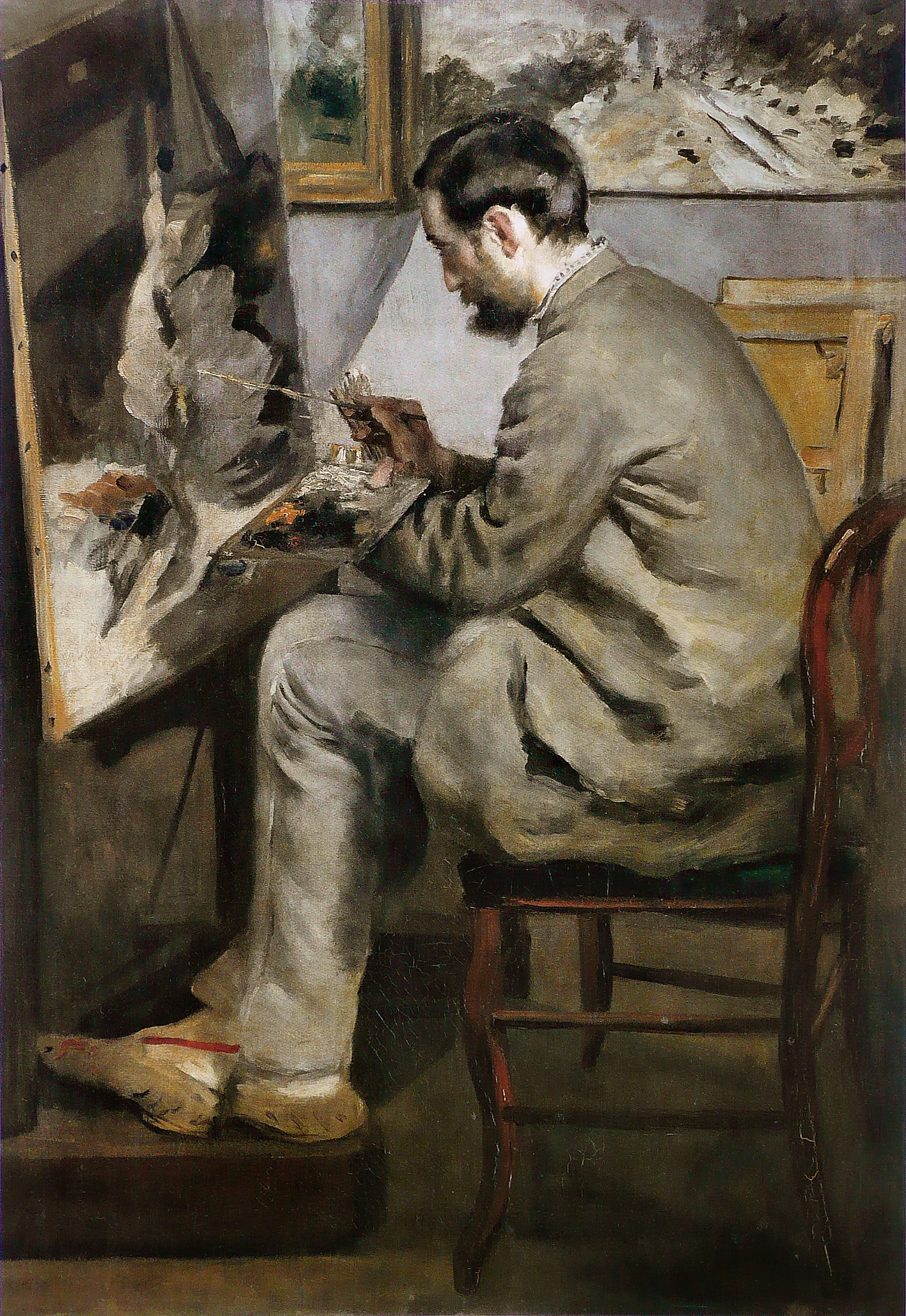
- Artist: Auguste Renoir
- Year: 1867
- Medium: oil on canvas
- Dimensions: 105 cm × 73.5 cm (41 in × 28.9 in)

Frédéric Bazille at his Easel is an 1867 oil-on-canvas painting by Auguste Renoir, produced in response to Frédéric Bazille's own 1867 portrait of Renoir. It is owned by the Musée d'Orsay, which deposited it in 2006 at the Musée Fabre in Montpellier, Bazille's birthplace.

The painting shows Bazille working on his still-life of a heron, which is also in the Musée Fabre.

== Gallery ==
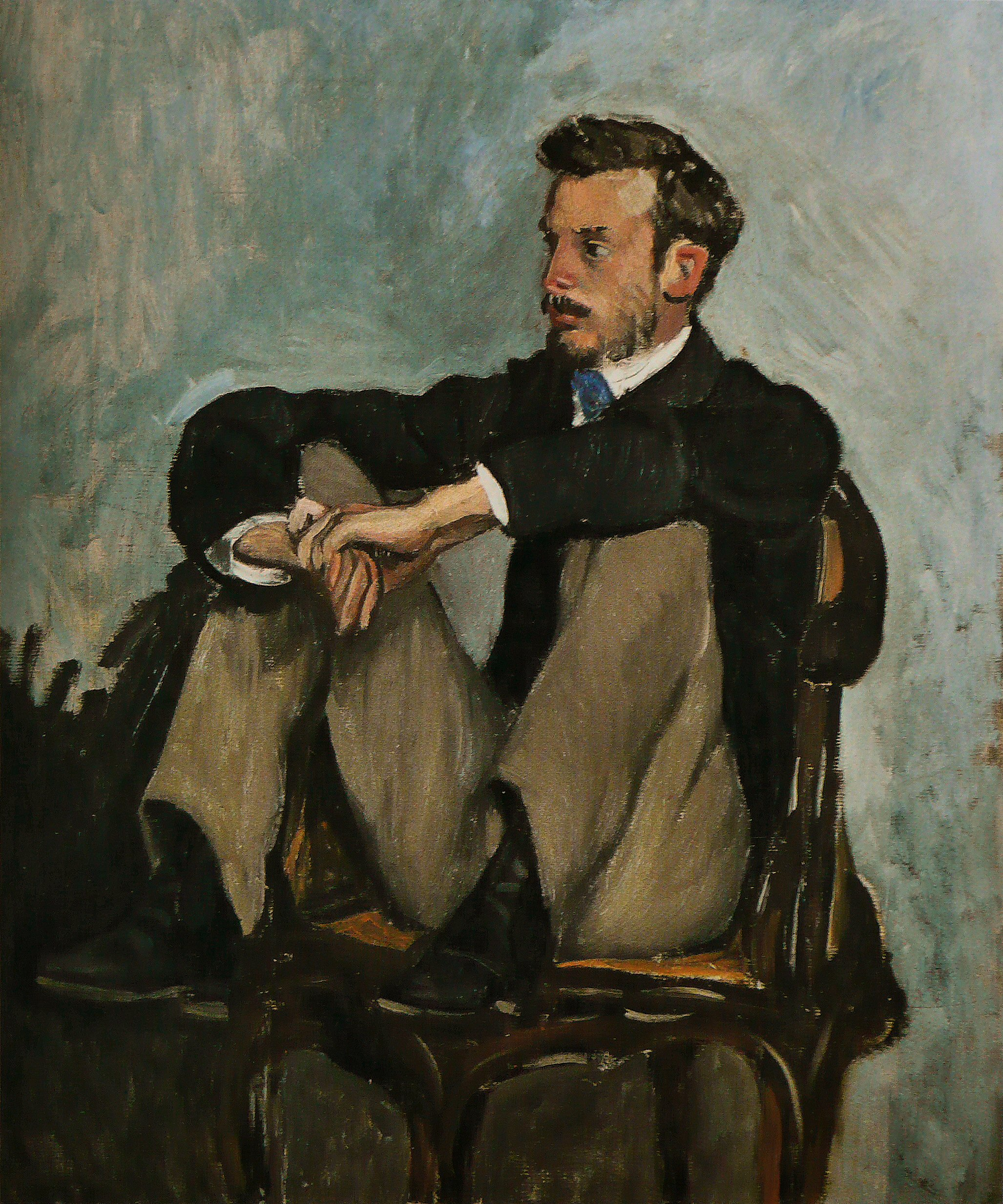
Bazille's portrait of Renoir, 1867.

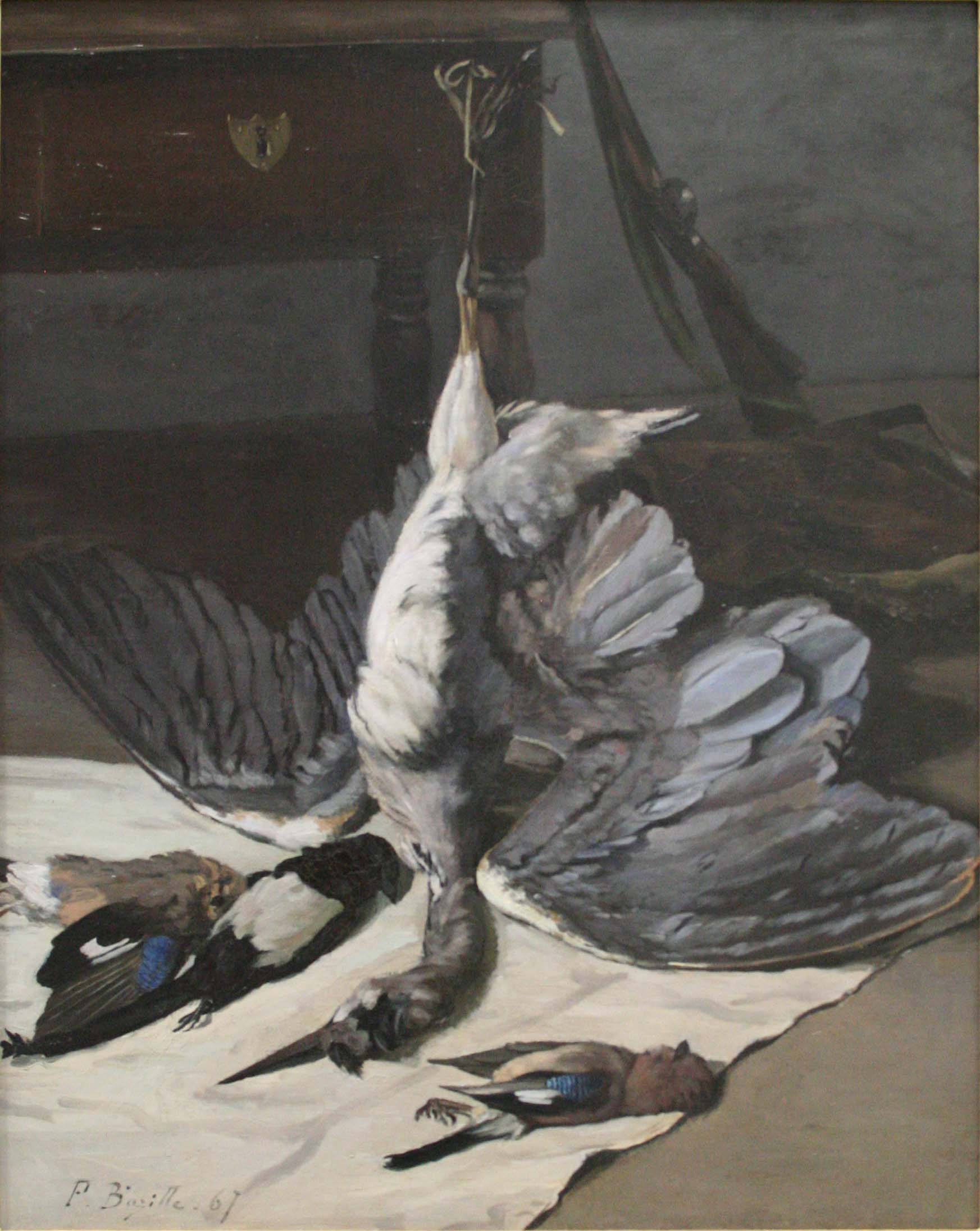
Bazille's version of the heron, 1867

== See also ==
- List of paintings by Pierre-Auguste Renoir

== Bibliography ==
- (in French) Francesca Castellani (trad. Marie-Christine Gamberini), Renoir : sa vie, son œuvre [« Renoir »], Paris, Gründ, 1996, 272 p. (ISBN 978-2-7000-2068-7).
- (in French) Anne Distel, Renoir : « Il faut embellir », Paris, Gallimard, coll. « Découvertes Gallimard / Arts » (nº 177), 2009, 175 p. (ISBN 978-2-0704-0243-4).r
