= The Farm at Les Collettes, Cagnes =

Painting by Auguste Renoir

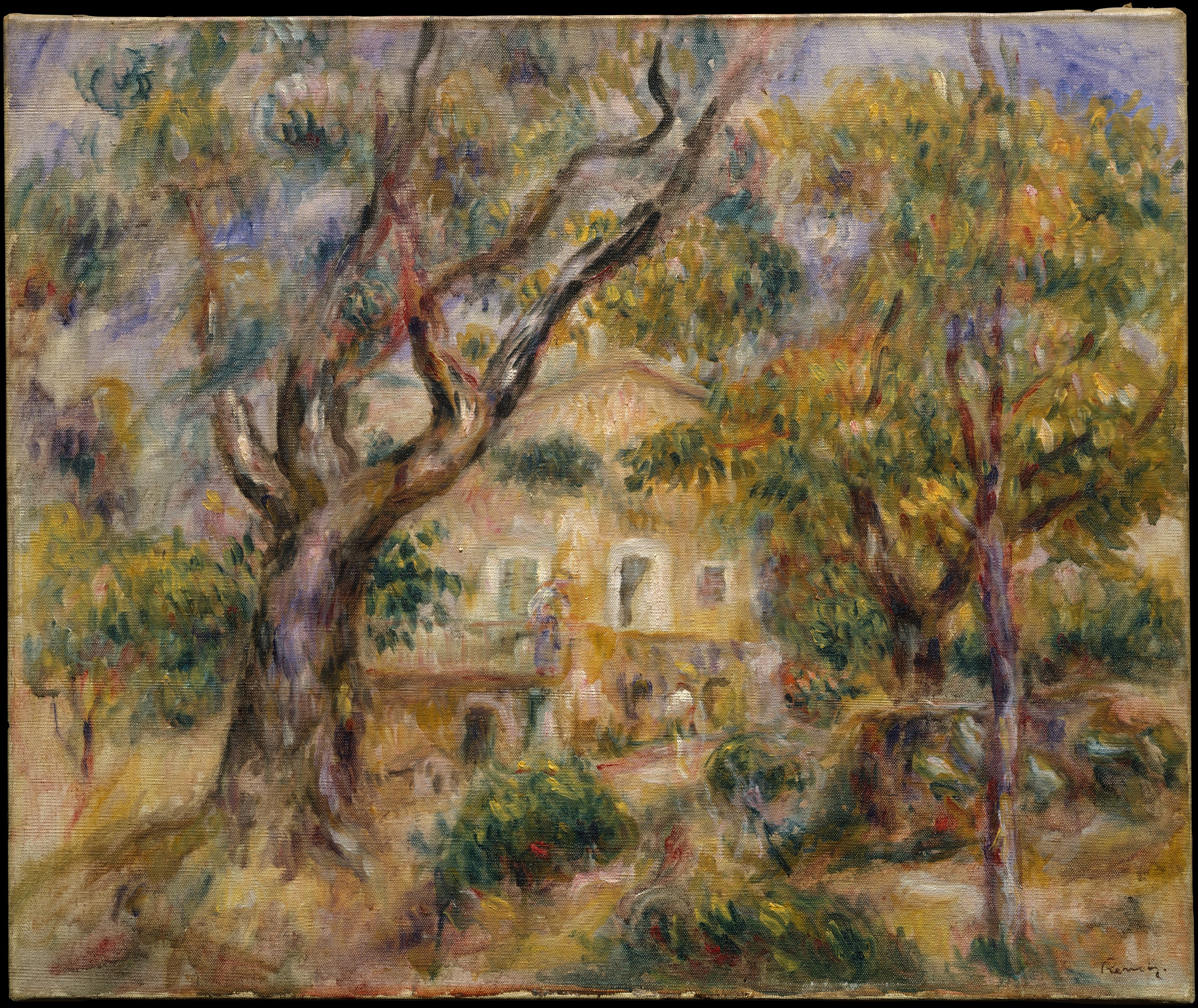
- Artist: Pierre-Auguste Renoir
- Year: c. 1908–14
- Medium: Oil on canvas
- Dimensions: 54.6 cm × 65.4 cm (21.5 in × 25.7 in)
- Location: Metropolitan Museum of Art; New York City

The Farm at Les Collettes, Cagnes is a late work period (1908–14) canvas painting by French artist Pierre-Auguste Renoir. It is in the collection of the Metropolitan Museum of Art.

The painting depicts the farm in Cagnes-sur-Mer on the Mediterranean coast of Southern France, to which Renoir was forced to relocate in 1908 to help alleviate the effects of his rheumatoid arthritis. Although the original farmhouse is depicted in the painting, Renoir actually lived in a newly built house elsewhere on the estate.

== See also ==
- List of paintings by Pierre-Auguste Renoir
