= In the Garden – Under the Arbour at the Moulin de la Galette =

Painting by Pierre-Auguste Renoir

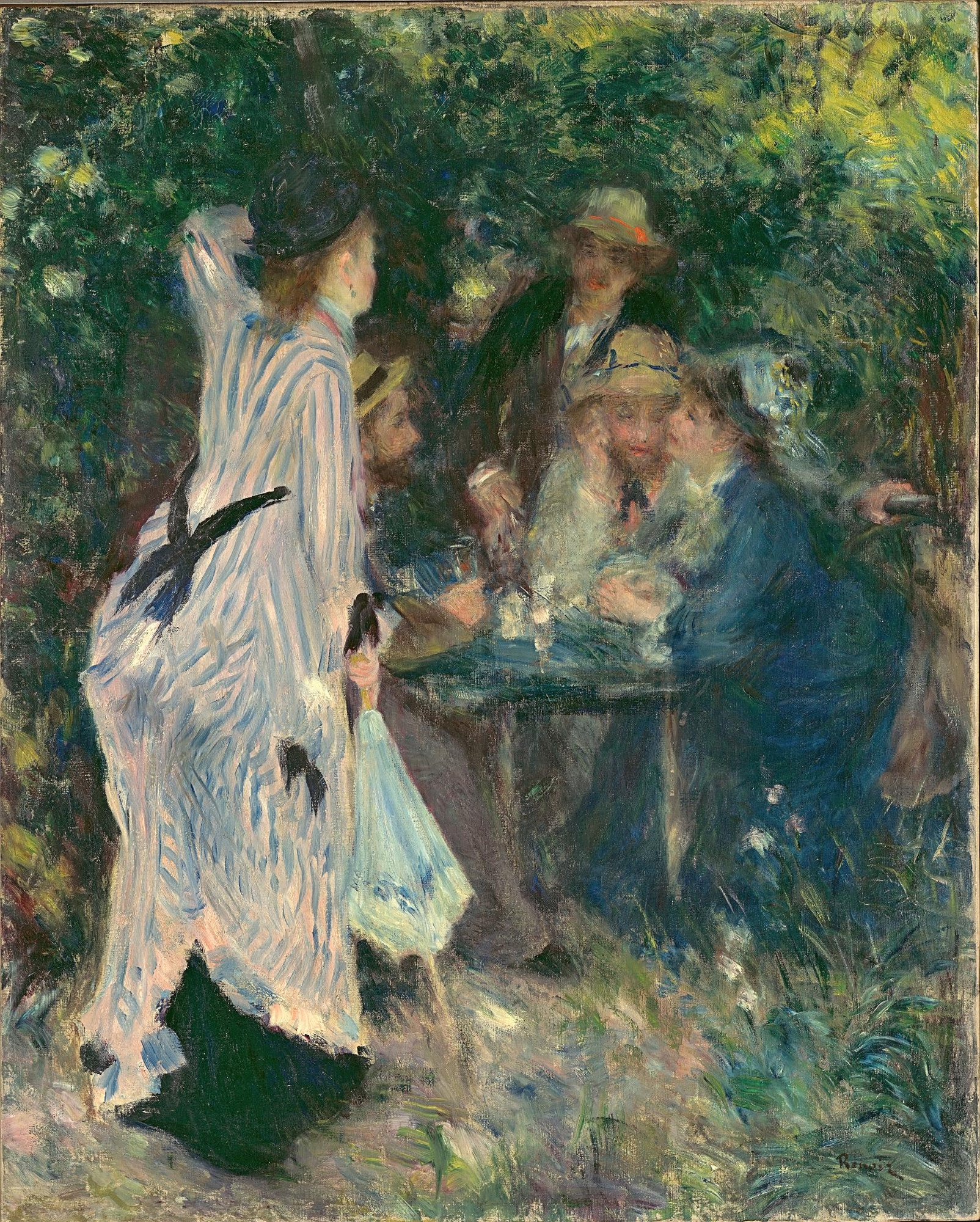
- Artist: Pierre-Auguste Renoir
- Year: 1875
- Medium: oil on canvas
- Dimensions: 81 cm × 65 cm (32 in × 26 in)
- Location: Pushkin Museum of Fine Arts; Moscow

In the Garden – Under the Arbour at the Moulin de la Galette (French: Au jardin – Sous la tonnelle au moulin de la Galette) is an oil painting on canvas of 1875 by Pierre-Auguste Renoir, painted in his studio on Rue Cortot in Montmartre. It was acquired by the Russian businessman Ivan Morozov, from whose collection it was seized in 1919 during the October Revolution. It was initially assigned to the State Museum of Modern Western Art in Moscow and was then transferred to its present home in the Pushkin Museum in 1948.

== See also ==
- List of paintings by Pierre-Auguste Renoir
