= Young Women in Black =

Painting by Auguste Renoir

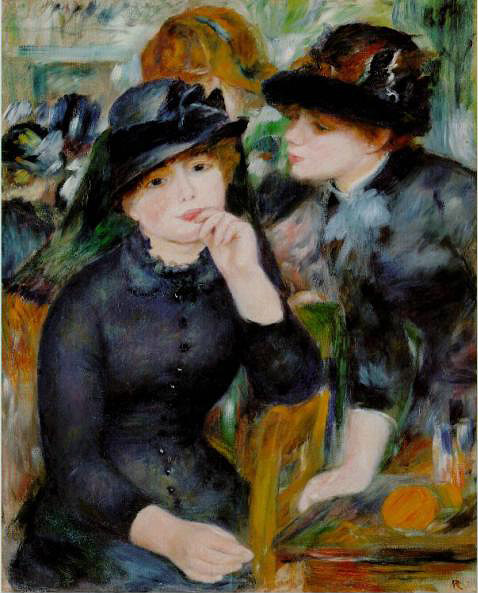
- Artist: Pierre-Auguste Renoir
- Year: 1880
- Medium: Oil on canvas
- Dimensions: 81.3 cm × 65.2 cm (32.0 in × 25.7 in)
- Location: Pushkin Museum; Moscow

Young Women in Black or Young Girls in Black (French - Jeunes Filles en noir) is an 1880–1882 painting by Pierre-Auguste Renoir, which since 1948 has been in the Pushkin Museum in Moscow..

From 1908 to 1918 it was in Sergei Schukin's collection. In 1918 it was moved to the 1st Museum of New Western Painting, which five years later merged with the 2nd Museum of New Western Painting to form the State Museum of New Western Art, where the painting remained until that institution was abolished in 1948

== See also ==
- List of paintings by Pierre-Auguste Renoir
