= Yvonne and Christine Lerolle at the Piano =

1897 painting by Pierre-Auguste Renoir

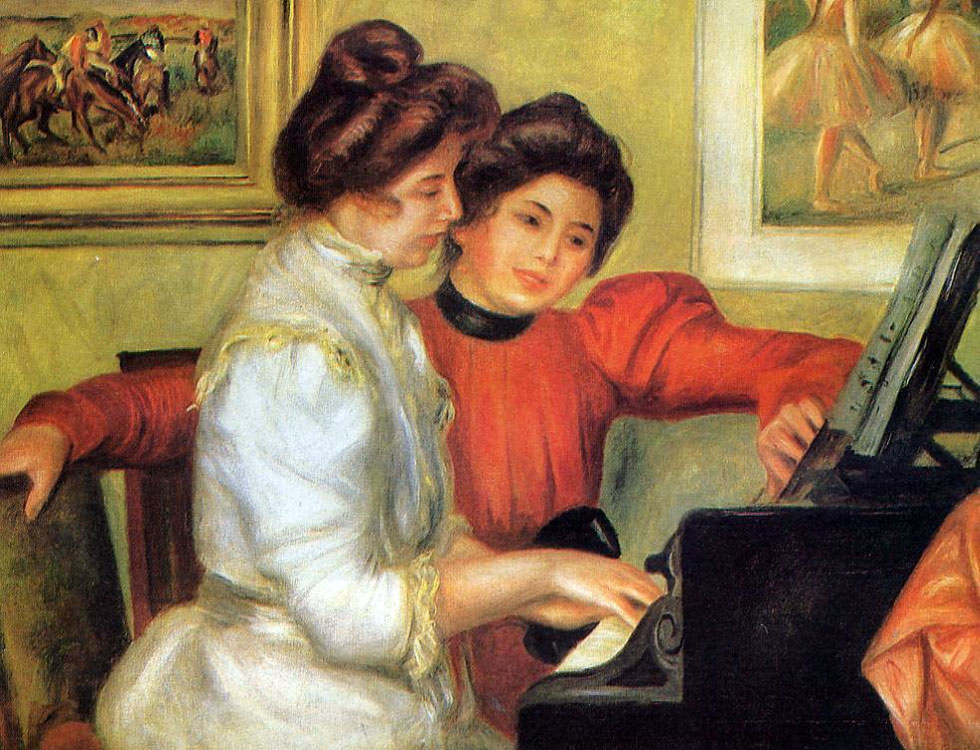
- Artist: Pierre-Auguste Renoir
- Year: 1897
- Medium: Oil on canvas
- Dimensions: 73 cm × 92 cm (29 in × 36 in)
- Location: Musée de l'Orangerie, Paris

Yvonne and Christine Lerolle at the Piano (French: Yvonne et Christine Lerolle au piano) is an 1897 oil painting by the French painter Pierre-Auguste Renoir representing his late work period (1892–1919). It is kept at the Musée de l'Orangerie in Paris.

== Background ==
Renoir achieved great success with his portraits, becoming the favourite painter for the French bourgeoisie. This meant that the Parisian bourgeoisie accepted impressionist painters and rejected the works of academic masters. The Lerolle family was a great protector of the new creators, especially French Impressionist artist Edgar Degas (1834–1917).

== Description ==
Yvonne dresses in white and strives to play a piece on the piano while her sister Christine contemplates the score in an accomplice way. Although Renoir does not renounce capturing natural light and colour, he is particularly interested in the modelling and drawing of the figures, wrapped in an atmosphere that does not manage to dilute the contours like Claude Monet (1840–1926), the French painter and founder of Impressionism.

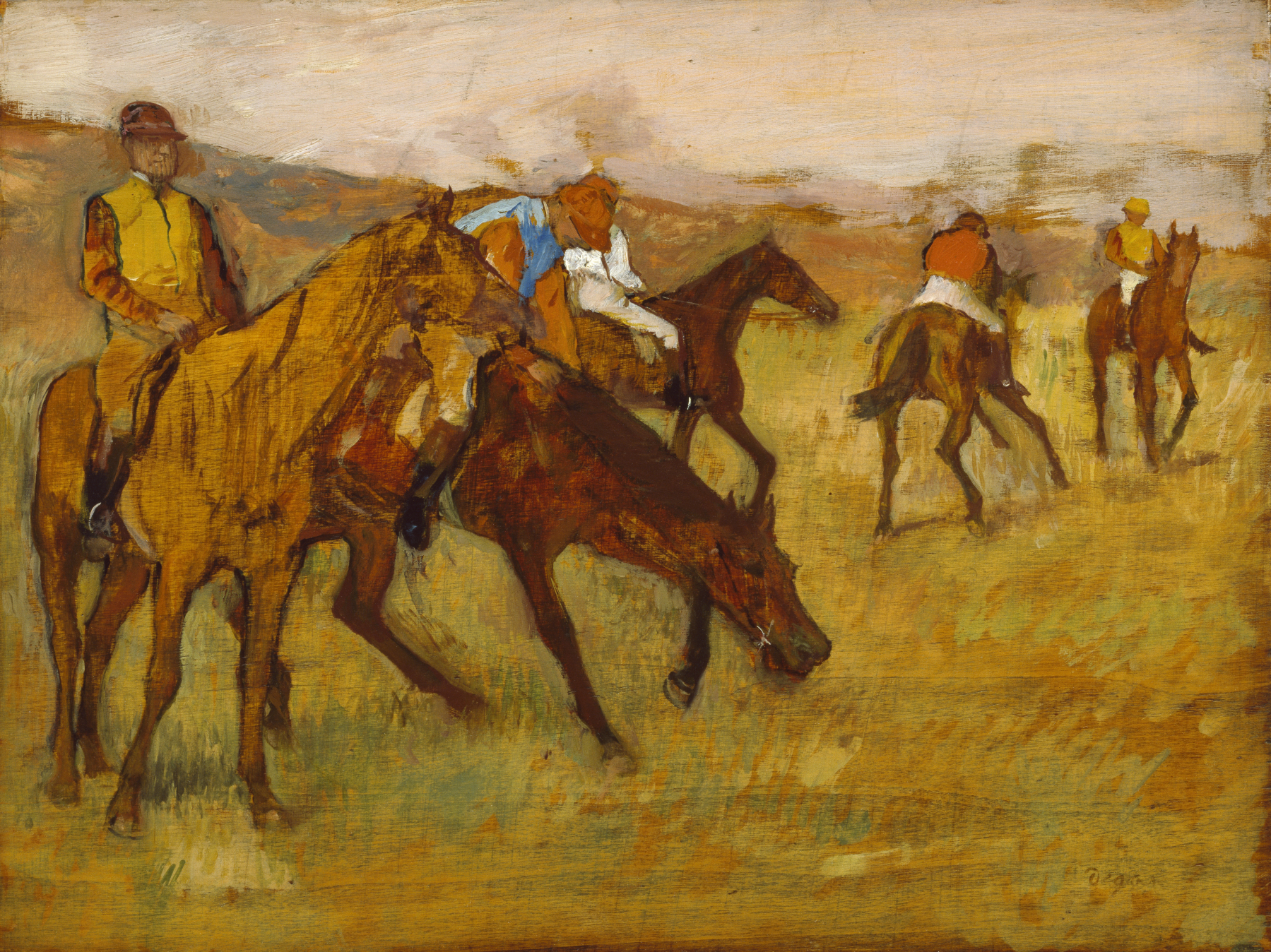
Before the Race (1882–1884), Edgar Degas

The expressiveness of the two models is another point of reference in the work, although in recent works Renoir does not load the inks on the personality of his models as in his early works (see Léonard Renoir or Victor Chocquet). In this way, Renoir presents himself as a painter who gives joy and a certain romanticism to his compositions, achieving an important success before the public, as proof that this work was the first acquired by the French State.

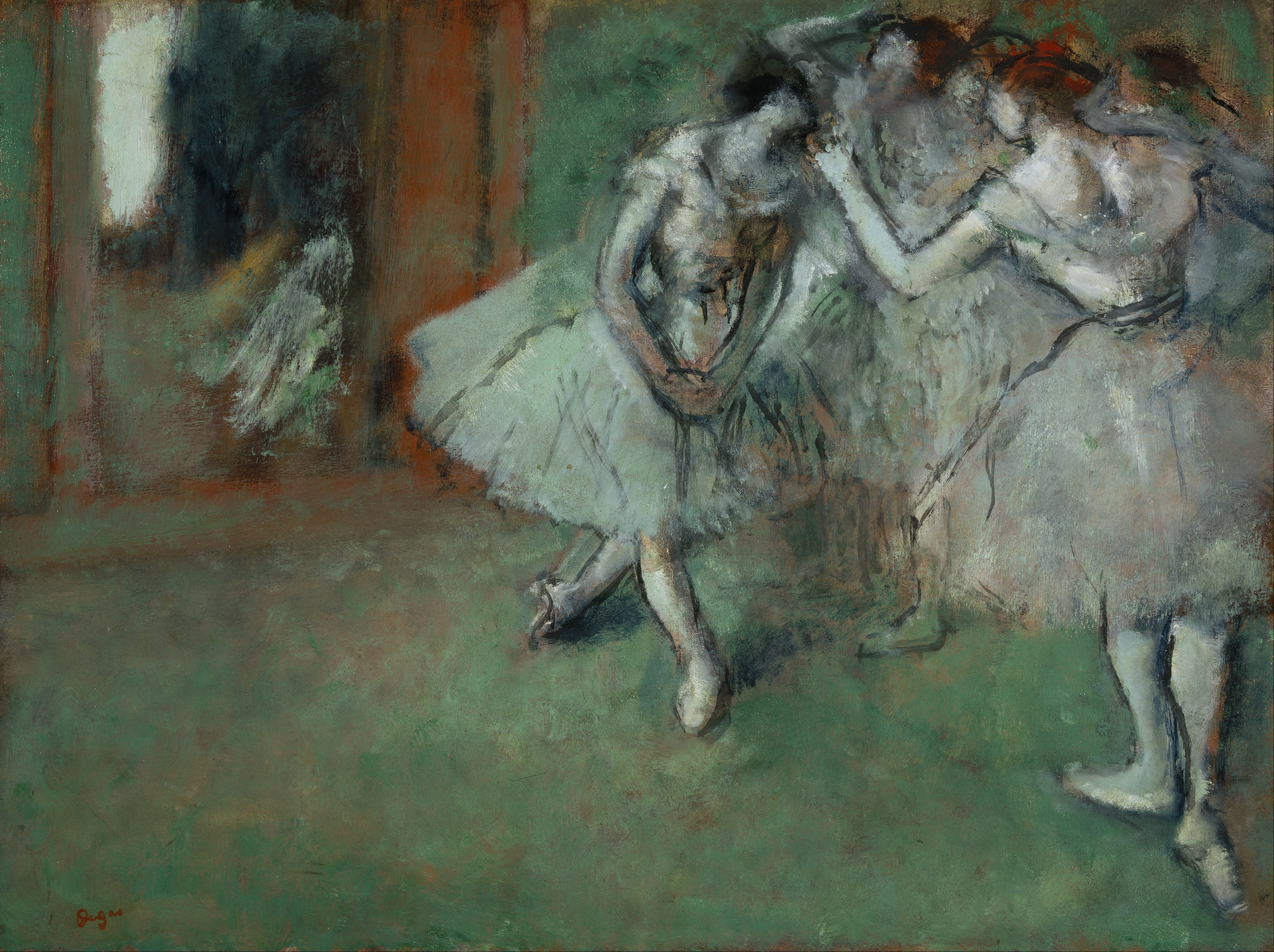
A Group of Dancers (1890), Edgar Degas

Like Girls at the Piano (1892) before it, Yvonne and Christine Lerolle at the Piano is also significant on the formal level since the pictorial material here is no longer treated with the severely linear style of the previous decade, but with a renewed freshness and a recovery of the chromatic harmonies typical of the impressionist phase of the painter. An optimistic theme, much loved by bourgeois collectors, is portrayed: that of girls in a domestic atmosphere, playing games, reading or, as in this case, practicing music.

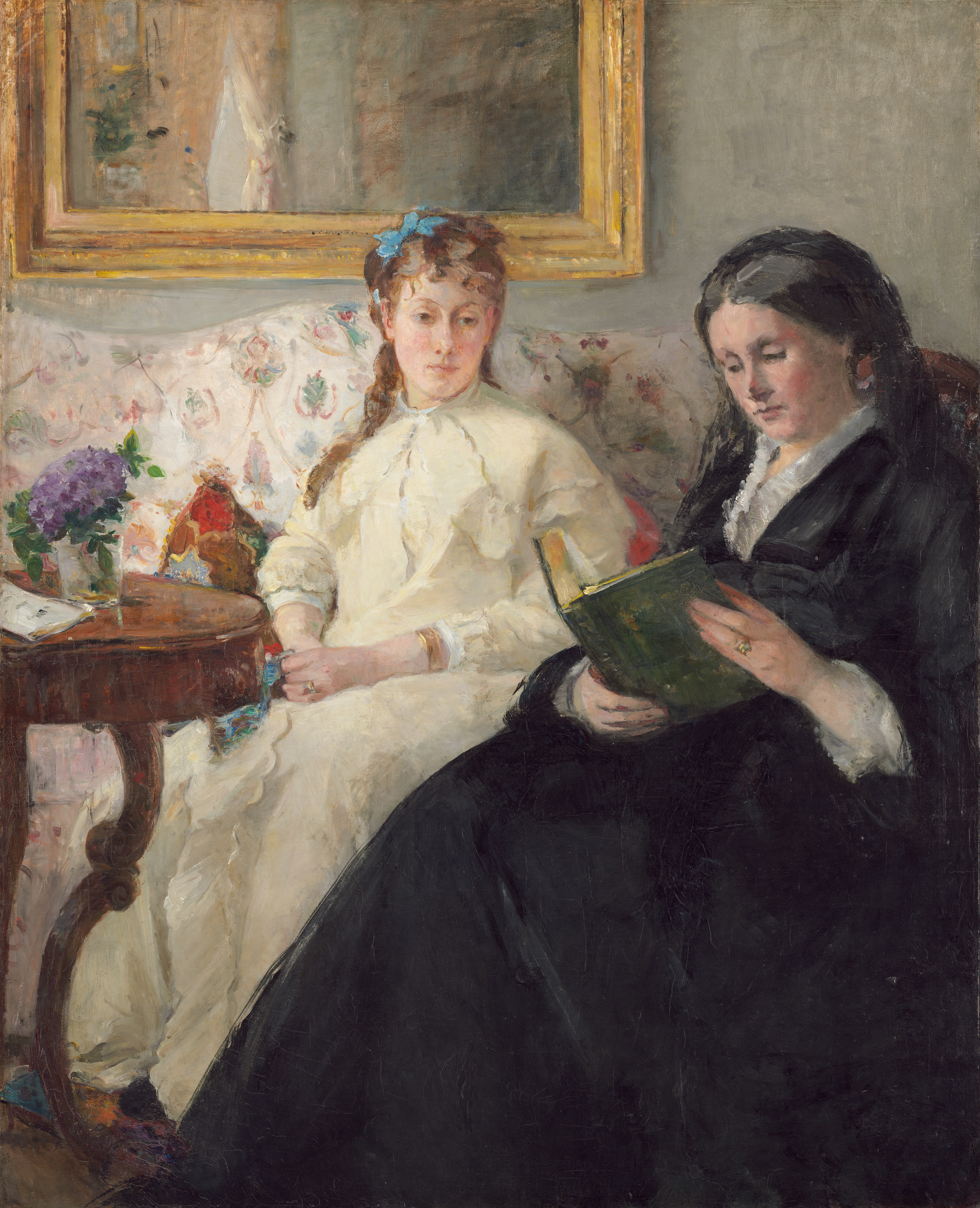
The Mother and Sister of the Artist (1869–70), Berthe Morisot

Renoir describes with great precision various details of the domestic environment in which the girls find themselves, focusing mainly on the two paintings hanging on the wall, in this case Before the Race and A Group of Dancers, both by Degas. The dominant colour is the white of the girl's dress in the foreground, which, however, does not resolve itself in the soft luminosity that flooded Girls at the Piano, creating an all in all cold atmosphere.

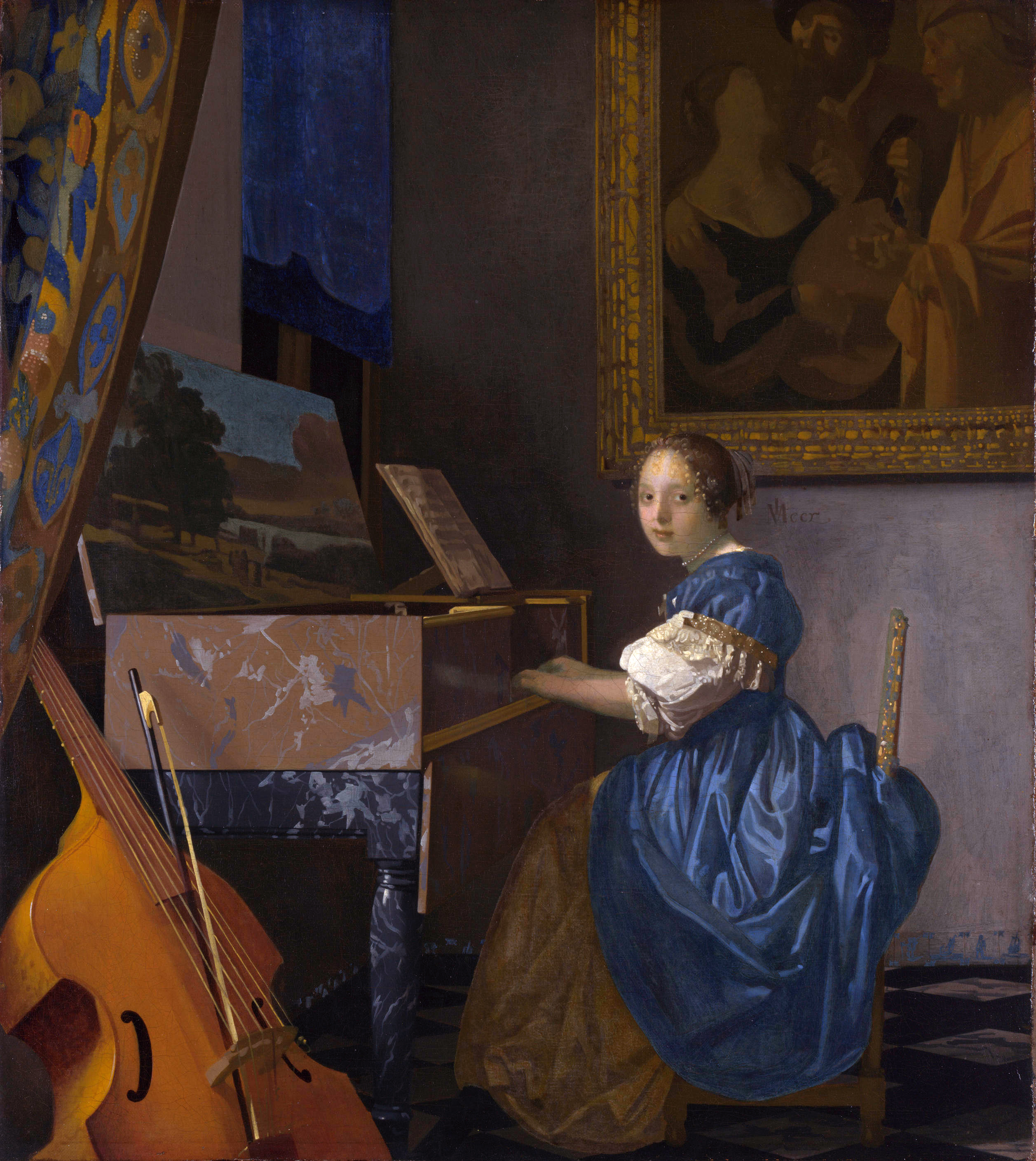
A Lady Seated at a Virginal (1670–1672), Johannes Vermeer

Renoir addresses several iconographic models in this canvas. Transparent is the reference to contemporary paintings by French Impressionist painter Berthe Morisot (1841–1895), who loved to paint domestic scenes of this type: in the nineteenth century, in fact, the home assumed new meanings, and became a place to escape from the alienating and depersonalizing frenzy of modern civilization. The scene as a whole is also linked to the genre scenes of 17th century Dutch painters, especially Dutch Baroque Period painter Johannes Vermeer (1632–1675), the author of paintings that stand out for their tame, pearly quietness.

== Provenance ==
The painting, completed in 1897, was purchased by Henry Roujon during the exhibition dedicated to the painter. At the instigation of Stéphane Mallarmé, Roujon intended to create a collection of living artists, of contemporary art, to be permanently exhibited at the Luxembourg Palace in Paris: this is a detail that shows how, at the end of the 19th century, Renoir had by then become one of the most famous French artists. Today the painting is on display at the Musée de l'Orangerie.

== See also ==
- List of paintings by Pierre-Auguste Renoir
