= Portrait of William Sisley =

1864 painting by Pierre-Auguste Renoir

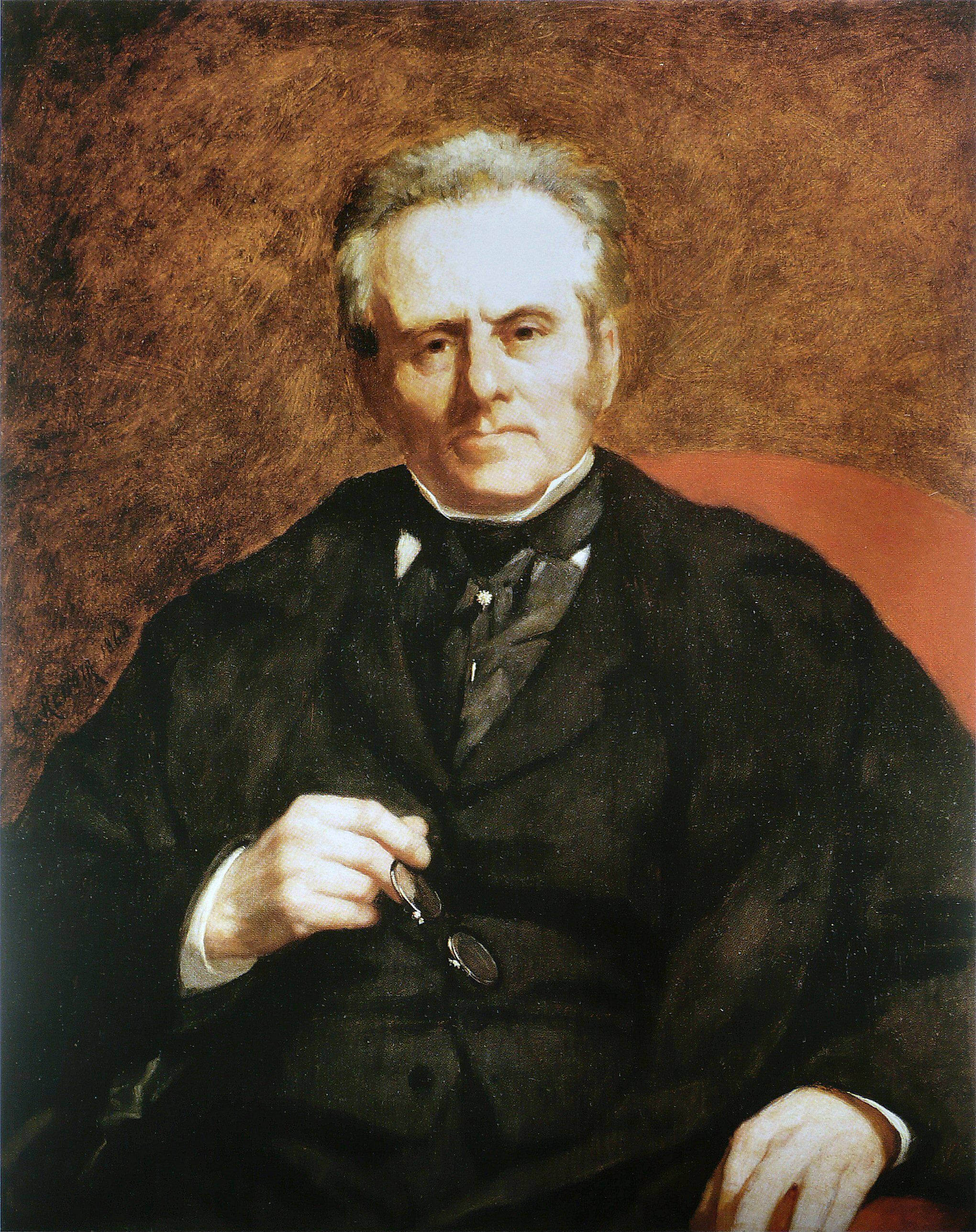
- Artist: Pierre-Auguste Renoir
- Year: 1864
- Medium: Oil on canvas
- Dimensions: 81 cm × 65 cm (32 in × 26 in)
- Location: Musée d'Orsay; Paris, France

Portrait of William Sisley is an oil-on-canvas painting by the French artist Pierre-Auguste Renoir, created in 1864 during his early Salon and Fontainebleau period. It was first exhibited under the title Portrait de M. W. S. at the Salon of 1865, where it was accepted along with Summer Evening (Soirée d'été), a painting now considered lost. It was likely commissioned from Renoir by his friend Alfred Sisley to help him with his financial difficulties. The painting portrays Sisley's father, William, a businessman born in France in 1799 to an English father. Portrait of William Sisley is currently held by the Musée d'Orsay.

This early work shows the influence of Realism on Renoir, exemplified by artists like Gustave Courbet, as well as the Neoclassicism of Jean-Auguste-Dominique Ingres, a favorite of Renoir's.

== See also ==
- List of paintings by Pierre-Auguste Renoir
