= Nature morte: fleurs =

1885 painting by Pierre-Auguste Renoir

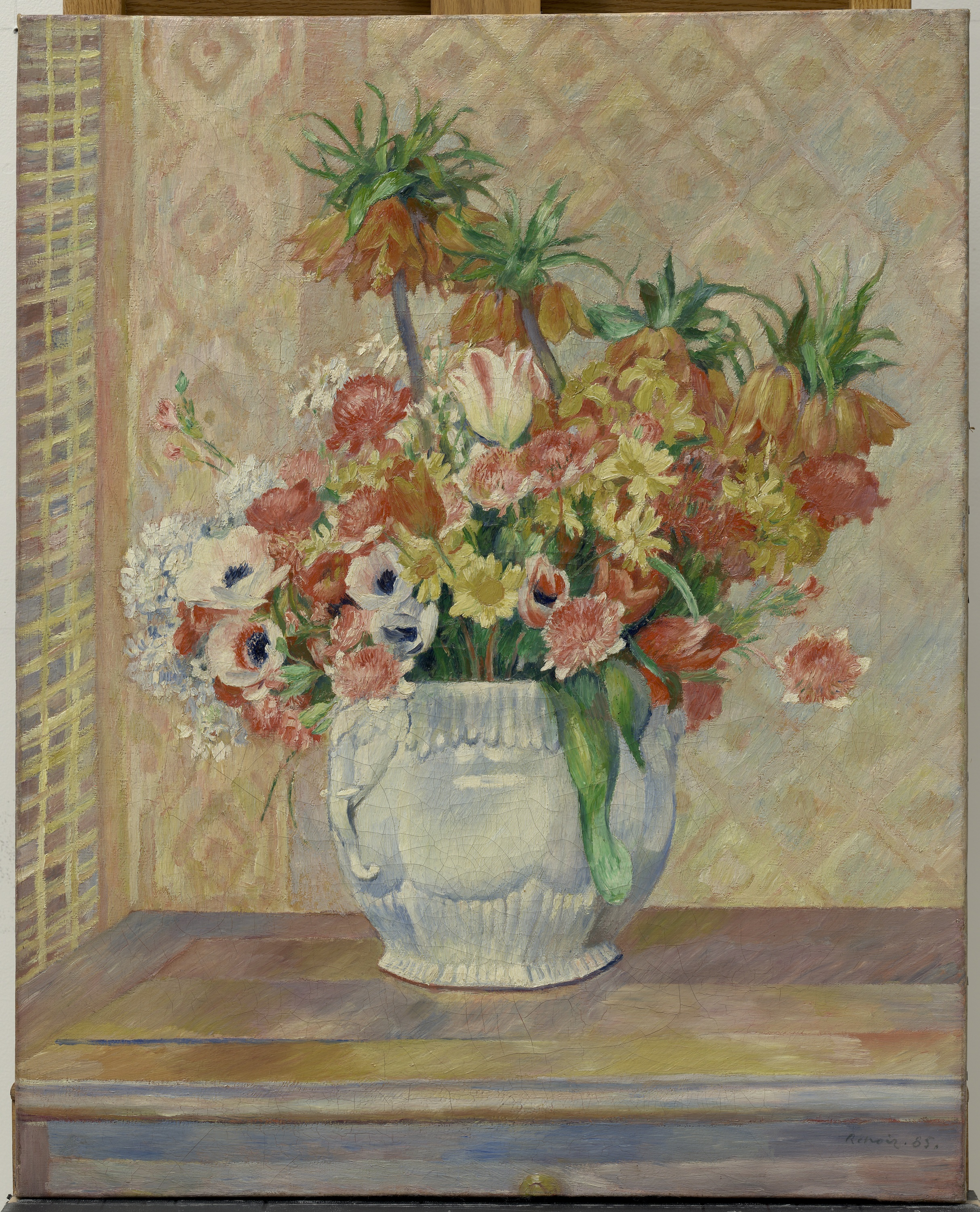
- Artist: Pierre-Auguste Renoir
- Year: 1885
- Medium: oil on canvas
- Dimensions: 81.9 cm × 65.8 cm (32.2 in × 25.9 in)
- Location: Solomon R. Guggenheim Museum; New York
- Accession: 78.2514.70

Still Life: Flowers (Nature morte: fleurs) is an oil on canvas by Pierre-Auguste Renoir in the Thannhauser Collection at the Guggenheim Museum, New York.

This 1885 painting is similar to Still Life: Flowers and Prickly Pears believed to be painted a year earlier, but in this case Renoir did not include the fruit and table cloth and was more restrained in his use of color.

== See also ==
- List of paintings by Pierre-Auguste Renoir
