= Skaters in the Bois de Boulogne =

Painting by Pierre-Auguste Renoir

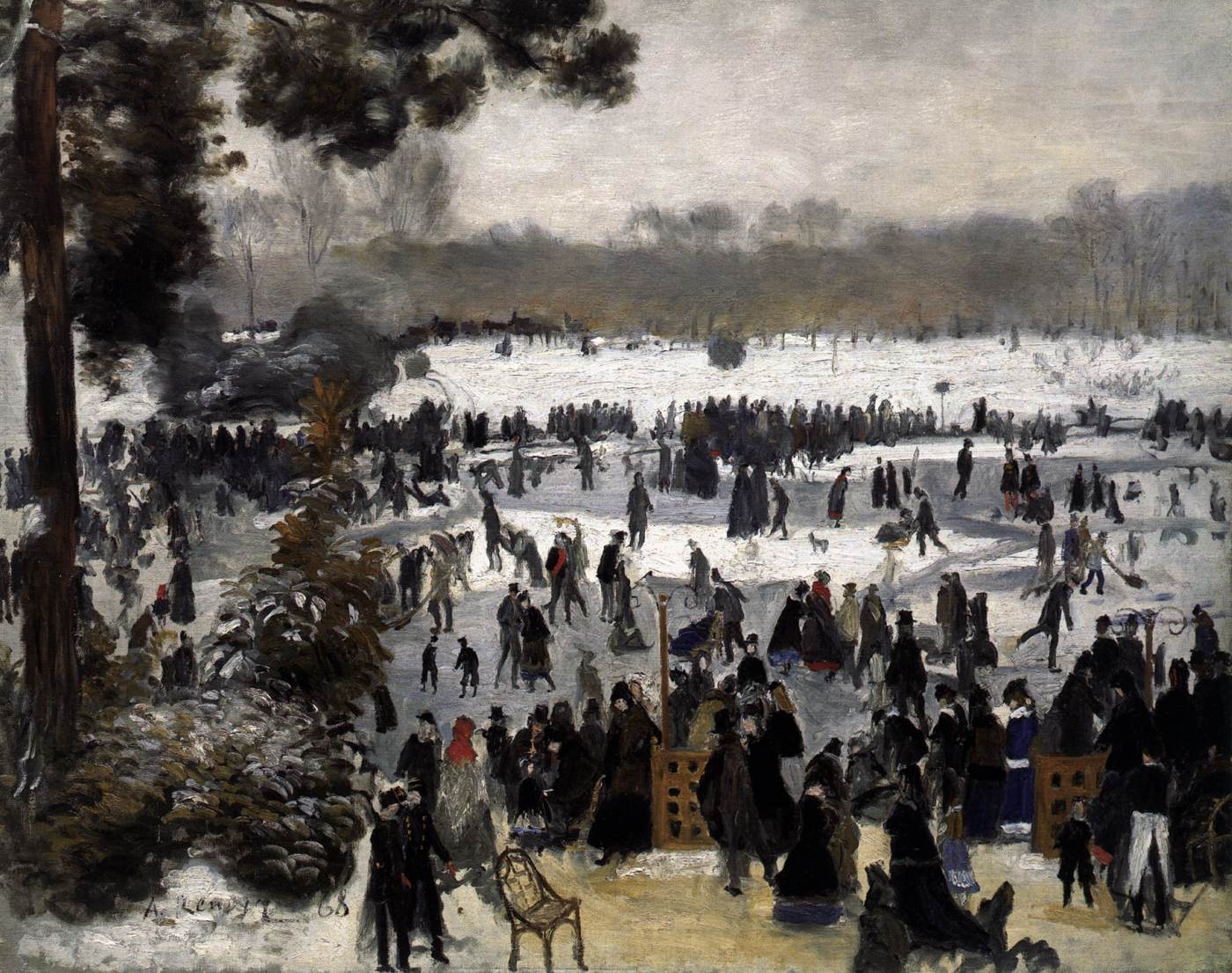
- Artist: Pierre-Auguste Renoir
- Year: 1868
- Medium: Oil on canvas
- Dimensions: 72.1 cm × 89.9 cm (28.4 in × 35.4 in)
- Location: Private collection

Skaters in the Bois de Boulogne (French: Les patineurs à Longchamp) is an oil-on-canvas landscape painting by the French artist Pierre-Auguste Renoir, created during the winter of 1868. The painting depicts a snowscape with many Parisians, young and old, spending leisure time on a frozen park lake. Due to Renoir's strong dislike of cold temperatures and snow, the piece is one of his few winter landscapes.

== Background ==
Pierre-Auguste Renoir (1841–1919) first met landscape painters Alfred Sisley (1839–1899), Claude Monet (1840–1926), and figure painter Frédéric Bazille (1841–1870) at the art studio of Swiss artist Charles Gleyre in 1861. In addition to their friendship, all would prove influential in Renoir's work. For the next several years, Renoir attended the École des Beaux-Arts. He first exhibited a large painting at the Salon in 1863, but destroyed his work. That same year, Renoir was living in a studio with Bazille who introduced him to Paul Cézanne (1839–1906) and Camille Pissarro (1830–1903).

An early painting, The Cabaret of Mère Anthony (1866), represents for Renoir "some of the most agreeable memories" of his life with friends at a village inn during this time. He soon moved to the village of Chailly near Marlotte and the forest of Fontainebleau, and began working with model Lise Tréhot who posed for him between 1866 and 1872. Renoir began painting at La Grenouillère, a popular middle class day resort with a floating dance hall, in late 1868. Like Monet and several other Impressionists, Renoir worked en plein air, painting outdoors, but unlike Monet, who was known for painting in the cold and snow, Renoir was not fond of cold temperatures. Years later, he told art dealer Ambroise Vollard that he could not stand the cold: "But then, even if you can stand the cold, why paint snow? It is a blight on the face of Nature." Although it is unknown when his symptoms began, Renoir was known to suffer from rheumatoid arthritis from at least 1892 onward, an affliction which would severely restrict his artistic production in late life.

== Description ==
Renoir, who was then 26 years old, painted Skaters in the Bois de Boulogne in the public park of Bois de Boulogne in Paris en plein air during the cold winter month of January 1868. Newspaper accounts of the time recorded freezing temperatures allowing people to walk across the Seine and ice skate on rivers and streams. Due to Renoir's dislike of cold temperatures, it is one of the few winter landscapes he completed aside from a few minor studies. At the time of the painting, the park itself was relatively new, with construction beginning in 1852 under a public works program led by Georges-Eugène Haussmann under the direction of Napoleon III. Under Haussmann's renovation of Paris, the Bois de Boulogne was completed in 1858.

The scene is thought to have been painted near the Lac pour le patinage (Skating Lake), an artificial lake. Renoir chose the park because he preferred painting crowds. The painting has an unfinished, sketch-like quality to it, in the style of a pochade, but the brushwork is bold and the composition fully realized. The scene represents the western part of the park, using an elevated perspective. The theme evokes older Dutch ice skating landscapes made popular by painters like Hendrick Avercamp (1585–1634). Several dogs can be seen in the work, reflecting Renoir's thematic interest in the lives of the Parisian bourgeoisie. The motif of social leisure depicted in the piece would come to define Renoir's subsequent work.

== Other work ==
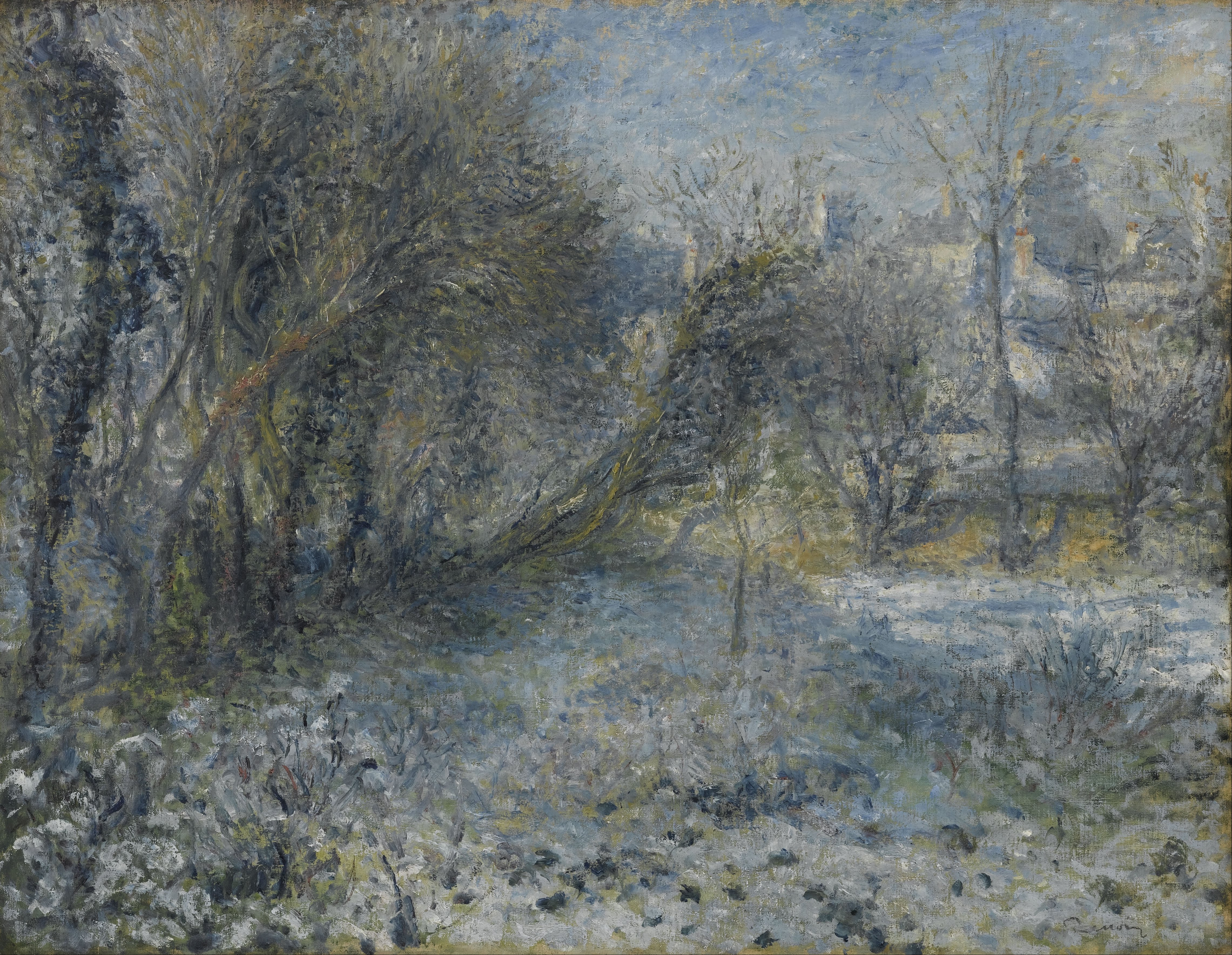
Snowy Landscape (1870–1875), Musée de l'Orangerie, Paris

There are at least four known snowscapes by Renoir: Skaters in the Bois de Boulogne (1868); Winter Landscape (1868); Snowy Landscape (1870–1875); and another work also titled Snowy Landscape (1875). (Note: As cited in Renoir: Paintings and drawings at the Art Institute of Chicago, paragraph 2, footnote 2: "The four known winter scenes are Skaters in the Bois de Boulogne (1868; Collection of William I. Koch [Dauberville 110]); Winter Landscape (1868; sold, Christie's, New York, Nov. 10, 1987, lot 4 [Dauberville 172]); Snowy Landscape (c. 1875; Musée National de l'Orangerie, Paris [Dauberville 177]); and Snowy Landscape (1875; sold, Sotheby's, London, Feb. 6, 2008, lot 326).") Along with Skaters in the Bois de Boulogne, Renoir would return to the imagery of the Bois de Boulogne years later with a large painting called The Morning Ride (1873), alternatively titled Madame Henriette Darras, which was rejected by the Salon in that year.

== Provenance ==
The piece is currently held in the private art collection of William I. Koch, who lent the work for exhibition by the Museum of Fine Arts, Boston in 2005. Previous owners include:

- Ambroise Vollard
- Robert von Hirsch
- Spencer Compton, 7th Marquess of Northampton
- Richard L. Feigen & Co.

== See also ==
- List of paintings by Pierre-Auguste Renoir
