= The Grands Boulevards =

1875 painting by Pierre-Auguste Renoir

- Les Grands Boulevards (French)
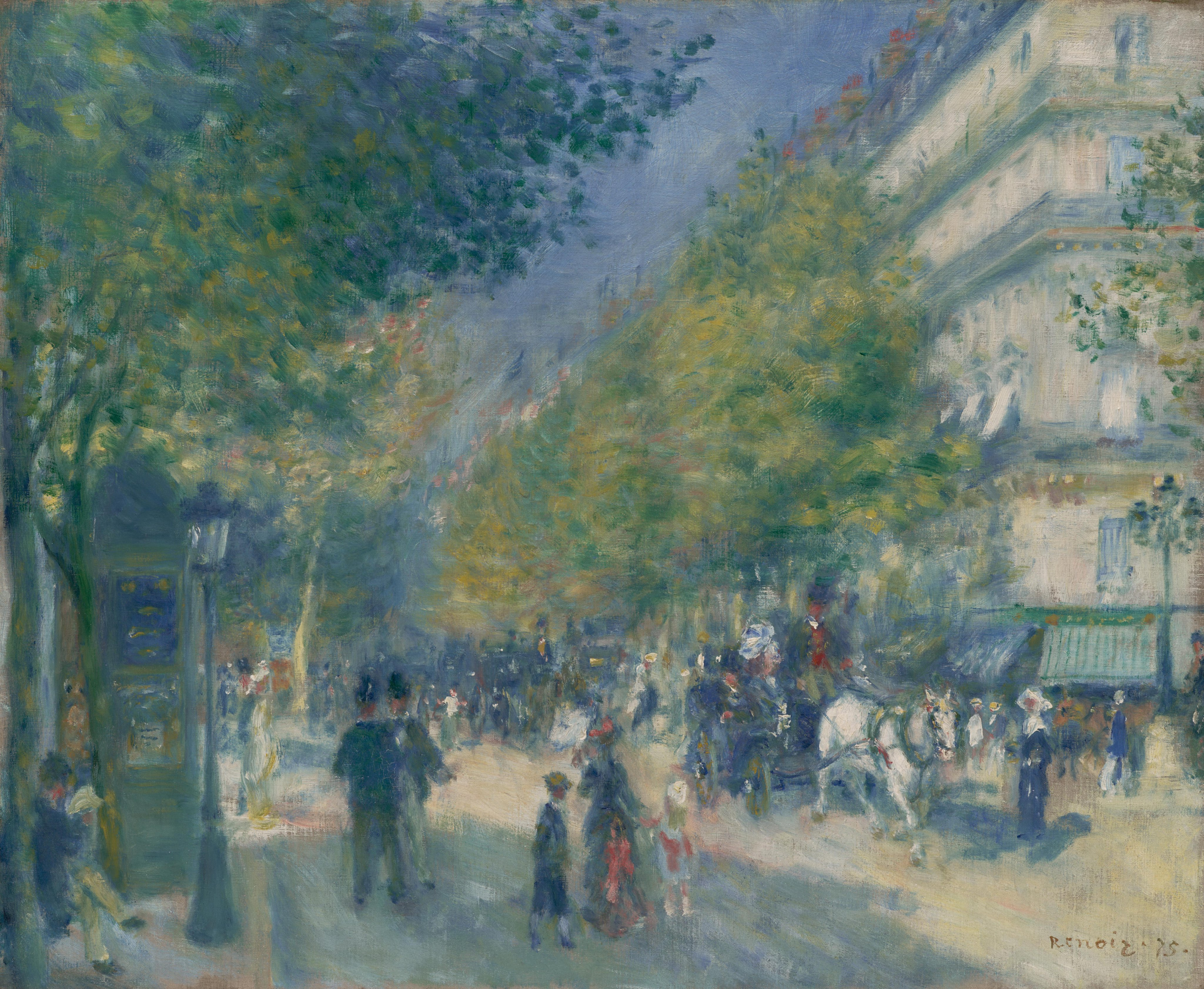
- Artist: Pierre-Auguste Renoir
- Year: 1875
- Medium: Oil on canvas
- Dimensions: 52.1 cm × 63.5 cm (20.5 in × 25.0 in)
- Location: Philadelphia Museum of Art

The Grands Boulevards (French: Les Grands Boulevards) is an oil on canvas painting by Pierre-Auguste Renoir, painted in 1875. The painting illustrates a busy Paris boulevard, showing the effects of industrialisation and Haussmannisation. The image is housed at the Philadelphia Museum of Art. It is considered Renoir's most famous view of Paris.

== Background ==
Many of the great Impressionists were inspired by the vibrant, urban scenes of Paris. In the 1850s and 1860s, Paris was transformed into a modern metropolis by the urban planner, Georges-Eugène Haussmann. His massive urban renewal of the city resulted in a new layout dominated by wide boulevards, lined with uniform stone buildings, and open park spaces, which is still evident today. Renoir's painting The Grands Boulevards depicts one of the city's newest and most fashionable districts, where middle-class Parisian society would stroll at leisure.

Renoir moved to Paris at the age of four, when his family moved there from the town of Limoges. He spent a large part of his life living there and loved the city dearly, stating, "In the streets of Paris I felt at home."

== Description ==
Renoir's The Grands Boulevards illustrates Haussman's renovation of Paris by depicting the wide, paved street and the large concrete building to the right of the painting. The boulevard is teeming with life; not only does the painting illustrate all classes, but it emphasises the flâneurs. Renoir's emphasis moves away from the human figure and towards the lighting's effect on the image. The painting shows the clothes worn by the people on the boulevard in detail, from which their social class can be inferred, but their individuality is hidden because Renoir chooses not to show any details of their faces. Instead, his focus is on the effect of sunshine on the buildings and trees. The painting shows great detail in the shadows created by the sun shining on the trees, the shadows created by the people, and the shadow of the horse-drawn carriage. Throughout the painting it is evident that Renoir was influenced by Impressionism. The characteristics of Impressionism that can be seen in Renoir's work are short brush strokes and a seemingly out of focus view.

== See also ==
- List of paintings by Pierre-Auguste Renoir
