= Woman Playing a Guitar =

1897 painting by Pierre-Auguste Renoir

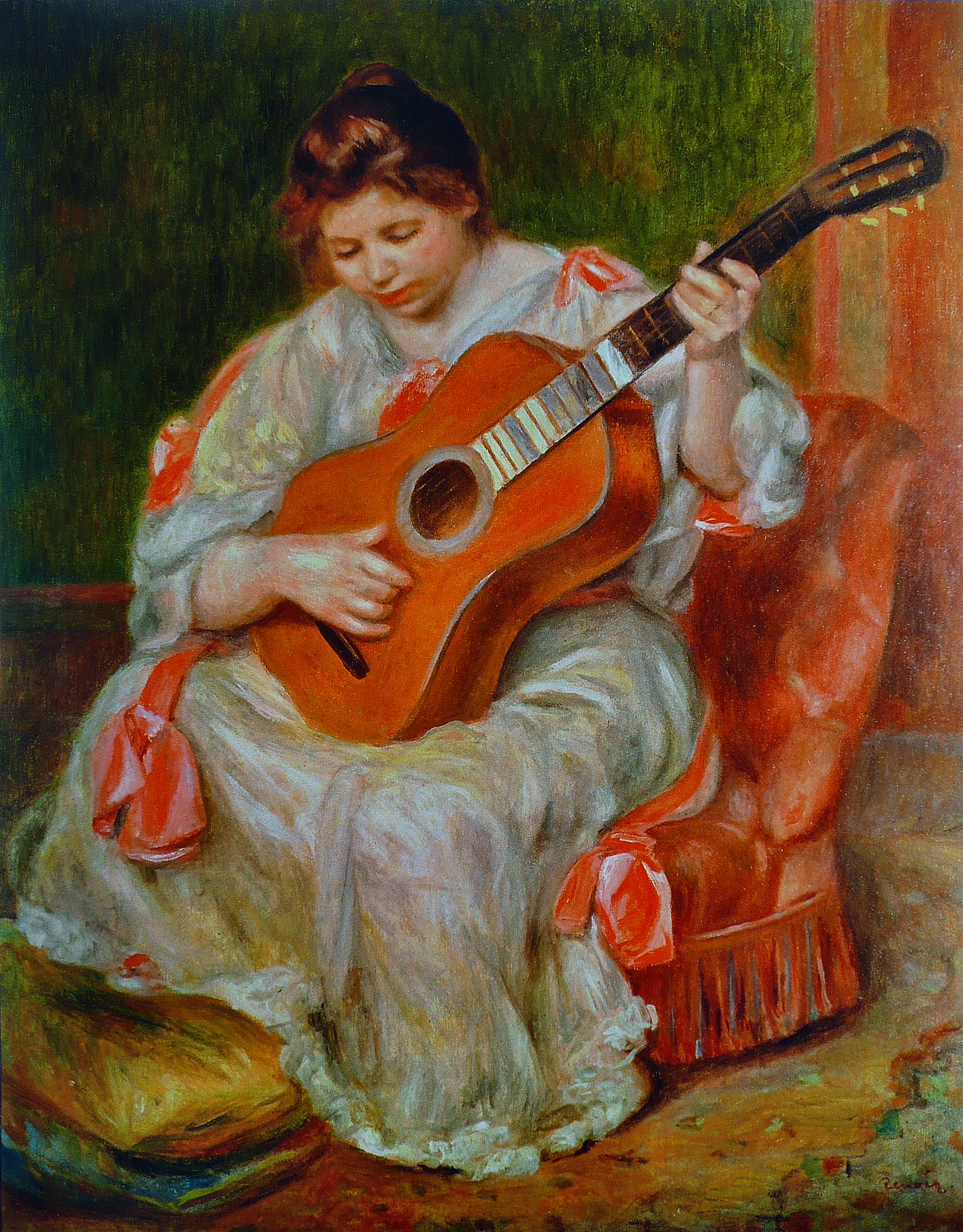
- Artist: Pierre-Auguste Renoir
- Year: 1897
- Medium: oil on canvas
- Dimensions: 81 cm × 65 cm (32 in × 26 in)
- Location: Musée des Beaux-Arts, Lyon

Woman Playing a Guitar (French – Femme jouant de la guitare, Joueuse de guitare ou La Guitariste) is an 1897 painting by Pierre-Auguste Renoir representing his late work period (1892–1919). It is now in the Museum of Fine Arts of Lyon, which bought it in 1901.

Renoir painted several paintings of guitar-players and borrowing classical motifs – here, he is influenced by Camille Corot, Titian and Rubens. The work was one of the first paintings acquired by Paul Durand-Ruel.

== See also ==
- List of paintings by Pierre-Auguste Renoir
