= After the Bath (Renoir) =

Painting by Pierre-Auguste Renoir

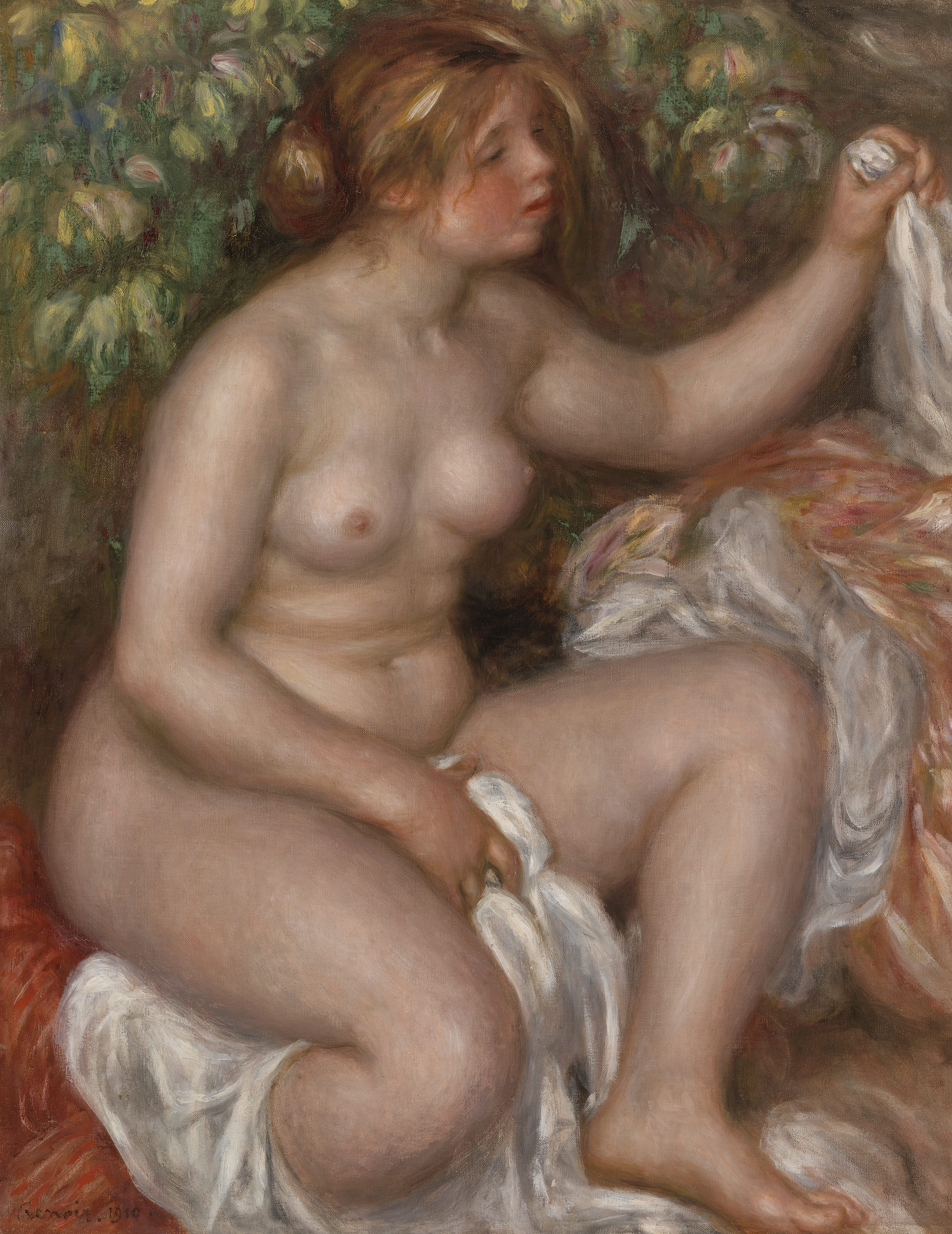
- Artist: Pierre-Auguste Renoir
- Year: 1910
- Medium: Oil on canvas
- Dimensions: 94.5 cm × 75.2 cm (37 3/16 in × 29 5/8 in)
- Location: Barnes Foundation, Philadelphia

After the Bath (French: La sortie du bain, lit. 'Getting out of the bath') is a painting from 1910 by the French painter Pierre-Auguste Renoir representing his late work period (1892–1919). The painting is now in the Barnes Foundation in Philadelphia.

== Provenance ==
The painting was purchased from the artist in Paris, by Paul Durand-Ruel in October 1910. On December 18, 1915, Albert C. Barnes (the founder of the institution) purchased it from the latter.

== See also ==
- List of paintings by Pierre-Auguste Renoir
- 1910 in art
