= Young Woman with a Blue Ribbon =

Painting by Pierre-Auguste Renoir

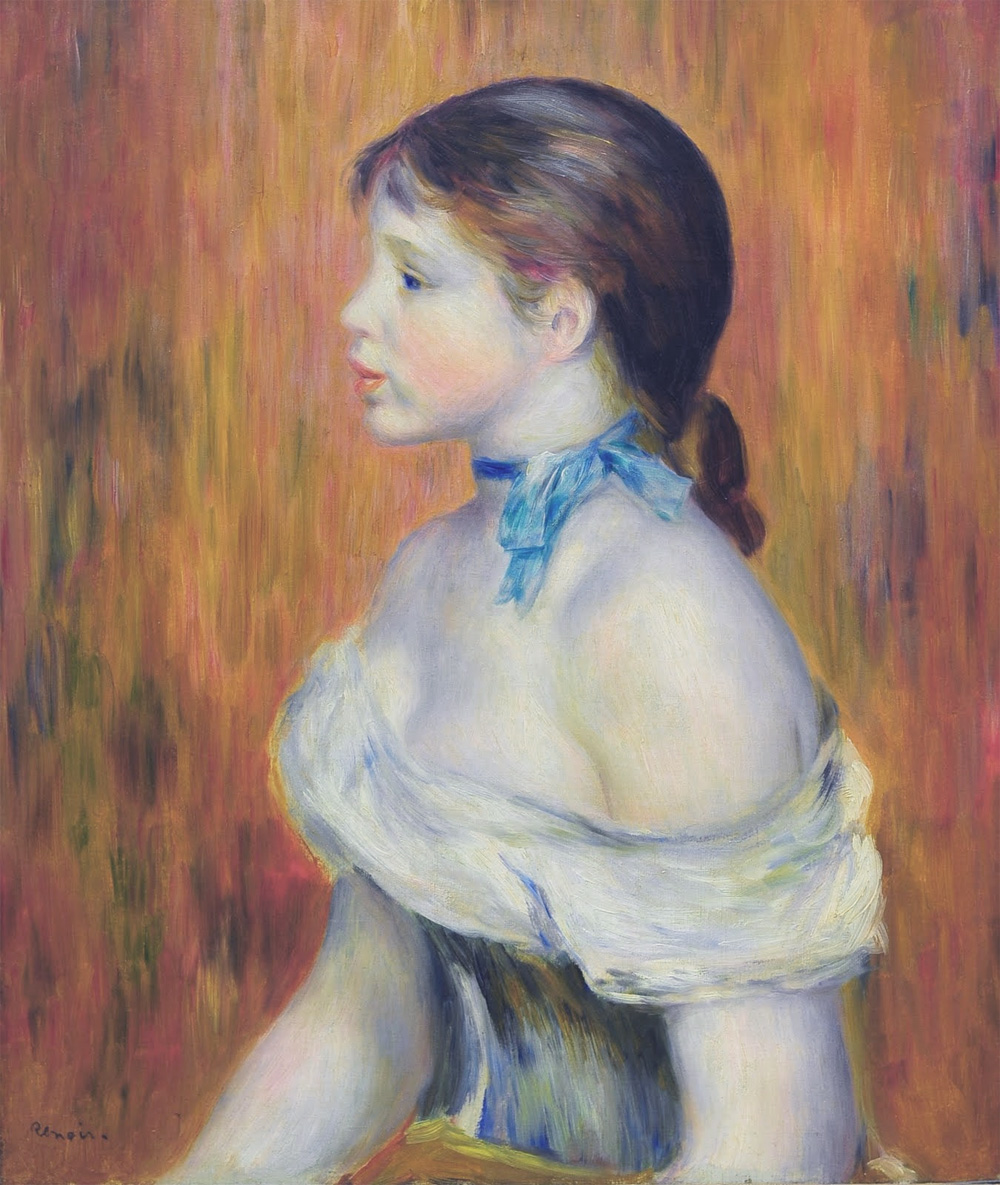
- Artist: Pierre-Auguste Renoir
- Year: 1888
- Medium: Oil on canvas
- Dimensions: 55 cm × 46 cm (22 in × 18 in)
- Location: Museum of Fine Arts of Lyon

Young Woman with a Blue Ribbon is an 1888 oil on canvas painting by Pierre-Auguste Renoir, now in the Museum of Fine Arts of Lyon. The name of the model is unknown but she can also be seen in other Renoir works such as the young woman splashing the others in Les Grandes Baigneuses (Renoir, 1887).

The painting itself represented a return by Renoir to a gentler, more delicate style after his years of experimenting with Impressionism. As he himself said at the time in a letter to the art dealer Paul Durand-Ruel "I have taken up again, never to abandon it, my old style, soft and light of touch. This is to give you some idea of my new and final manner of painting".

== See also ==
- List of paintings by Pierre-Auguste Renoir
