= Flowers in a Vase =

Painting by Jan Brueghel I

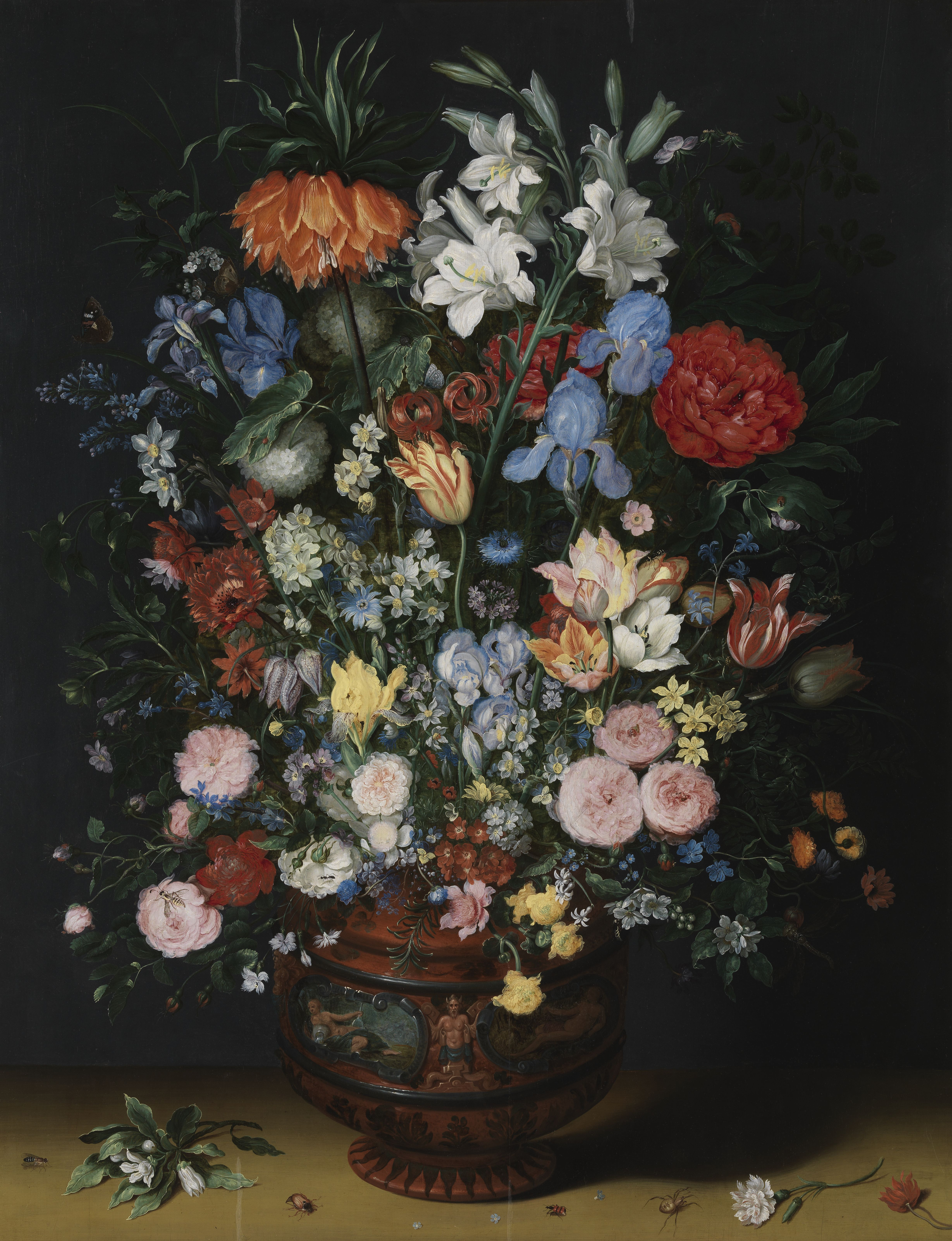
Flowers in a Vase (c. 1620) by Jan Brueghel the Elder

Flowers in a Vase is a 17th-century painting, usually attributed to Jan Brueghel the Elder but sometimes argued to be a collaboration between him and his son Jan Brueghel the Younger. It was probably painted around 1620, before the son's trip to Italy. It is now in the Royal Museum of Fine Arts, Antwerp as catalogue number 643.
