= Girls at the Piano =

Painting by Pierre-Auguste Renoir

Jeunes filles au piano
- Young Girls at the Piano (English)
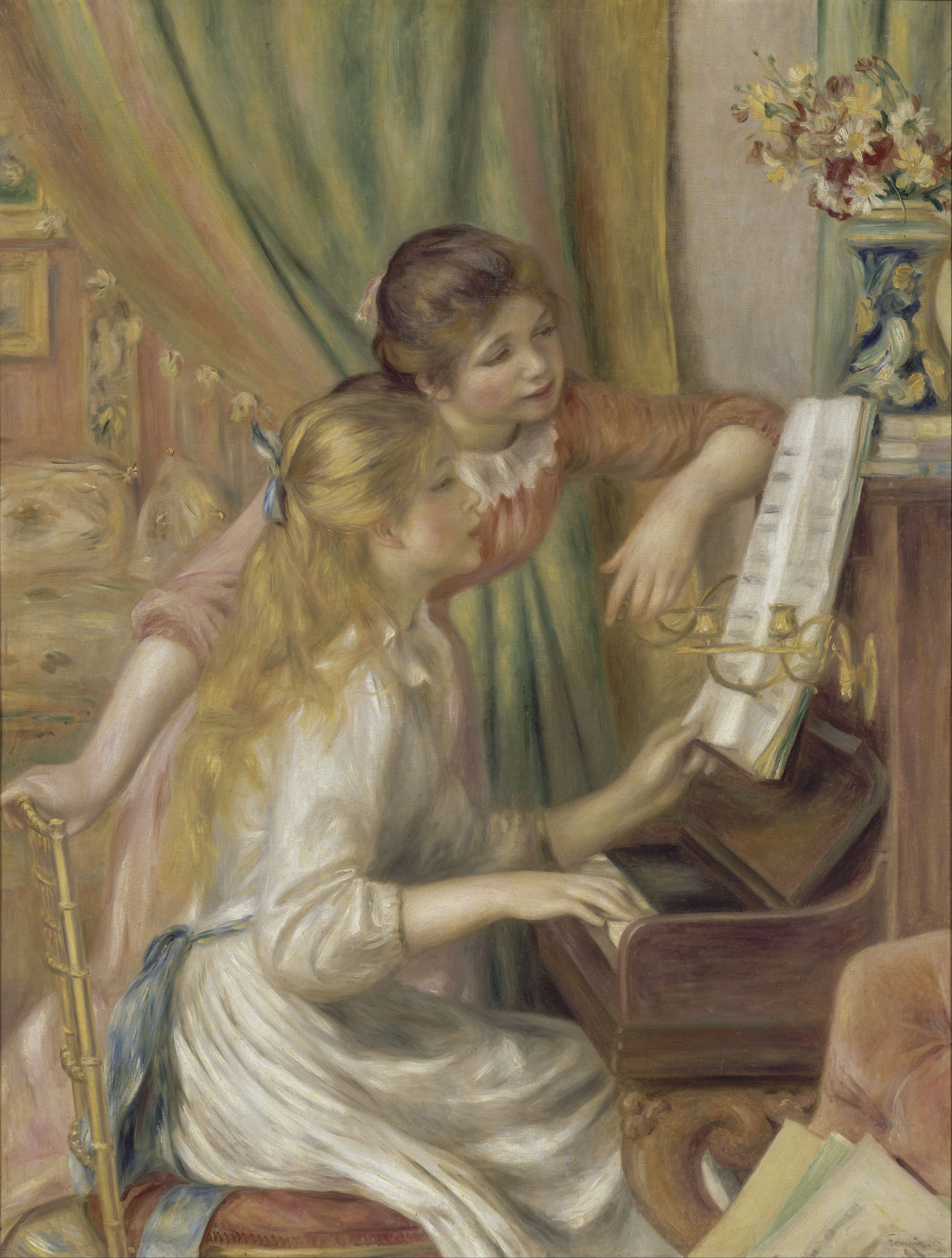
- Artist: Pierre-Auguste Renoir
- Year: 1892
- Medium: Oil on canvas
- Dimensions: 116 cm × 90 cm (46 in × 35 in)
- Location: Musée d'Orsay; Paris

Young Girls at the Piano (French: Jeunes filles au piano) is an oil-on-canvas painting by French artist Pierre-Auguste Renoir, a leading painter in the development of the Impressionist style. The painting represents his late work period (1892–1919). It was completed in 1892 as an informal commission for the Musée du Luxembourg. Renoir painted three other variations of this composition in oil and two sketches, one in oil and one in pastel. Known by the artist as repetitions, they were executed to fulfill commissions from dealers and collectors. The work is on public display at the Musée d'Orsay in Paris, Metropolitan Museum of Art in New York, and the Musée de l'Orangerie in Paris.

== Description ==
Renoir depicts two young girls at a piano in a bourgeois home, one in a white dress with blue sash seated playing and one in a pink dress standing. Renoir completed three additional versions of this composition in oil for collectors; the Luxembourg version is now housed at the Musée d'Orsay in Paris, the Robert Lehman Collection version is at the Metropolitan Museum of Art in New York, while the Caillebotte version and one other are in private collections. An oil sketch of the composition is on display at the Musée de l'Orangerie in Paris and a pastel sketch is in a private collection. The painting in the Musée d'Orsay is 116 cm high and 90 cm wide. The version at the Met is 111.8 x 86.4 cm. The oil sketch at the Musée de l'Orangerie is 116.0 x 81.0 cm.

Pissarro and Monet routinely painted series of variations on a single theme, but their works were intended to be shown together to chronicle the effects of light and atmosphere, while Renoir's repetitions were independent essays in composition. In particular, details and poses changed subtly, and the sketches eliminate most of the background elements.

Renoir explored a similar composition with his earlier 1888 work The Daughters of Catulle Mendès, now in the Annenberg Collection at the Metropolitan Museum of Art.

== See also ==
- List of paintings by Pierre-Auguste Renoir
