= The Braid =

Painting by Pierre-Auguste Renoir

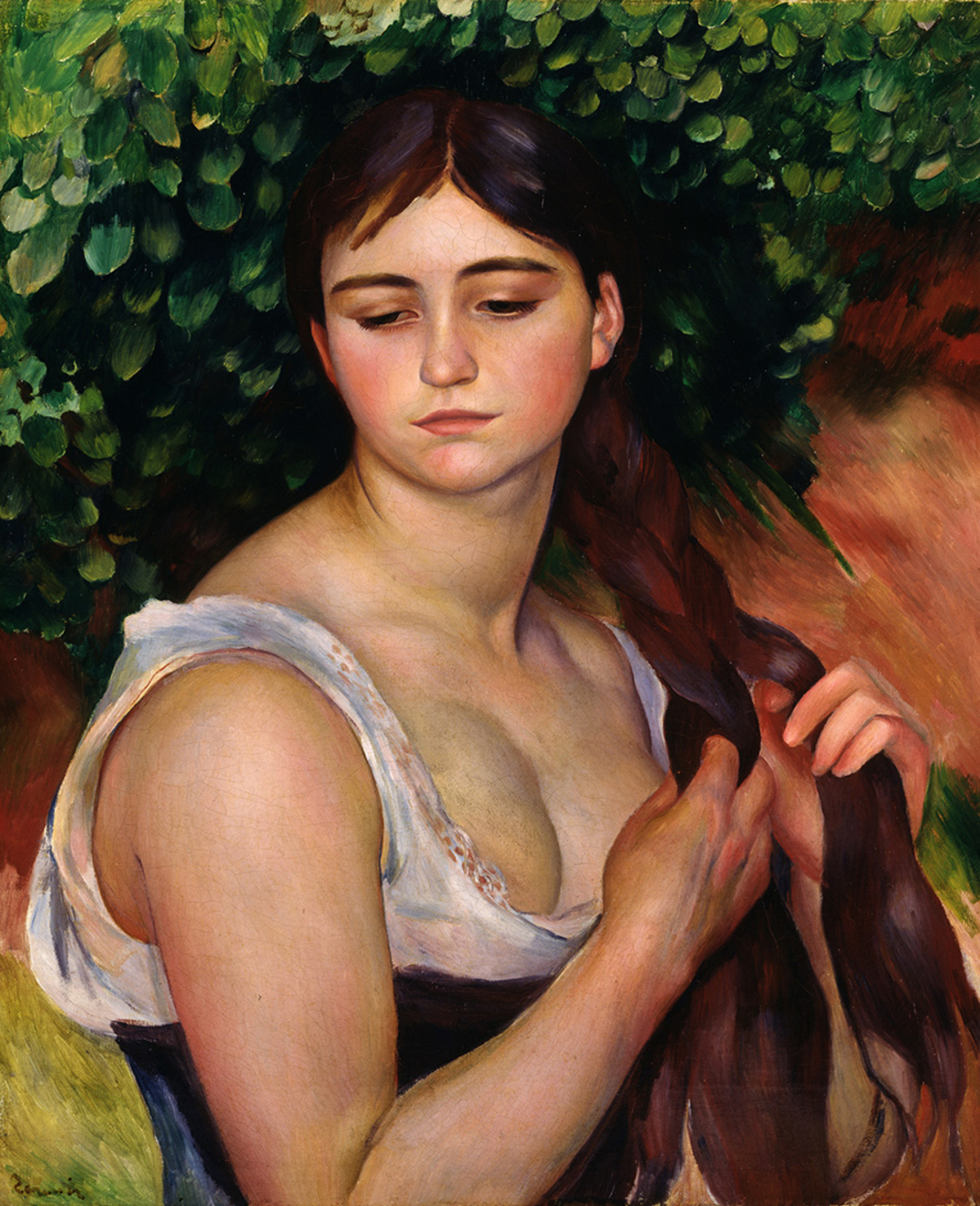
- Artist: Pierre-Auguste Renoir
- Year: 1886–1887
- Medium: Oil on canvas
- Dimensions: 57 cm × 47 cm (22 in × 19 in)
- Location: Museum Langmatt; Baden, Switzerland

The Braid, also known as Femme se coiffant, La Natte, or Girl Braiding Her Hair, is an oil-on-canvas painting by the French artist Pierre-Auguste Renoir, created between 1886 and 1887 during his so-called dry or Ingres period.

Renoir traveled to Italy in 1881, where he viewed the masterpieces of Raphael. He returned home, and by 1883, he began to think he had "exhausted Impressionism". He started to use more detailed brushstrokes and pursued structure in his overall work, breaking with his previous style and returning to the Neoclassicism of painter Jean-Auguste-Dominique Ingres.

French painter Suzanne Valadon was the model for the woman in the painting, but her appearance was changed by Renoir to appear Italian. Valadon was a model for many of Renoir's works, including Dance in the City (1883), Dance at Bougival (1883), Portrait of Suzanne Valadon (1885), and Suzanne Valadon (1885). The painting is held by the Museum Langmatt.

== See also ==
- List of paintings by Pierre-Auguste Renoir
