= Blonde Bather =

Two paintings (1881, 1882) by Auguste Renoir

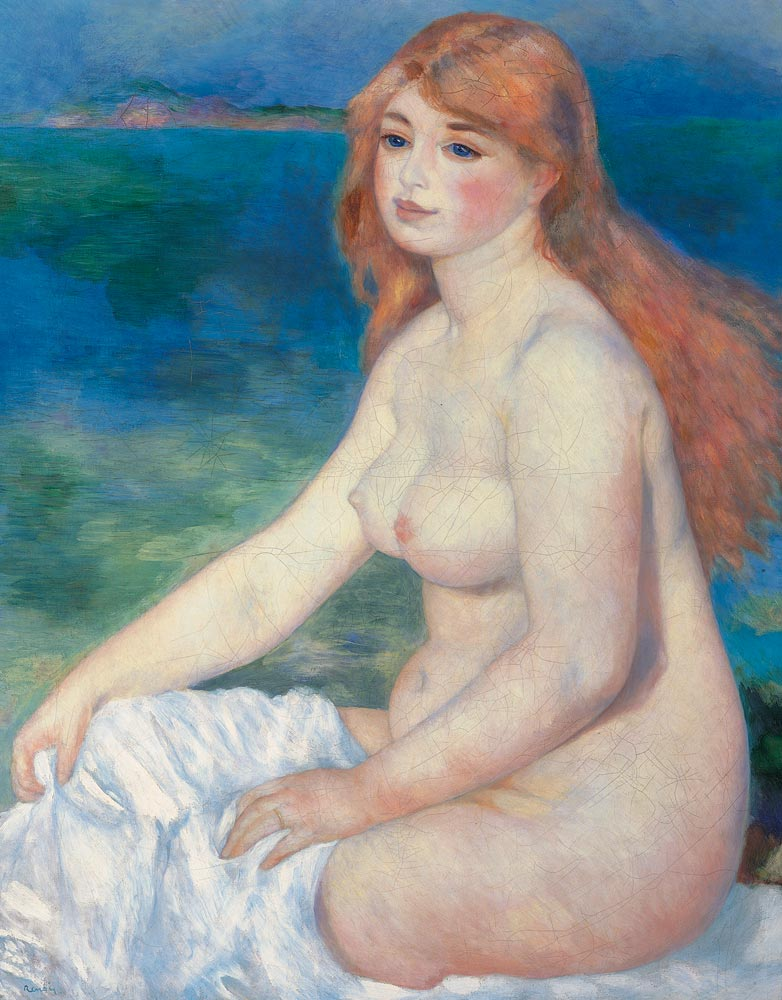
- Artist: Pierre-Auguste Renoir
- Year: 1882
- Medium: oil on canvas
- Dimensions: 90 cm × 63 cm (35 in × 25 in)
- Location: Pinacoteca Giovanni e Marella Agnelli; Turin, Italia

Blonde Bather (La baigneuse blonde) is the name of two very similar paintings by French painter Pierre-Auguste Renoir, created in 1881 and 1882. The model was Aline Charigot, later to become Renoir's wife. Influenced by Renaissance painting (particularly Raphael's frescoes) that Renoir saw in Italy in 1881, both paintings show a marked change of style from Renoir's previous work. Some commentators consider these are works of great beauty while others find them vulgar. There has been criticism of the conservation work performed on the 1881 painting.

== Context ==
Renoir was forty and an established artist when he visited Italy in autumn 1881. Apart from a visit to Algiers earlier in the year, he had not been outside metropolitan France and indeed he had never been far from Paris. Ambroise Vollard, who collected his art, reported that Renoir particularly admired the works he saw by Titian and Raphael (including Madonna della seggiola and The Expulsion of Heliodorus from the Temple) as well as Pompeiian and Egyptian frescoes. More practically, in letters home Renoir wrote that he appreciated the beautiful scenery and light, and he hoped to complete many paintings which would attract good prices. He had become dissatisfied with his figure painting (which lived awkwardly beside his impressionist landscapes) and he was pleased to leave Paris where he felt obliged to do society portraits. His visit was very productive and he shipped back to Paris several crates of paintings.

The model for Blonde Bather was his girlfriend, favourite model, and future wife Aline Charigot who was with him for part of his trip. Charigot had earlier in 1881 been included in Renoir's Le déjeuner des canotiers (Luncheon of the Boating Party) where she is the woman with the little dog, on the left. She appeared in many of his paintings – in 1882 Danse à la campagne (Dance in the Country). (Note: Charigot was born in Essoyes in 1859 and died in 1915. The couple had three sons: Pierre (born 1885), Jean (born 1894) and Claude (born 1901).)

== Blonde Bather (1881) ==
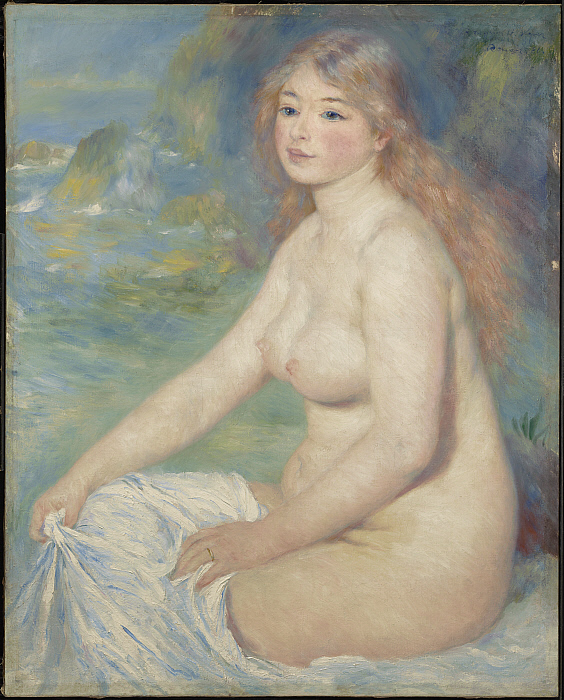
Blonde Bather (1881), Sterling and Francine Clark Art Institute

=== Description (1881) ===
The painting, now in the Sterling and Francine Clark Art Institute ("The Clark") in Williamstown, Massachusetts, is an oil on canvas measuring 81.6 by 65.4 centimetres (32.1 in × 25.7 in). Renoir explained that the picture was painted on board a boat in the Bay of Naples. On his return to Paris Renoir sold or gave the painting to Henri Vever, a modern art collector, and signed the canvas adding a dedication to Vever.

Despite Renoir's claim, the scene is not as from a boat. Renoir altered the background after the original painting had been done, and the figure appears to be seated beside the shore – behind her back is grass.

In 1926 the American art collector Sterling Clark purchased the painting after some uncertainty. His wife Francine thought the work was a marvel; Clark thought that he had never seen finer painting in terms of colour but it might become difficult to live with. He felt the price was excessive at $100,000 thinking it would only fetch $60,000 at auction. Barbara White describes the appearance of the model as "rotund".

=== Assessments of 1881 version ===
Renoir's biographer Barbara White said that 1881 marks a significant change of style for Renoir's nudes – a new style he was to perpetuate – "A new classical impressionism inspired by the Italian frescoes ... a formal timeless view of a sober and sensuous figure". Renoir's friends in Paris also regarded it as a distinct change of style – the figure's contours are soft and, apart from the wedding ring, there are no signs of modernity. Renoir wrote "So, by studying out of doors I have ended up by seeing only the broad harmonies without any longer preoccupying myself with the small details that dim the sunlight rather than illuminating it." He had been influenced by Raphael's frescoes at Villa Farnesina such as Triumph of Galatea and so, writing from Rome, he said he had come to admire grandeur and simplicity. According to White he achieved these qualities for the first time in this painting. The Clark art gallery says the painting "gives the nude a monumental presence that suggests a timeless image of womanhood".

=== Conservation ===
Sterling Clark regarded Renoir as one of the greatest painters and he considered that his very best work was done around 1881. Clark was antipathetic to art restoration – in his will he prohibited any restoration of his bequests. On his death in 1956 most of his Renoirs were pictured in Life in probably a completely unrestored condition. On the occasion of a 2012 Royal Academy exhibition From Paris a Taste for Impressionism Michael Daley took the opportunity to compare the Life photographs, one taken of Blonde Bather in 1996, and one in the exhibition catalogue, which show progressively that the contrast in the background has weakened and a halo effect has appeared around the body. Daley considers this could not be due to photographic variation but rather that the painting (and the exhibited paintings generally) have been over-cleaned at least twice since 1956. Brian Sewell made the same point referring to The Clark paintings generally: "Many of the paintings in the exhibition have been left a little raw by their conservators’ activities with Brillo pad and wire brush."

== Blonde Bather (1882) ==
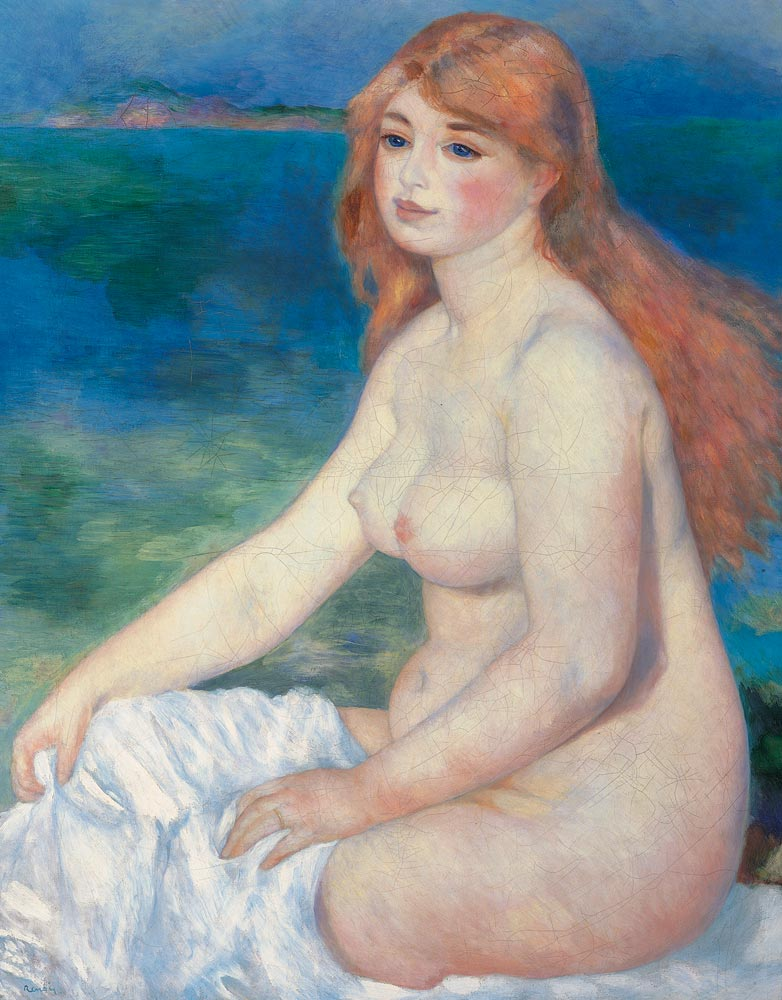
Blonde Bather (1882), Pinacoteca Giovanni e Marella Agnelli

=== Description (1882) ===
Back in Paris in spring 1882 Renoir painted a second version, 90 by 63 centimetres (35.4 in × 24.8 in), mainly distinguished from the original by brighter background colours and a line of cliffs apparent in the distance. (Note: In 1969 White referred to this version as "Blond Bather with Brown Eyes".) It is now owned by Pinacoteca Giovanni e Marella Agnelli (Giovanni and Marella Agnelli Gallery) in Turin and is on public display. It was undertaken at his dealer Paul Durand-Ruel's request – he had already found a purchaser.

After returning from a working holiday in Spain with his young family in 1933, Kenneth Clark, (Note: Sterling Clark and Kenneth Clark were not related.) later to become the famous British art historian, wrote to his mentor Bernard Berenson: "We are consoled by the purchase of two small Renoirs which would make Mary sick but to me are exquisitely lovely." (Note: Mary was Bernard Berenson's wife.) These were the 1882 Blonde Bather and the Femme en Blouse Blanche of 1907. Once back home, Marcus Leith photographed Clark standing nonchalantly in front of his newly acquired prize and much later the photograph itself became a famous image of the patrician Lord Clark. Blonde Bather remained one of his favourite paintings but Clark always worried about becoming impoverished so in 1959 he sold it for £120,000.

=== Assessments of 1882 version ===
Edward Lucie-Smith wrote of Kenneth Clark in 2014: "He also once owned ... a large icing-sugar sweet Renoir nude from the early 1880s, now in the Pinacoteca Agnelli in Turin. This flamboyantly vulgar object would undoubtedly excite new-rich billionaire collectors if it appeared today in a Sotheby's or Christie's auction". Clark’s protégé Victor Pasmore said the Renoir nude "set his teeth on edge" and he painted a parody of it which Clark willingly purchased. On the other hand, Dallas Museum of Art calls the 1882 version "This superb second painting".

== Chalk study (1880–1881) ==
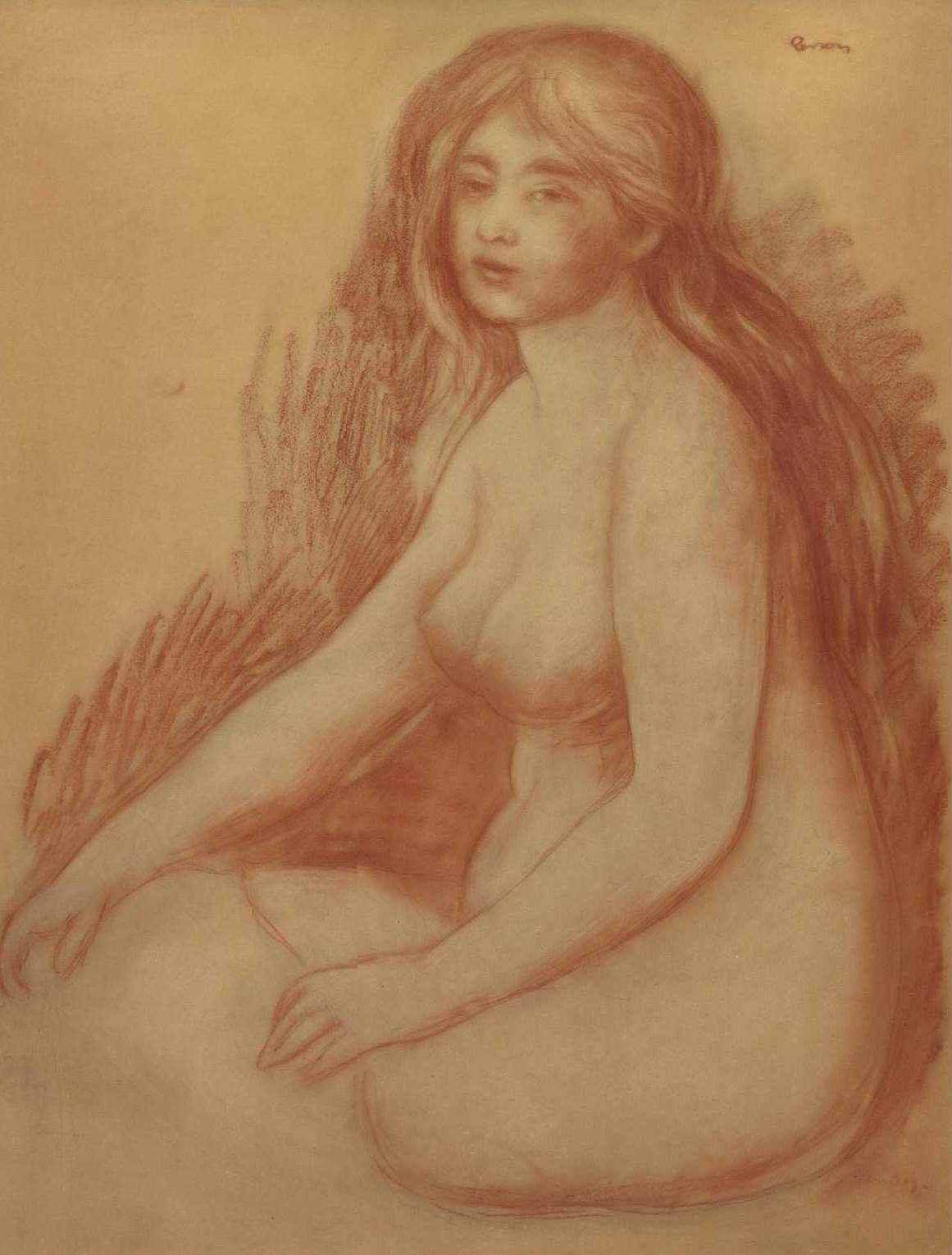
Chalk study (1880–81)

There exists a red chalk study 84.5 by 65.5 centimetres (33.3 in × 25.8 in) on wove tissue paper mounted on board, owned by the Dallas Museum of Art. The museum regards it as "among the most important surviving drawings by Renoir" and says it relates to the 1881 painting. It was first drawn in pencil and then developed in chalk. Renoir sold it to Ambroise Vollard, his art dealer. The drawing was probably made from life before commencing the 1881 oil painting but there is no sign that it was used to transfer an initial outline to the canvas.

Renoir also made an oil study, 16.1 by 11.4 centimetres (6.33 in × 4.5 in), for the 1881 painting.

== See also ==
- List of paintings by Pierre-Auguste Renoir
