= Gabrielle Renard =

Family member of Pierre-Auguste Renoir (1878–1959)

Gabrielle Renard and Jean Renoir, painted in 1895 by Pierre-Auguste Renoir

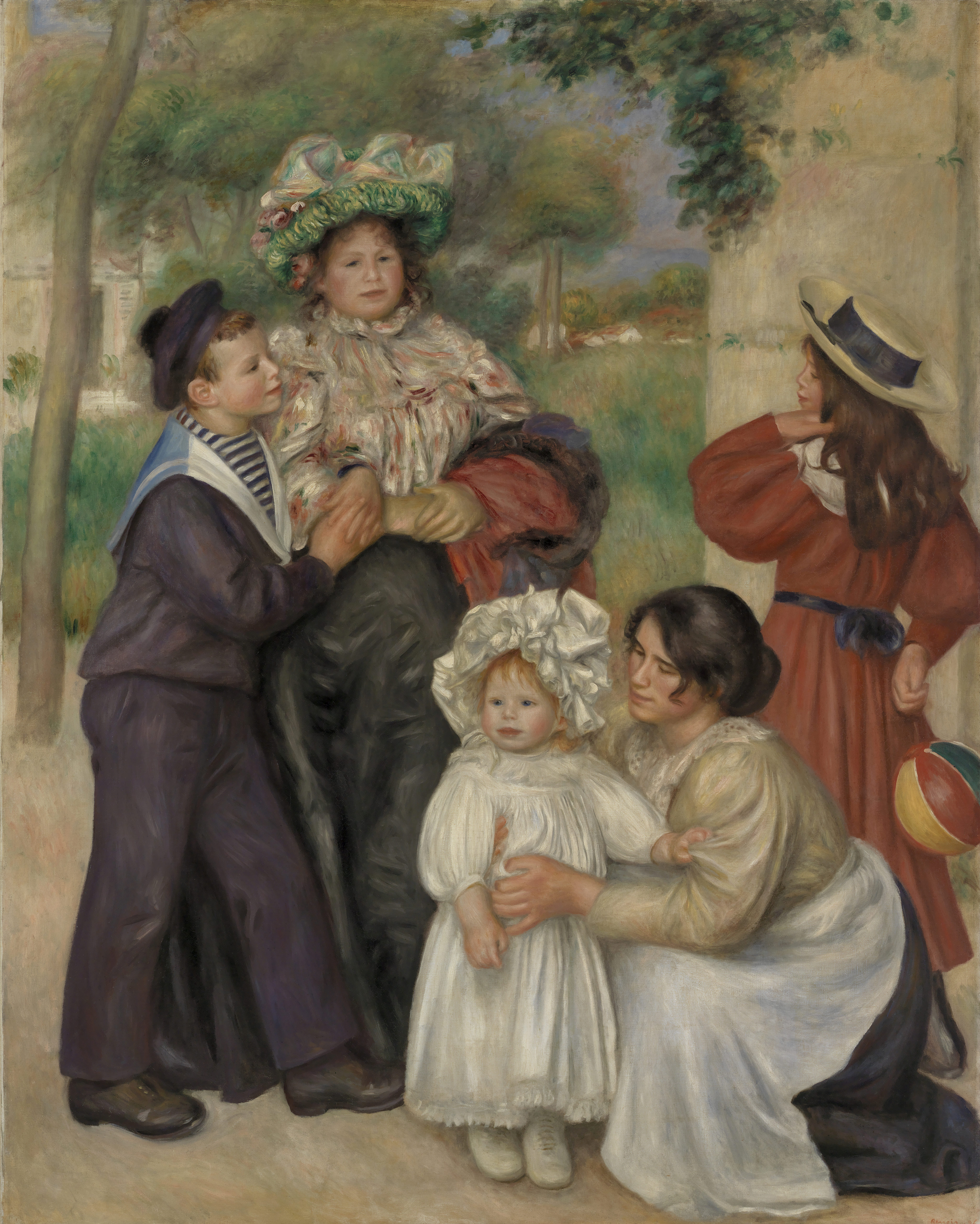
The Artist's Family, Pierre-Auguste Renoir, 1896.

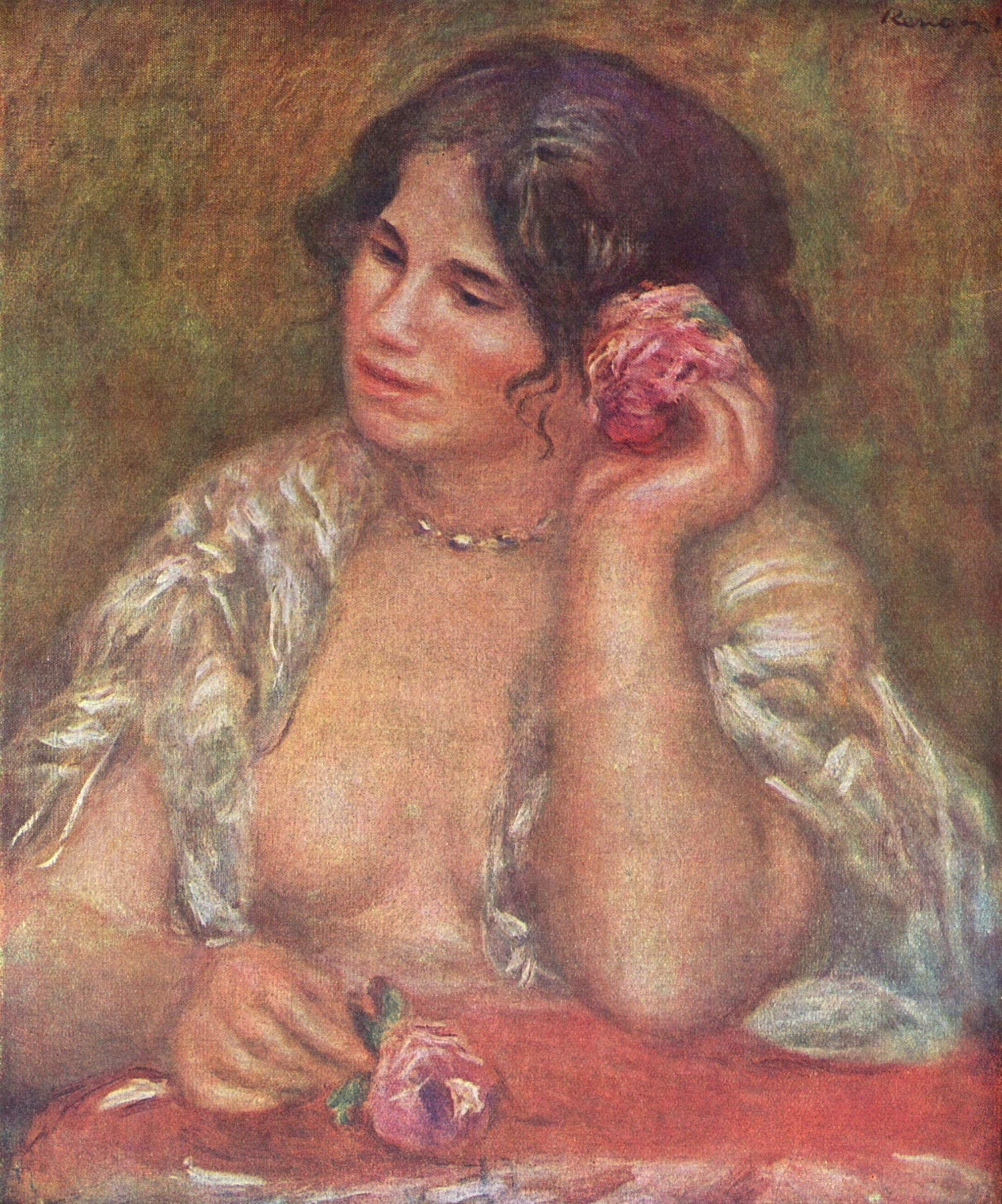
Gabrielle with Rose, Pierre-Auguste Renoir, 1911.

Gabrielle Renard (August 1, 1878 – February 26, 1959) was a French woman who became an important member of the family of the painter Pierre-Auguste Renoir, first becoming their nanny, and subsequently a frequent model for the artist. The bond she developed with the Renoirs' second son, the future filmmaker Jean Renoir, lasted throughout their lives. Upon her marriage in 1921, she became Gabrielle Renard-Slade.

== Early life ==
Born in Essoyes in the Aube departement of France, she was a cousin of Aline Victorine Charigot Renoir, who had married the painter, Pierre-Auguste. The village was the birthplace of Aline also. At age sixteen, Gabrielle Renard moved to Montmartre to live and work as a nanny in her cousin's household, where the second of the three Renoir sons was about to be born. Renard became the subject of a number of Renoir's portraits, many of her with the children.

== The Renoir family ==
Gabrielle Renard developed a strong bond with the infant, Jean Renoir, that would last throughout their lives. She introduced him to the Guignol puppet shows that were held in the Montmartre. Gabrielle was fascinated by the newly invented motion picture, and when Jean Renoir was only a few years old, she took him to see his first film. He became a renowned film maker.

During the final years of Pierre-Auguste Renoir's life he suffered from severe rheumatoid arthritis, but continued to paint with her help. When the family moved to a farm at Cagnes-sur-Mer near the Mediterranean coast, seeking a better climate for Renoir's arthritis, Gabrielle moved with them. While he worked in the studio at "Les Collettes", Gabrielle would place the paint brush between his crippled fingers.

== Marriage ==
Devoted to her cousin's family, Gabrielle Renard did not marry until 1921, when the Renoir children were grown. Her husband, Conrad Hensler Slade (1871–1955), was an aspiring painter from a wealthy American family. They had a son whom they named Jean Slade.

== The United States ==
Following the occupation of France by the Germans during World War II, Gabrielle and her family moved to the United States, her husband's native country. Jean Renoir also moved to the United States during the war. Being a successful film director, he settled in Hollywood, Los Angeles, California. When Gabrielle's husband died in 1955, she moved to Beverly Hills to be near Jean Renoir.

== Death ==
Gabrielle Renard-Slade died at her home in Beverly Hills in 1959. In his memoirs, My Life and My Films, Jean Renoir begins and ends his book with discussion of Gabrielle Renard, and, throughout the autobiography, he recounts the profound influence Gabrielle had upon his life. He wrote, "She taught me to see the face behind the mask and the fraud behind the flourishes", and he concluded with the words he said he had often spoken as a child, "Wait for me, Gabrielle".
