= Dance at Bougival =

Painting by Pierre-Auguste Renoir

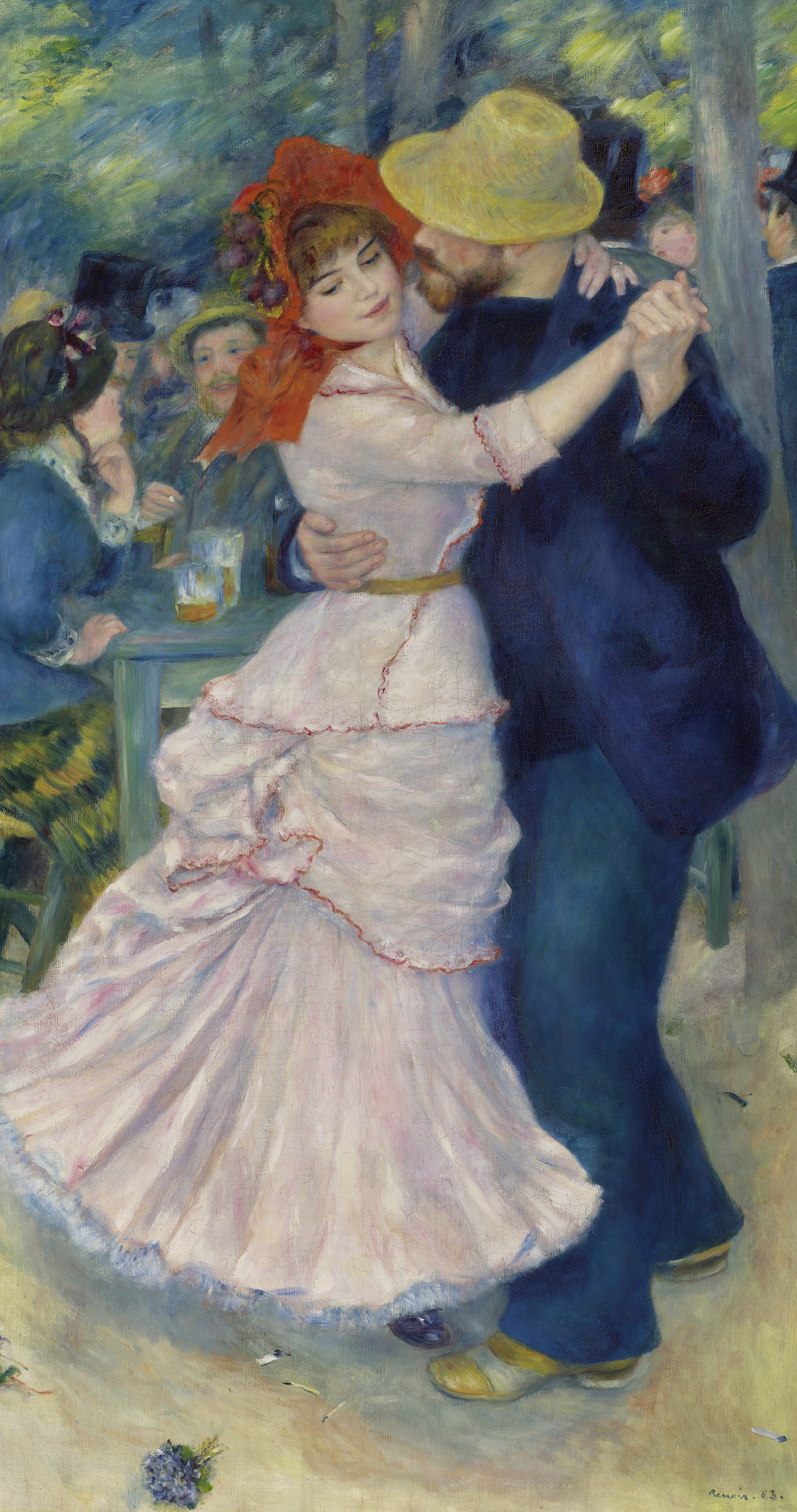
- Artist: Pierre-Auguste Renoir
- Year: 1883
- Type: Oil paint on canvas
- Dimensions: 181.9 by 98.1 centimetres (71.6 in × 38.6 in)
- Location: Museum of Fine Arts, Boston

Dance at Bougival (French: La danse à Bougival) is an 1883 oil-on-canvas painting by the French artist Pierre-Auguste Renoir, currently in the collection of the Museum of Fine Arts in Boston, Massachusetts, United States. Described as "one of the museum's most beloved works", it is one of three in a collection commissioned by Paul Durand-Ruel. It depicts a scene in the French village of Bougival, about 15 km from the center of Paris, a site utilized by many Impressionists besides Renoir including Claude Monet, Alfred Sisley, and Berthe Morisot.

The painting depicts two dancers surrounded by a lively scene of café goers. The painting's actual subjects are disputed, but it is well known for conveying the sense that they are in motion, making the viewer feel that they are actually there. Renoir used mostly pastel colors, but included a more vibrant hue in the hats of both the subjects. The larger group of paintings to which this one belongs is described as Renoir's last foray in Impressionism, and demonstrates the development of his artistic ability from his earlier works.

== The subjects ==
There is much discussion over who modeled the painting's figures, as well those in the other Dance paintings. The prevailing opinion is that it depicts two of Renoir's friends, Suzanne Valadon and Paul Lhote. Lhote is said to have appeared in Dance in the Country as well. However, Morgan Library and Museum director Colin Bailey believes the man may have been modeled by Hippolyte-Alphonse Fournaise, who appeared in Renoir's previous painting Luncheon of the Boating Party in front of his father's restaurant.

Valadon is more commonly agreed on as one of the models. Originally a trapeze artist, she became an artist's model after an injury ended her performing career; however, she is best remembered as a successful painter herself. Some historians believe Renoir's subject combines the features of Valadon and Renoir's wife, Aline Charigot. It is more generally accepted that Suzanne Valadon is the model in the Dance in the City, while Aline Charigot is the model in Dance in the Country. If this theory is true, the integration of the two models to form the woman in the Dance at Bougival ties the series together in a succinct way.

== Composition and style ==
The painting has had many names. Renoir first referred to it in 1883 as "La danse à la campagne." It is assumed to be a scene from the French village of Bougival, however, this fact is disputed due to a story written by Paul Lhote in which Renoir depicts an extremely similar scene, though the story takes place in Montmartre. Renoir spent the early part of his career in Italy, learning the classical tradition in art. While there, he became increasingly interested in the use of light to spotlight the humans in paintings. He experimented on various fruits and vegetables, then moved to painting bodies, using the light in the foreground and the darkness in the background to illuminate his subjects. Aspects of this approach can be seen in the Dance at Bougival. The figures in the painting are nearly life-size representations of the models, which, as Anne Distel writes, "reflect Renoir's periodic desire to produce ambitious works demonstrating his skill as a figure painter."

The painting has been described as one of Renoir's first reversions to a more classical style of painting he learned copying paintings in the Louvre while maintaining the bright palette of his fellow Impressionists. The Dance at Bougival was different from the other Dance paintings, in the respect that he did very little sketching and planning before applying the paint. The two people are depicted in pastel colors, with the deep blue suit of the man contrasting the pale pink dress on the woman. Additionally, the woman's hat is the same as the one worn by the woman in Dance in the Country, continuing Renoir's theme of tying together the paintings in an effort to create a unified group. It is said by many to be one of Renoir's last moments working with an Impressionist style. In his analysis of the painting, Colin Bailey writes "If these works may be said to bring Renoir's picturing of Parisian leisure to an end, their virtuosity and sureness of touch can be explained by his decade of immersion in the genre."

== The Dance paintings ==
Dance at Bougival is one of three paintings produced for the art dealer Paul Durand-Ruel. The three paintings are very similar to each other, each depicting a couple dancing in a different environment. The other pieces, Dance in the City and Dance in the Country, have similar pastel coloring and a whimsical aura. The paintings were all completed between January and April 1883, described by Colin B. Bailey as, "among the most productive three months in Renoir's career." These paintings combined Renoir's early stylistic endeavors, painting outside scenes, with his work on portraits that he developed while in Italy. Anne Distel writes that the titles of the paintings are not necessarily noteworthy and that their main purpose was to distinguish between the three paintings and the places where the dances were taking place. By doing so, the viewer can understand that Renoir is depicting the same dance as it occurs in three different parts of French society. There is a formal ball depicted in Dance in the City, a country dance in Dance in the Country, and a more informal outdoor event in Dance at Bougival.

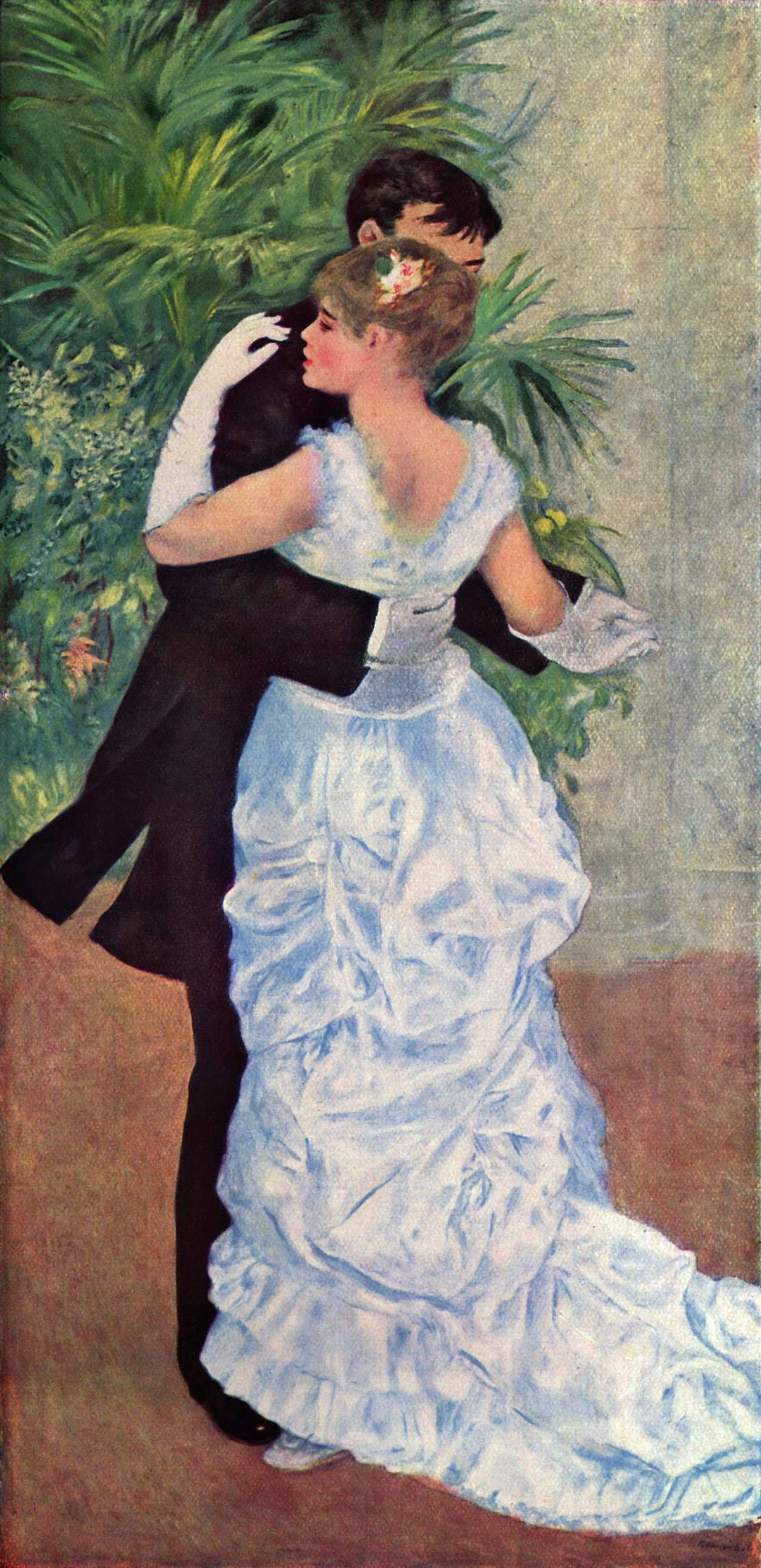
Dance in the City, 1883

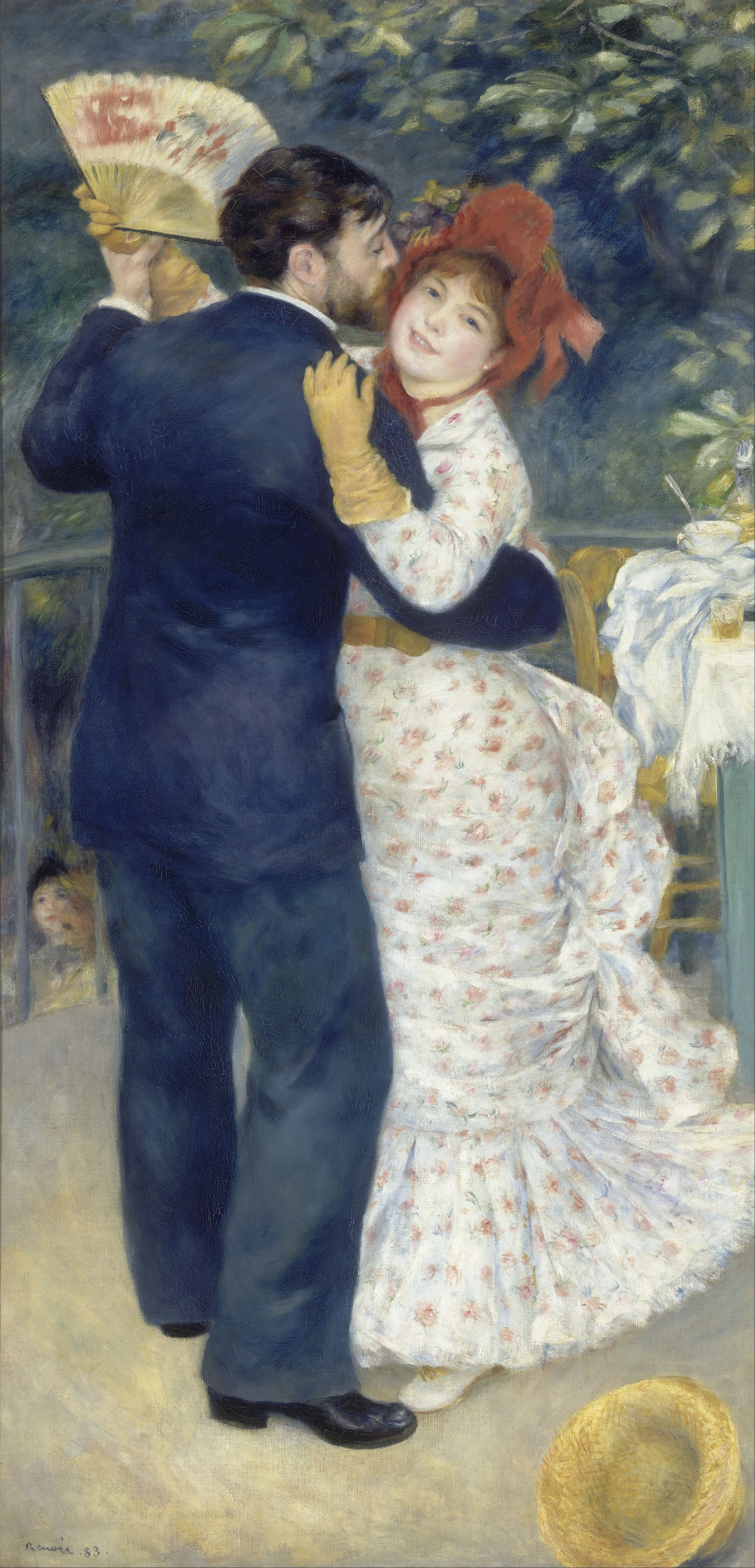
Dance in the Country, 1883

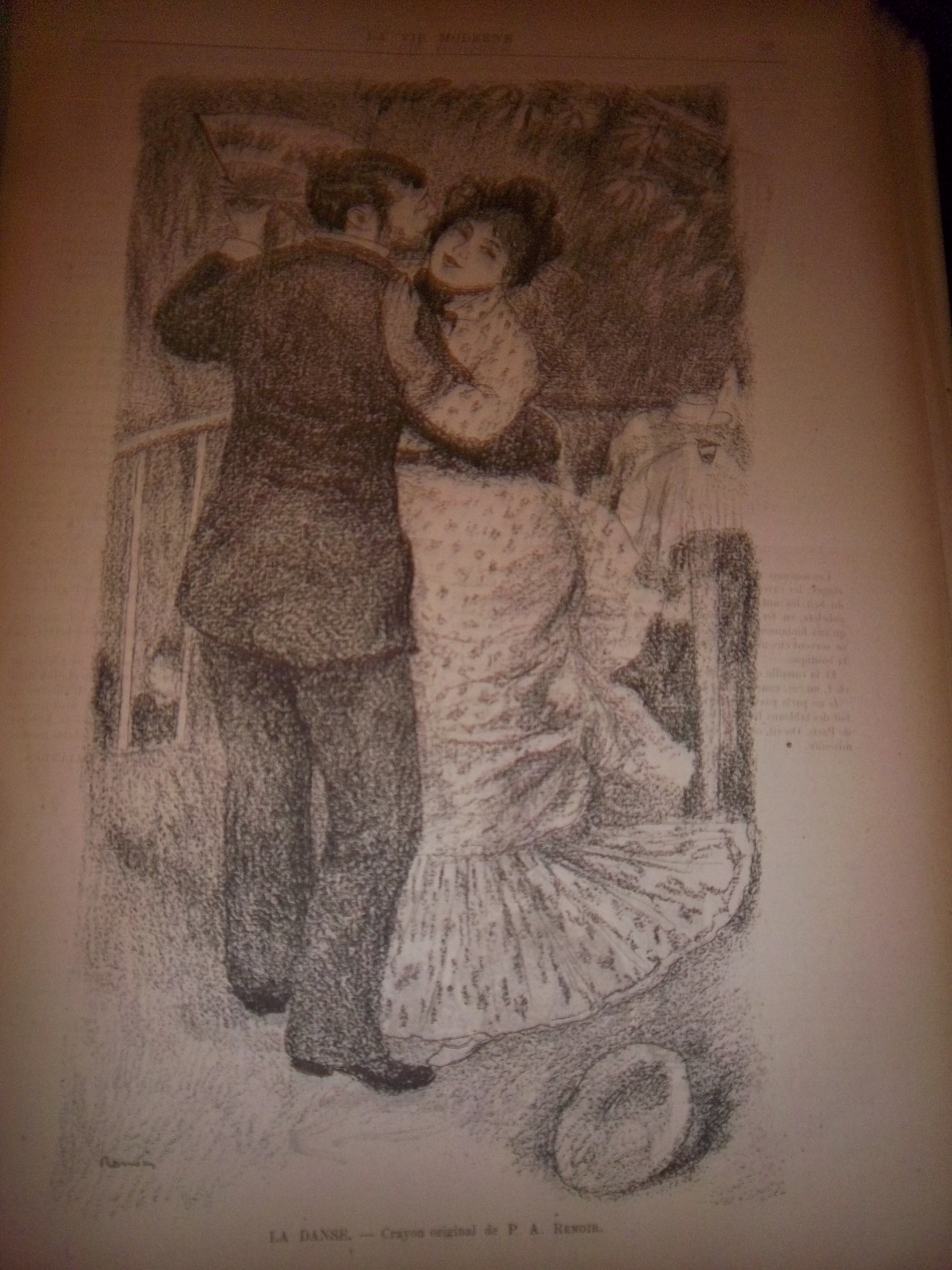
1884 La Vie Moderne - paper print, 1883

== Exhibitions ==
The painting was widely exhibited, first being shown in London soon after it was painted. At the opening of that show, for which the painting had not quite arrived in time, Colin Bailey notes, "The Academy, London's foremost art journal, lamented the absence of this 'great and audacious masterpiece.'" The painting traveled next to New York in the spring of 1886, where it was once again received with high praise. It was shown in Paris in 1892, then sold in 1894 to Félix François Depeaux who promised Paul Durand-Ruel at the time of the sale to eventually give them it to the Musée de Rouen, something that never happened due to Depeaux needing the money to finance a costly divorce.

== Ownership ==
- Paul Durand-Ruel
- 1894 sold to François Depeaux
- 1906 Edmond Decap (Depeaux's brother-in-law)
- Maurice Barret-Décap
- 1937, Barret-Décap sell it, by Anthony H. Manley, Paris to art dealer's Paul Brame (b. 1898 - d. 1971) and César Mange de Hauke, Paris, for Jacques Seligmann et Fils, Paris.
- 1937, transferred to New York and sold to the Boston Museum of Fine Arts

== X-Ray analysis ==
Analysis has been done on the painting in recent years in an effort to understand how Renoir created this work and where he might have changed his mind along the way. This analysis has shown that the original depiction of the woman in the painting was much different from what Renoir finally settled upon. Notably, she wore a different hat from the one in the final painting and looked much more similar to the woman in the Dance in the Country painting, said to have been modeled by Aline Charigot, Renoir's wife. In a letter Renoir wrote to the Bernheim brothers, he also said that "I had originally painted my dancer with a white jacket. I changed my mind and painted it blue. I should have waited a month before making this change." The analysis of these changes made by Renoir would not be possible without technological advancements that allow art historians to better understand the context in which artists worked. It is interesting to note the apparent change in model, and Renoir's regret at changing the color of the jacket provide further evidence for the fact that Renoir did not spend a significant amount of time planning for this work.

== See also ==
- List of paintings by Pierre-Auguste Renoir
