= Dance in the City =

Painting by Pierre-Auguste Renoir

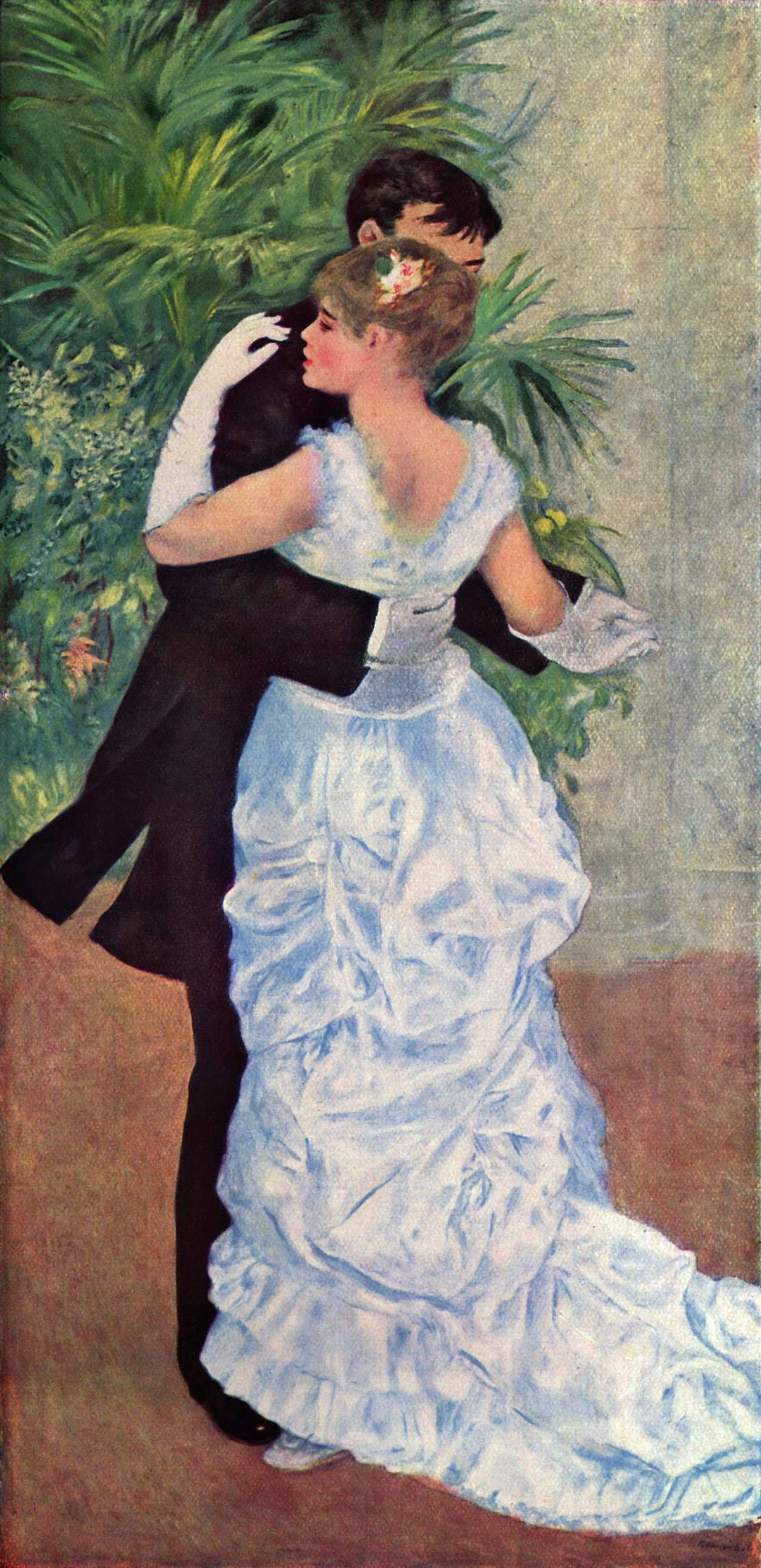
- Artist: Pierre-Auguste Renoir
- Year: 1883
- Type: Oil paint on canvas
- Location: Musée d'Orsay; Paris

Dance in the City is a painting created by the French artist Pierre-Auguste Renoir. Completed in 1883, the artwork is currently housed in the collection of the Musée d'Orsay. The dancers depicted in the painting are Suzanne Valadon, a model and artist, and Paul Auguste Lhôte, a friend of Renoir.

This particular artwork, along with its companion pieces Dance in the Country and Dance at Bougival, was commissioned by the art dealer Paul Durand-Ruel. All three paintings were executed in 1883 and feature two individuals dancing in different settings. While Aline Charigot, who later became Renoir's wife, modeled for the woman in Dance in the Country, Suzanne Valadon is the model for Dance in the City.

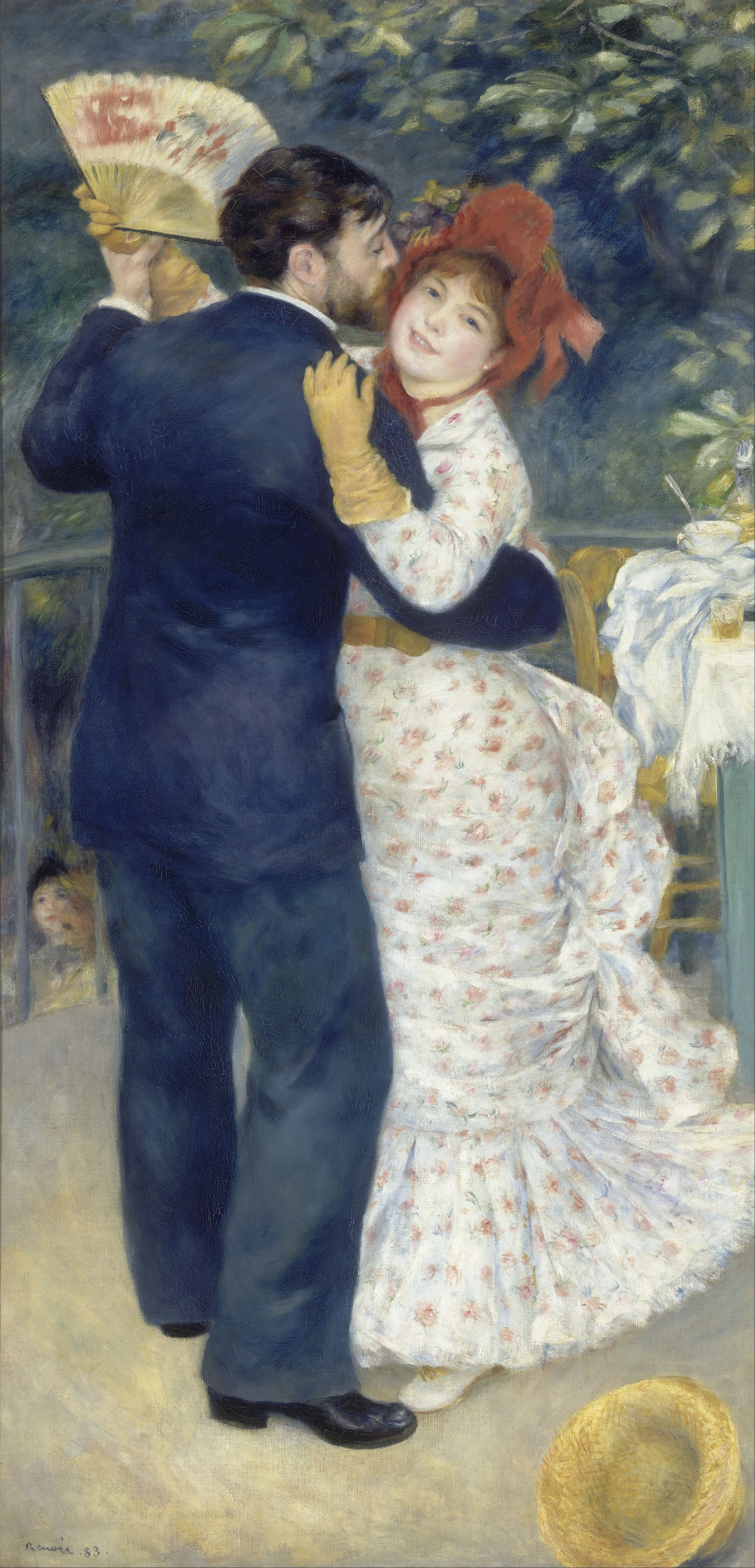
Dance in the Country, 1883

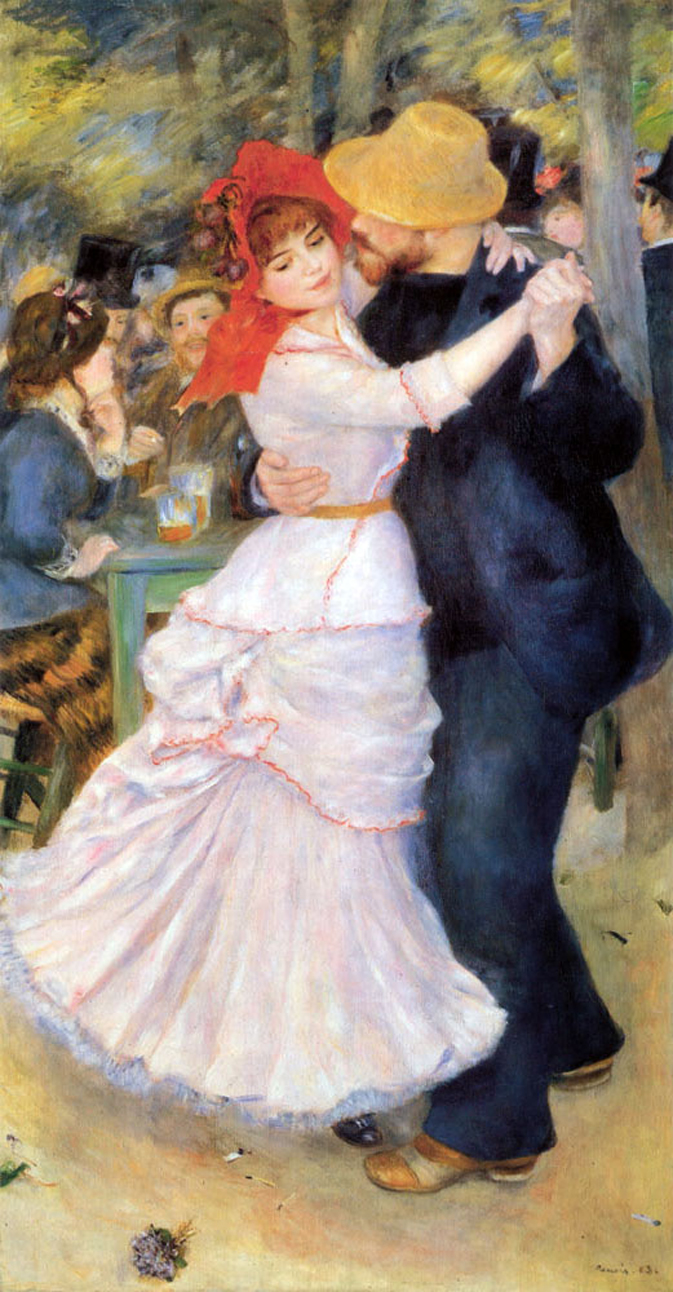
Dance at Bougival, 1883

== See also ==
- List of paintings by Pierre-Auguste Renoir
