= Dance in the Country =

Painting by Pierre-Auguste Renoir

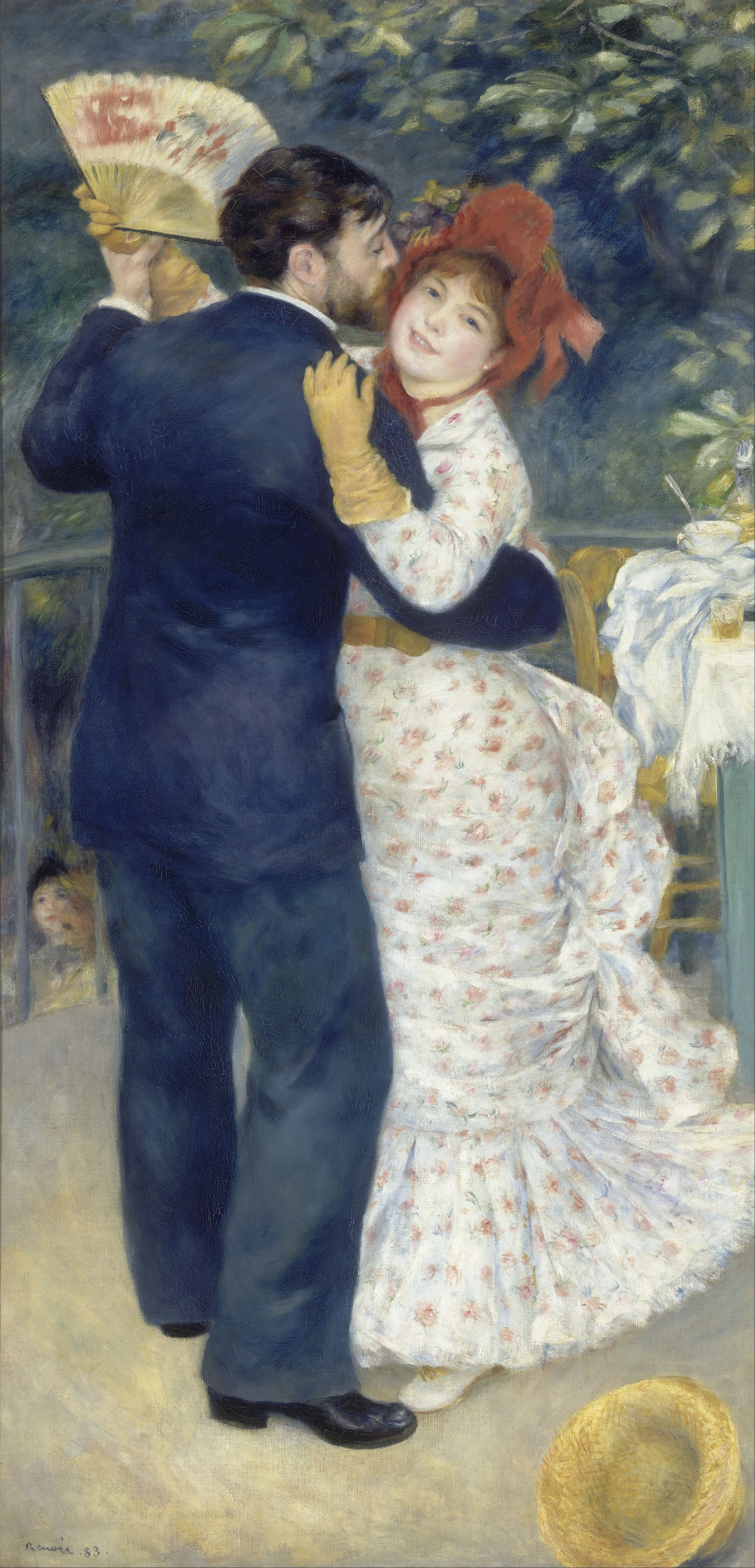
- Artist: Pierre-Auguste Renoir
- Year: 1883
- Medium: Oil on canvas
- Dimensions: 180 cm × 90 cm (71 in × 35 in)
- Location: Musée d'Orsay, Paris

Dance in the Country (French: Danse à la campagne) is an 1883 oil painting by French artist Pierre-Auguste Renoir. It is currently kept at the Musée d'Orsay in Paris.

== Background ==
This painting was commissioned in 1882 by the merchant Paul Durand-Ruel who wanted works on the theme of the ball. He bought it in 1886, exhibited it for the first time in April 1883, and kept it until Renoir's death in 1919. Two complementary painting on the same theme, named Dance in the City and Dance at Bougival, were also painted by Renoir the same year.

The painting, influenced by the artist's trip in Italy in 1881 where he found inspiration from Raphael, marked an evolution of the painter who tried then to break away from Impressionism.

== Description ==
The painting depicts a couple dancing under a chestnut tree: the man is Paul Lhôte, a friend of the painter, and the woman is Aline Charigot, who later became the wife of the painter. Both figures are painted life-size and occupy almost the entire painting. However, a table in the background on the right, and a hat on the ground, and a pair of faces below the level of the dance floor, can be seen. The woman who holds a fan in her right hand, displays a smiling face and looks towards the viewer. The scene is bathed in a bright and cheerful atmosphere, and the women's clothes use warm colors (yellow gloves, red hat).

== Companion pieces ==
The paintings two companion pieces, Dance in the City and Dance at Bougival, also show a couple dancing.

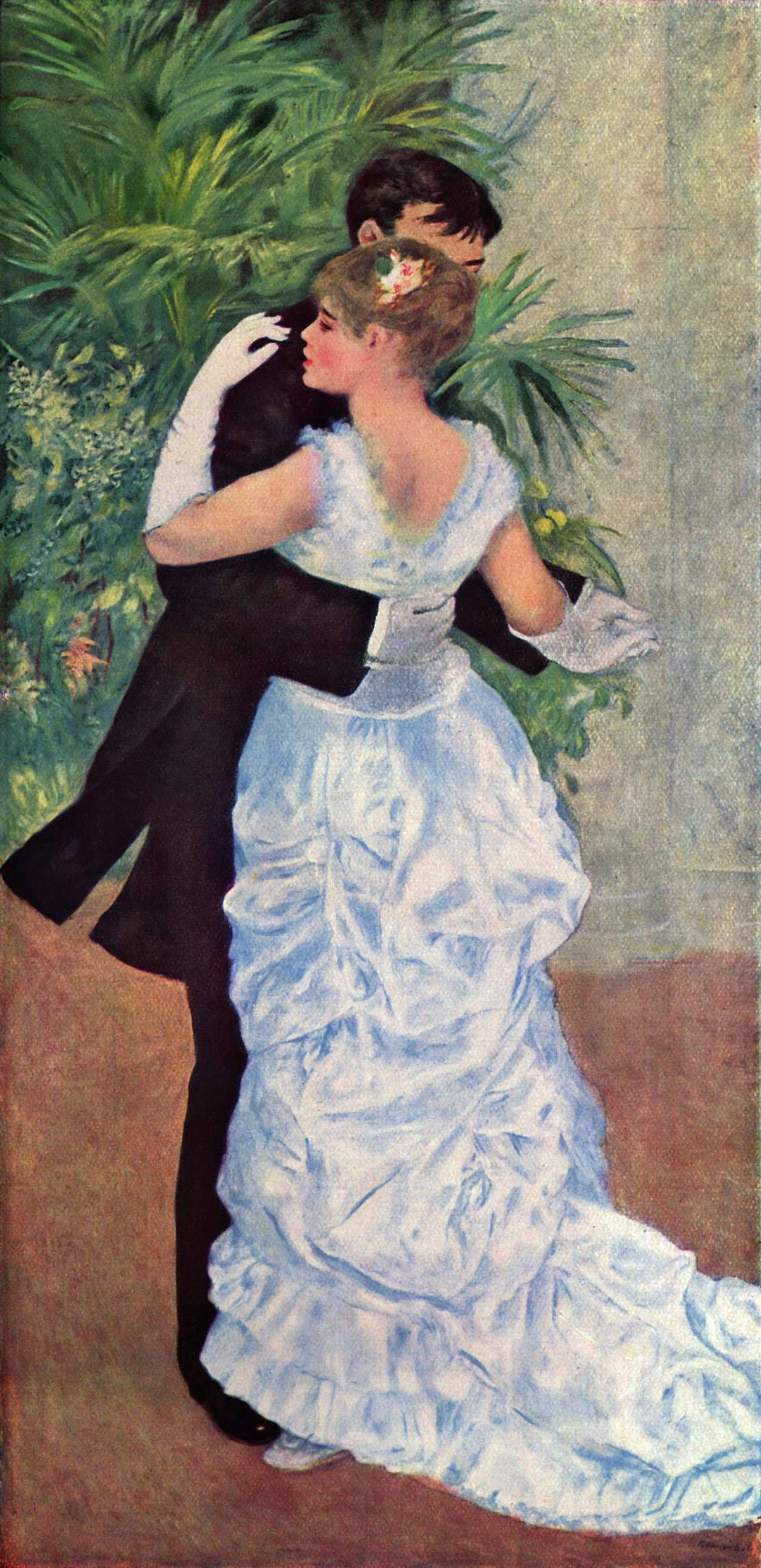
Dance in the City, 1883

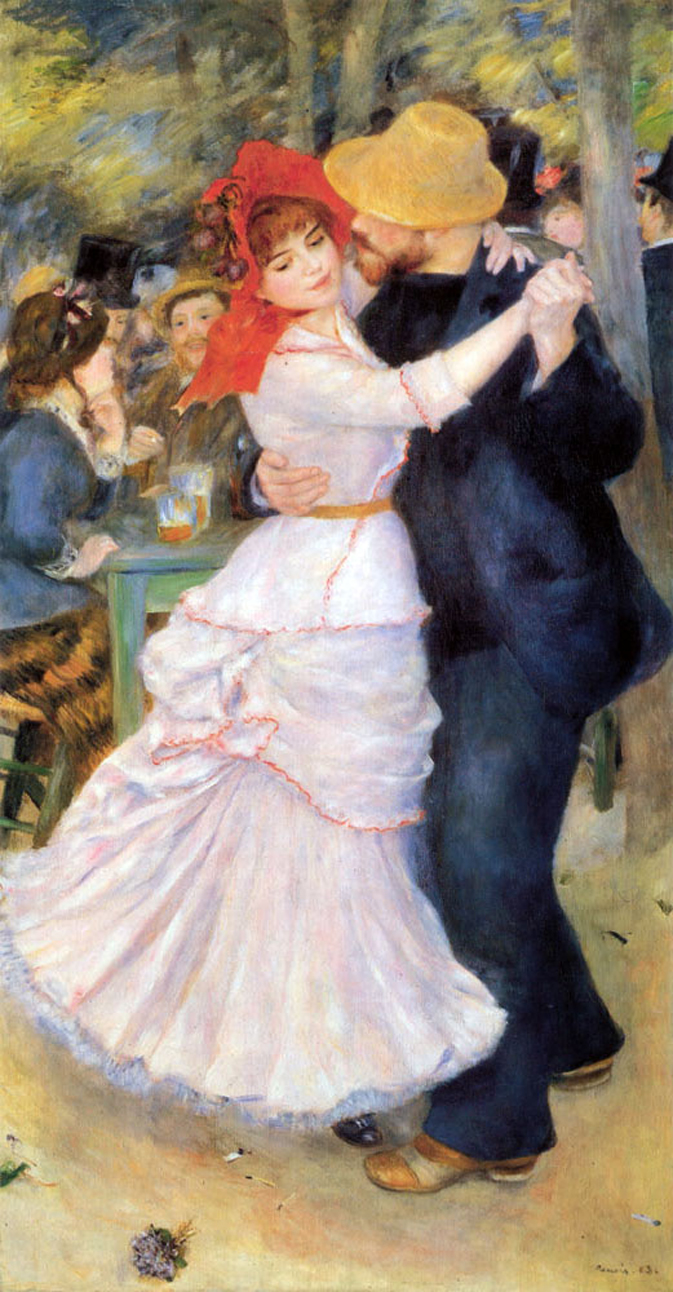
Dance at Bougival, 1883

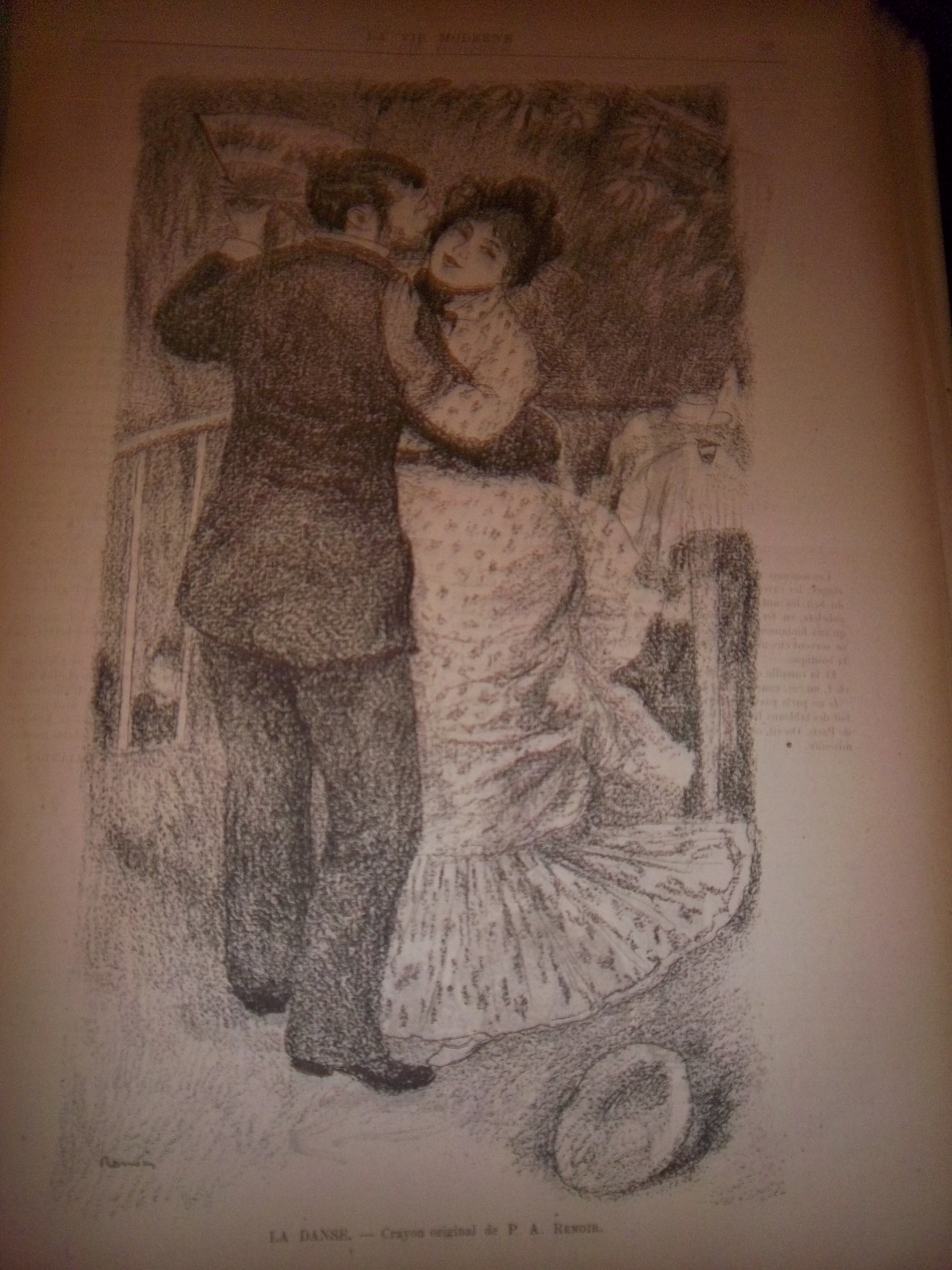
Reproduction of Renoir's sketch for the work 1884 - La Danse

== See also ==
- List of paintings by Pierre-Auguste Renoir
