= Essoyes =

Commune in Grand Est, France

- Commune
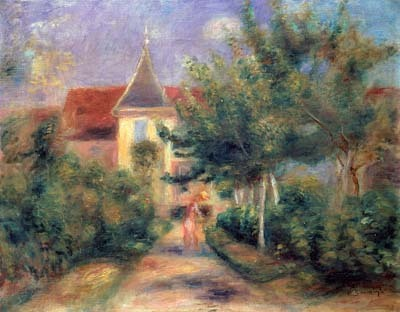
- House at Essoyes by Pierre-Auguste Renoir

- Coat of arms
- Location of Essoyes
- Location within France Location within Grand Est
- Coordinates: 48°03′30″N 4°32′07″E
- Country: France
- Region: Grand Est
- Department: Aube
- Arrondissement: Troyes
- Canton: Bar-sur-Seine

Government
  - Mayor (2020–2026): Thierry Mercuzot
- Area^{1}: 35.57 km^{2} (13.73 sq mi)
- Elevation: 190 m (620 ft)
- Highest elevation: 337 m (1,106 ft)
- Lowest elevation: 175 m (574 ft)
- Population (2023): 708
  - Density: 19.9/km^{2} (51.6/sq mi)
- Time zone: UTC+01:00 (CET)
  - Summer (DST): UTC+02:00 (CEST)
- INSEE/Postal code: 10141 /10360
- ^{1} French Land Register data, which excludes lakes, ponds, glaciers > 1 km^{2} (0.386 sq mi or 247 acres) and river estuaries.

Essoyes (French pronunciation: [ɛswa]) is a commune in the Aube department in north-central France.

Impressionist artist Pierre-Auguste Renoir had a house in the town. The village, hometown of his wife Aline and model and governess of his children Gabrielle Renard, are represented in many of his paintings.

== Geography ==
Essoyes is a quiet Champagne village located about 50 kilometres (30 mi) south of Troyes, on the banks of the Ource river. The Ource, a tributary of the Seine, was well loved by Renoir.

With 745 inhabitants, the village is found at the center of Champagne's Côte des Bar, on the border of Champagne and Bourgogne.

== History ==
Abbé Petel, born in Essoyes, recorded the history of the village in two volumes written in 1895.

The existence of inhabitants at the site of Essoyes on the Ource river can be traced as far back as the time of the Celts. Written evidence of the village first appeared in the ninth century. Molesme Abbey exerted a strong influence over Essoyes, as the town was solidly situated between Molesme and Clairvaux. The town was held under the proprietorship of the Sommievre family until the French Revolution.

At the center of the town once stood the ancient church of Saint-Remi, among the most remarkable Romanesque buildings in the Aube. The church was destroyed in 1855, and the current church was consecrated in 1865. Of particular note are the church's stained glass windows and organ, given by the Heriot family. The church's organ is classified as a historic monument.

Many windmills are found along the Ource. In the mid seventeenth century, paper-making was a major industry in the area, and production continued until the end of the eighteenth century.

On 12 March 1763, Essoyes was ravaged by a fire. At the time, most houses were built of wood, with thatched roofs, and only the few homes constructed of stone were spared.

Only once in its history has Essoyes experienced a division. In 1894, the town of Troyes took over the property of Servigny as it offered the town a much needed source of water. Servigny has an eleventh-century edifice that served as a chapel dedicated to Saint Bernard. Today the chapel is a historic monument. Saint Bernard, the founder of Clairvaux Abbey, liked to take time to rest in this area between Molesme and Clairvaux.

The French Revolution saw Essoyes classified within the district of Bar-sur-Seine. From the seventh century until 1926, the town was a part of the ancient arrondissement of Bar-sur-Seine. In 1926, Essoyes became a part of the arrondissement of Troyes.

The old château, bought and expanded by Olympe Heriot at the end of the nineteenth century, was bought back by the town in 1936. A school was set up in the left wing of the building, and the tax office in the right wing.

The Darras school, which came about as a private establishment at the beginning of the twentieth century, was later transformed into the rectory in the 1920s. Since September 2001, the building has acted as the town's library and community center.

== Population ==
Historical population
Year	Pop.	±% p.a.
1968	741	—
1975	720	−0.41%
1982	679	−0.83%
1990	685	+0.11%
1999	650	−0.58%
2007	685	+0.66%
2012	745	+1.69%
2017	715	−0.82%
2023	708	−0.16%
Source: INSEE

== Sights ==
- The Maison de la Vigne, located in the château stables and constructed between 1890 and 1892 by Olympe Heriot
- The workshop of Pierre-Auguste Renoir, constructed in 1905 in the garden of his family home on rue de l'Extra
- The cemetery, where the tomb of Renoir, his son Jean Renoir, and Auguste Heriot can be found

== Personalities ==
- Auguste Heriot (1826–1879), co-founder of the Grands Magasins du Louvre
- Olympe Heriot (1833–1899), brother of Auguste Heriot, director of the Grands Magasins du Louvre and founder of the Orphelinat-Ecole Heriot
- Pierre-Auguste Renoir (1841-1919), French artist who was a leading painter in the development of the Impressionist style.

== See also ==
- Communes of the Aube department
