= Aline Charigot =

Wife and model of Auguste Renoir, 1859-1915

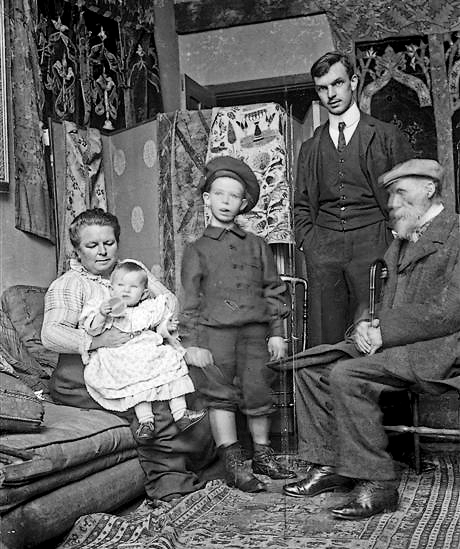
- Aline, Claude, Jean, Pierre and Auguste Renoir (l - r) about 1902
- Born: Aline Victorine Charigot; 23 May 1859 (Note: Her dates of birth and death are variously reported. For her birth 23 May seems agreed and 1860 is usually reported whereas her gravestone says 1859. Her date of death is most commonly given as 27 June rather than 15 June but it seems agreed she died in 1915.); Essoyes, Aube, France
- Died: 27 June 1915 (aged 56); Nice, France
- Burial place: Essoyes
- Occupations: Artist's model, homemaker
- Known for: Model for Auguste Renoir
- Spouse: Auguste Renoir (m. 1890)
- Children: Pierre; Jean; Claude

Aline Victorine Charigot (23 May 1859 – 27 June 1915) was a model for Auguste Renoir and later became his wife while continuing to model for him and then caring for him when he became disabled. She is pictured in many of his paintings over very many years, most famously in the early 1880s Luncheon of the Boating Party (where she is the woman on the left with the little dog), and Blonde Bather. They had three children together, two of whom, Pierre and Jean, went on to have distinguished careers in film, and the third, Claude, became a ceramic artist. Pierre had a son Claude who became a well-known cinematographer. She predeceased her elderly husband.

== Biography ==
Aline Charigot was born on 23 May 1859 to a farming family who cultivated grapes in Essoyes in the department of Aube, France. When she was still a baby her father went to America and her mother moved away leaving Aline to be looked after by her aunt and uncle. She received little education. In 1874, she followed her mother to Montmartre, Paris, where she worked as a dressmaker. In about 1880 she met Auguste Renoir, when she was twenty and he nearly forty, and started modelling for him. She gave birth to their first son, Pierre, in 1885 and they married in Paris on 14 April 1890. They had two other sons, Jean born 1894 and Claude born 1901.

From 1888, the couple spent progressively more time living in Essoyes, buying a house there in 1896. In 1903, they moved to Cagnes-sur-Mer, building a new house there, Les Collettes, between 1905 and 1909.

Pierre became a prominent stage and film actor; Jean became a famous film auteur, actor, and author; and Claude became a ceramic artist. Pierre had a son Claude (Aline and Auguste's grandson) who became the well-known cinematographer.

After Claude's birth she developed diabetes but hid this from her husband. Pierre and Jean were drafted into the army in World War I and both were injured, Jean badly so. Aline died from a heart attack in Nice on 27 June 1915 after a hospital visit to Jean so predeceasing her elderly and disabled husband by four years. She was buried in the south of France and then her remains were moved to Essoyes to be alongside her mother.

== Personality ==
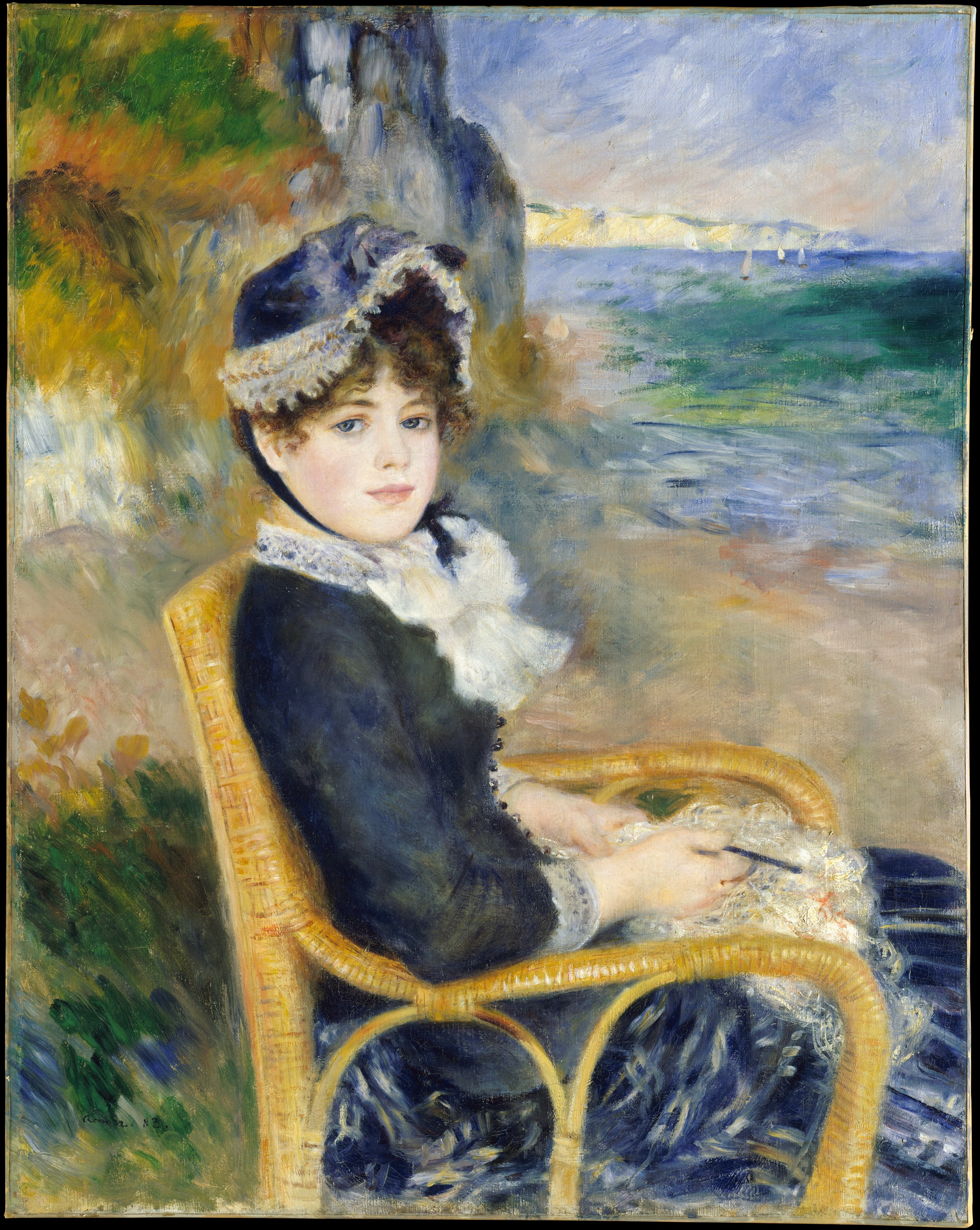
By the Seashore, 1883

Charigot had a love of the arts – she played the piano (Note: Apparently she was swept away by Emmanuel Chabrier's performance of España.) and decorated her bedroom with paintings by Johan Jongkind. According to Ambroise Vollard, in 1907 she designed and managed the building of the Renoirs' new villa at Cagnes-sur-Mer. She took care of her children as they grew up and supervised their various nannies and maids, notable amongst whom was her cousin Gabrielle Renard. This became very important as Renoir's rheumatoid arthritis became severe as he aged. She was blonde and had become comfortably plump from quite a young age. Renoir's biographer, Barbara White, describes the appearance of the model in the 1881 Blonde Bather as "rotund" and the 1885 and 1886 portraits being of a curvaceous woman.

== Modelling ==
Charigot modelled for Renoir's paintings, sculptures and drawings over a long period from 1880 to 1915. She only sat for three portraits by her husband but she appeared in many of his subject paintings. In the 1880s, she was Renoir's main model for the period in which he changed his manner of figure painting and broke away from Impressionism in a return to the old masters. This became known as his Ingresque style or period.

After her death Renoir made a terracotta sculpture of Aline as a maquette for a monument for her grave. Because of his arthritis he supervised the sculptor Richard Guino in doing the modelling, based in his 1885 painting of her nursing their first child (see below). The monument was never created but the work was used as a basis for a bronze bust placed by her grave.

== Gallery ==
This list includes Renoir's main works of or including Aline Charigot. Some paintings have been done in several similar versions – in these cases a representative one has been chosen.

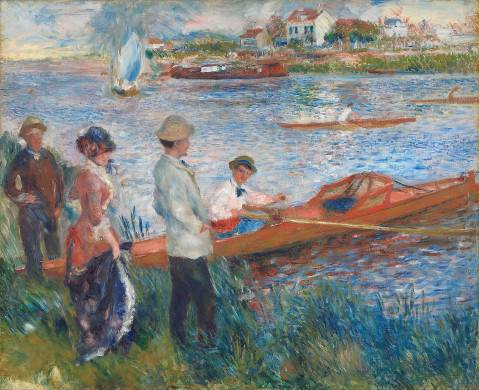
Oarsmen at Chatou, 1879

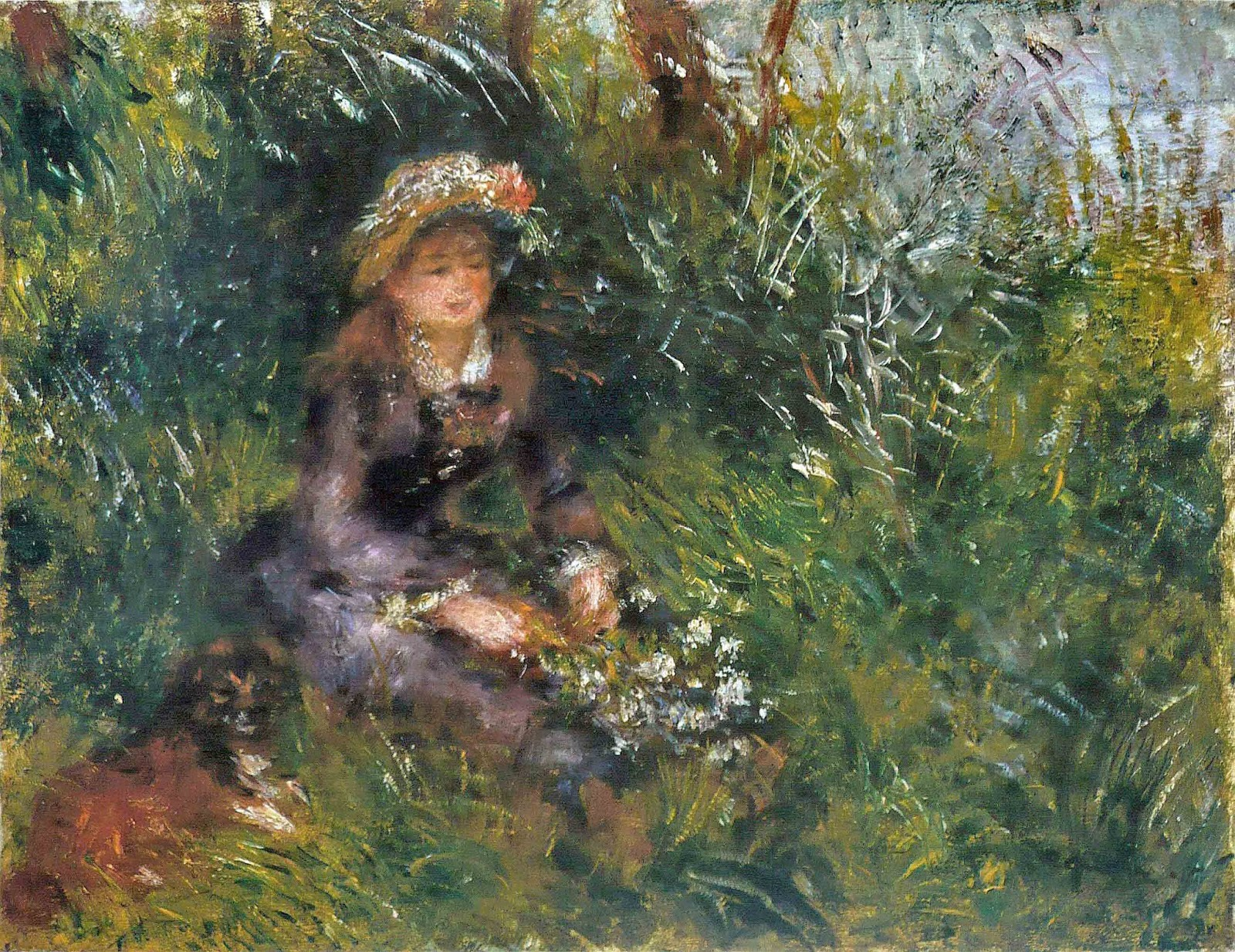
Madame Renoir with a Dog, 1880

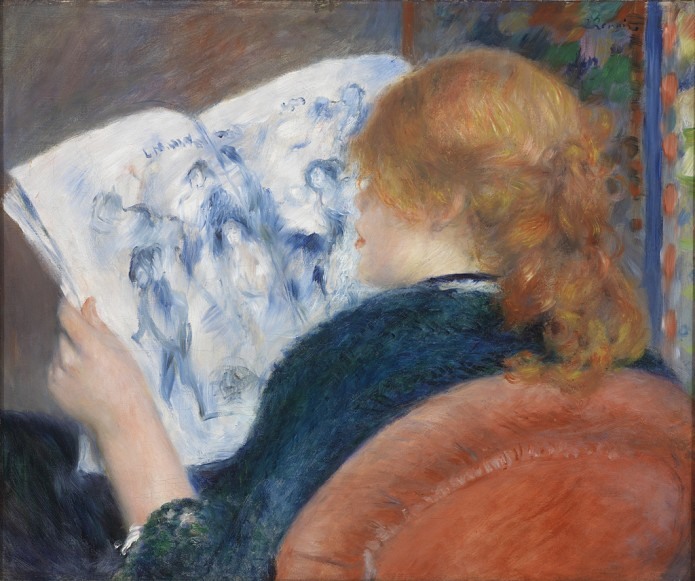
Young Woman reading an illustrated Journal, 1880

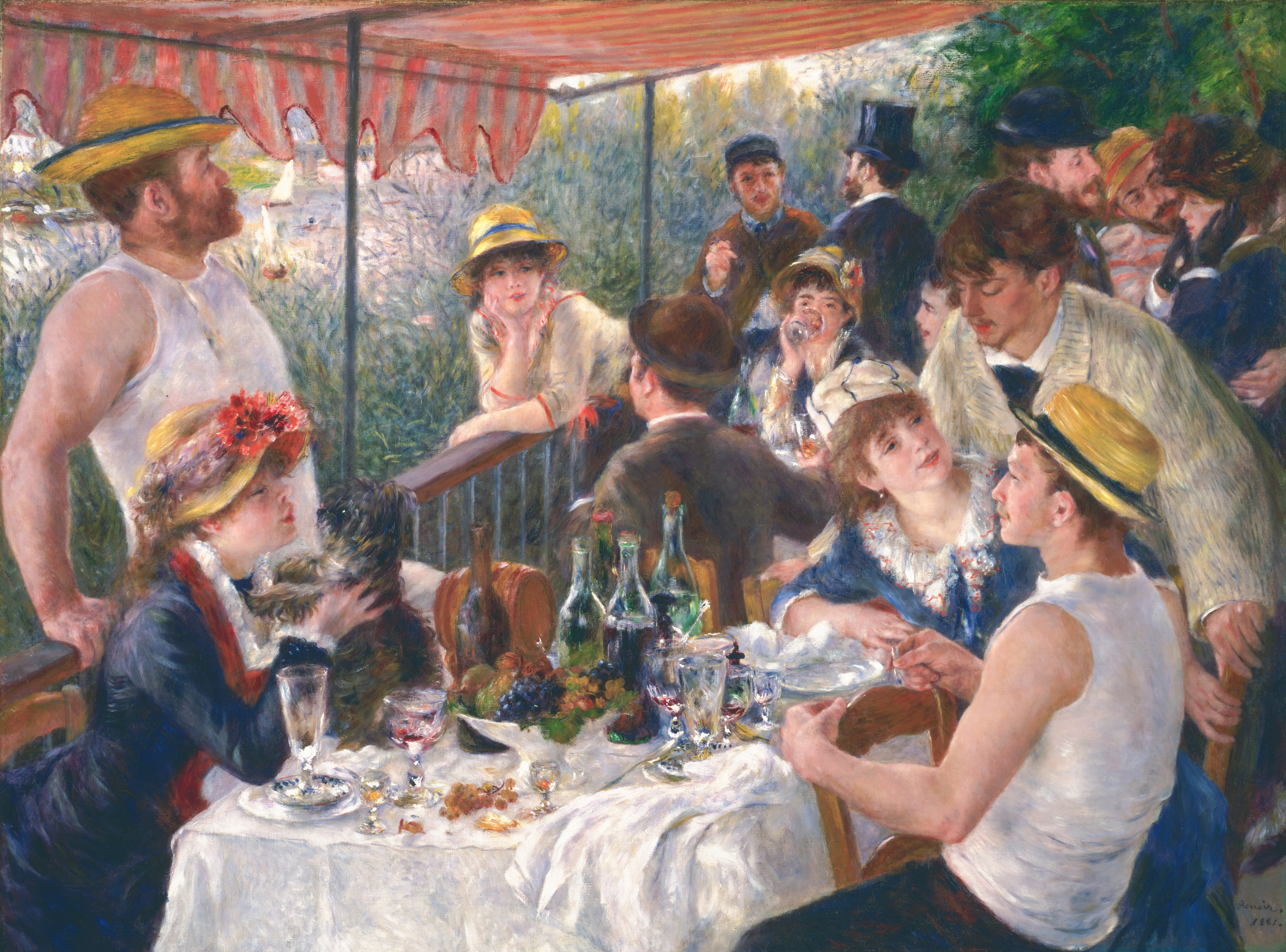
Luncheon of the Boating Party, 1880–1881

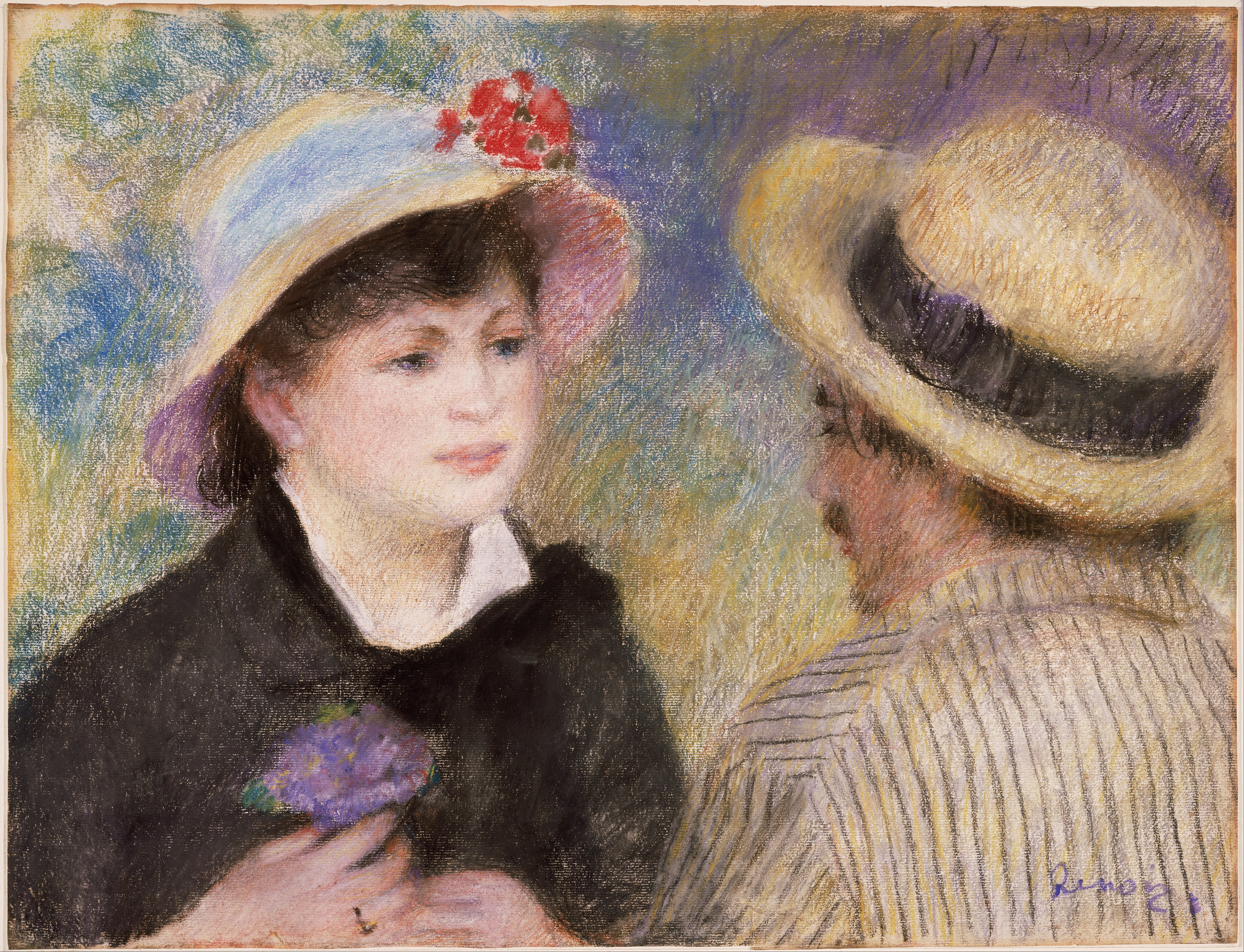
Boating Couple, 1881 Also known as Aline Charigot and Renoir.

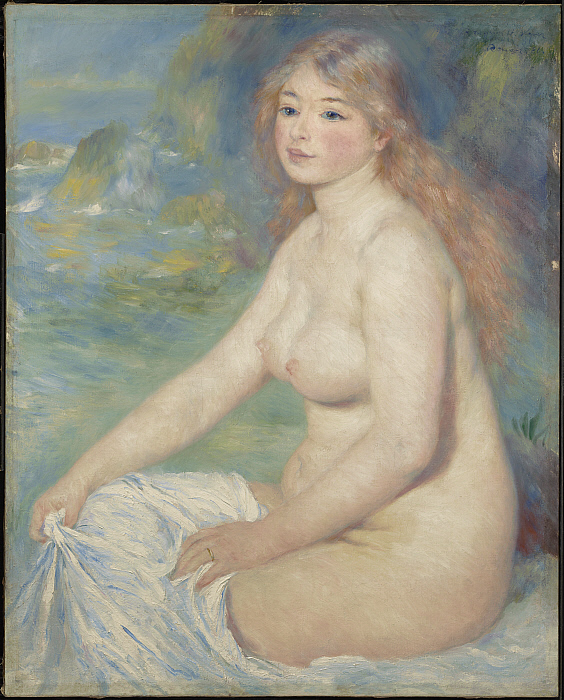
Blonde Bather, 1881

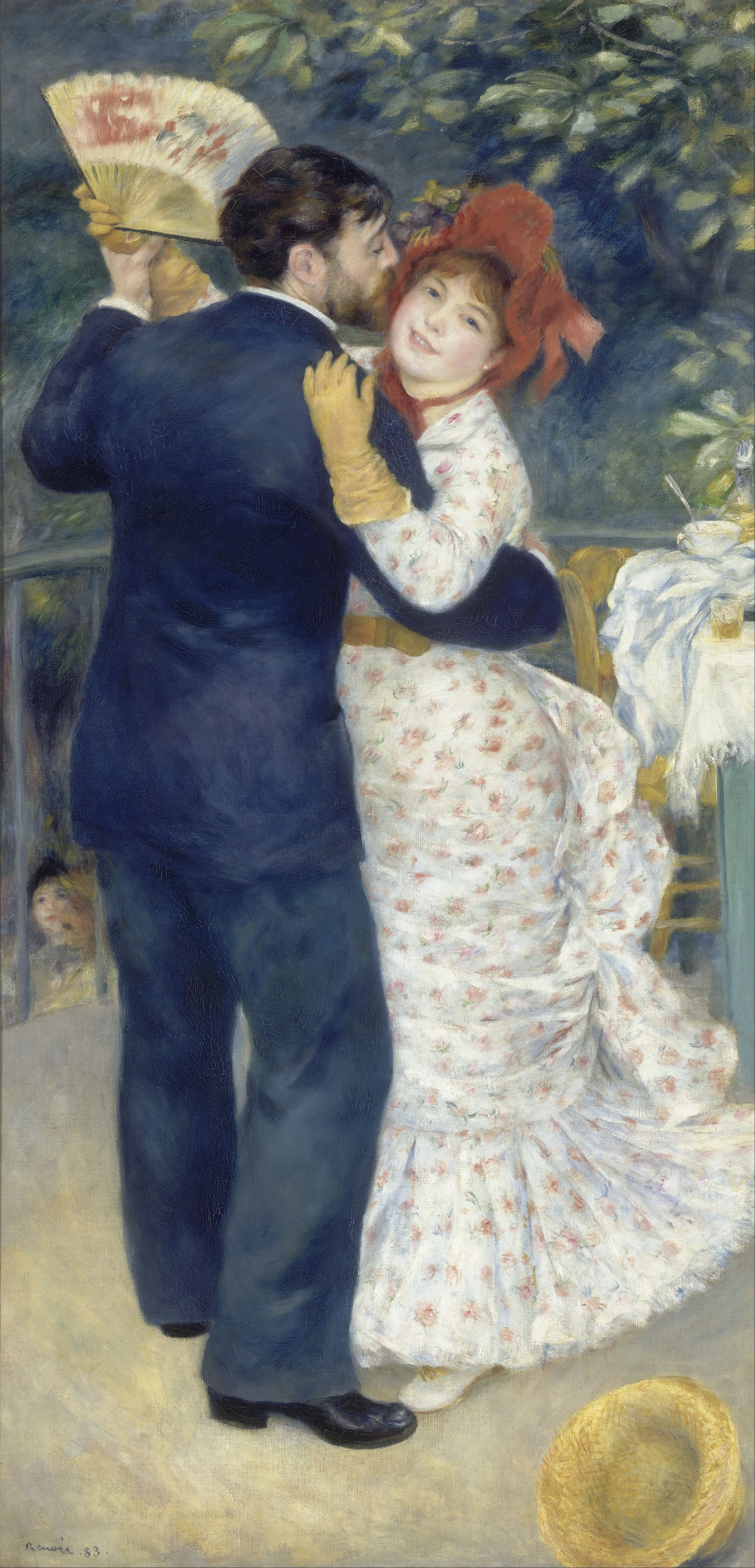
Dance in the Country, 1883 Suzanne Valadon posed for Dance in the City.

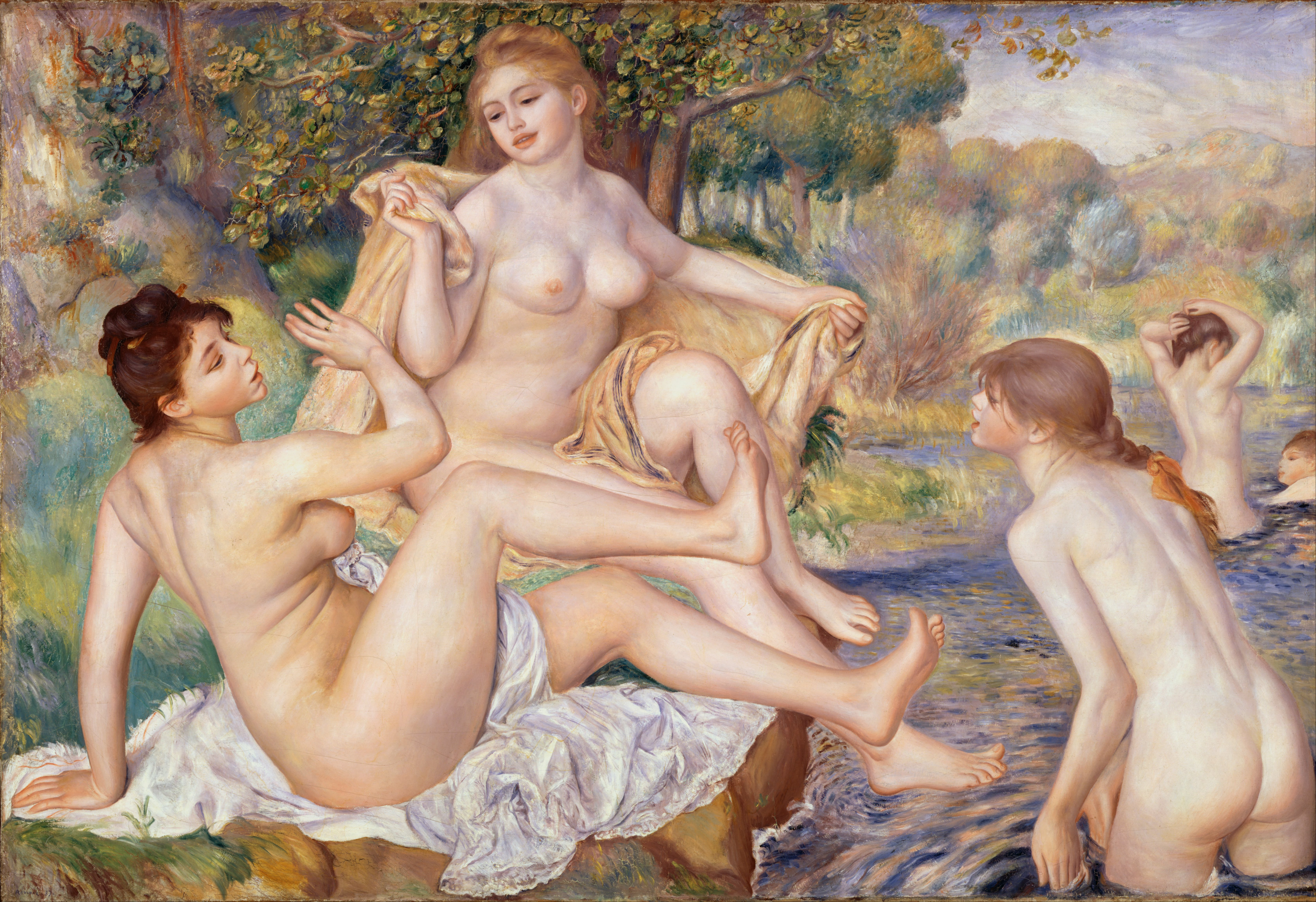
The Large Bathers, 1884–1887 Aline centre.

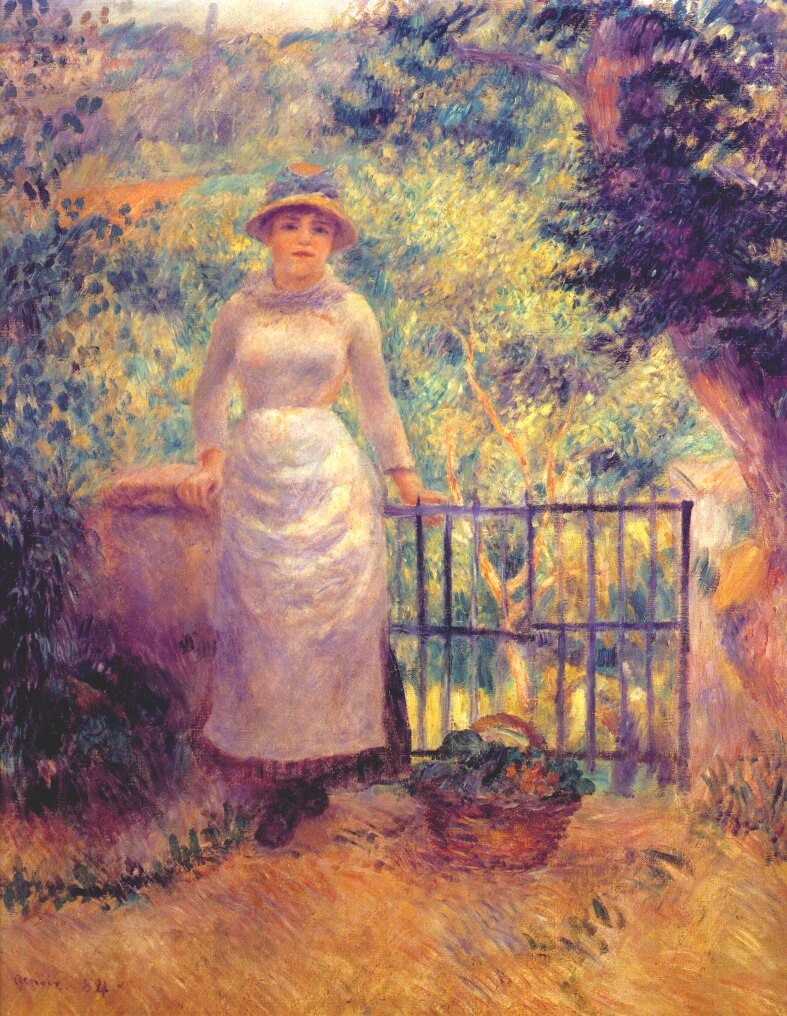
Aline at the Gate or Girl in the Garden, 1884

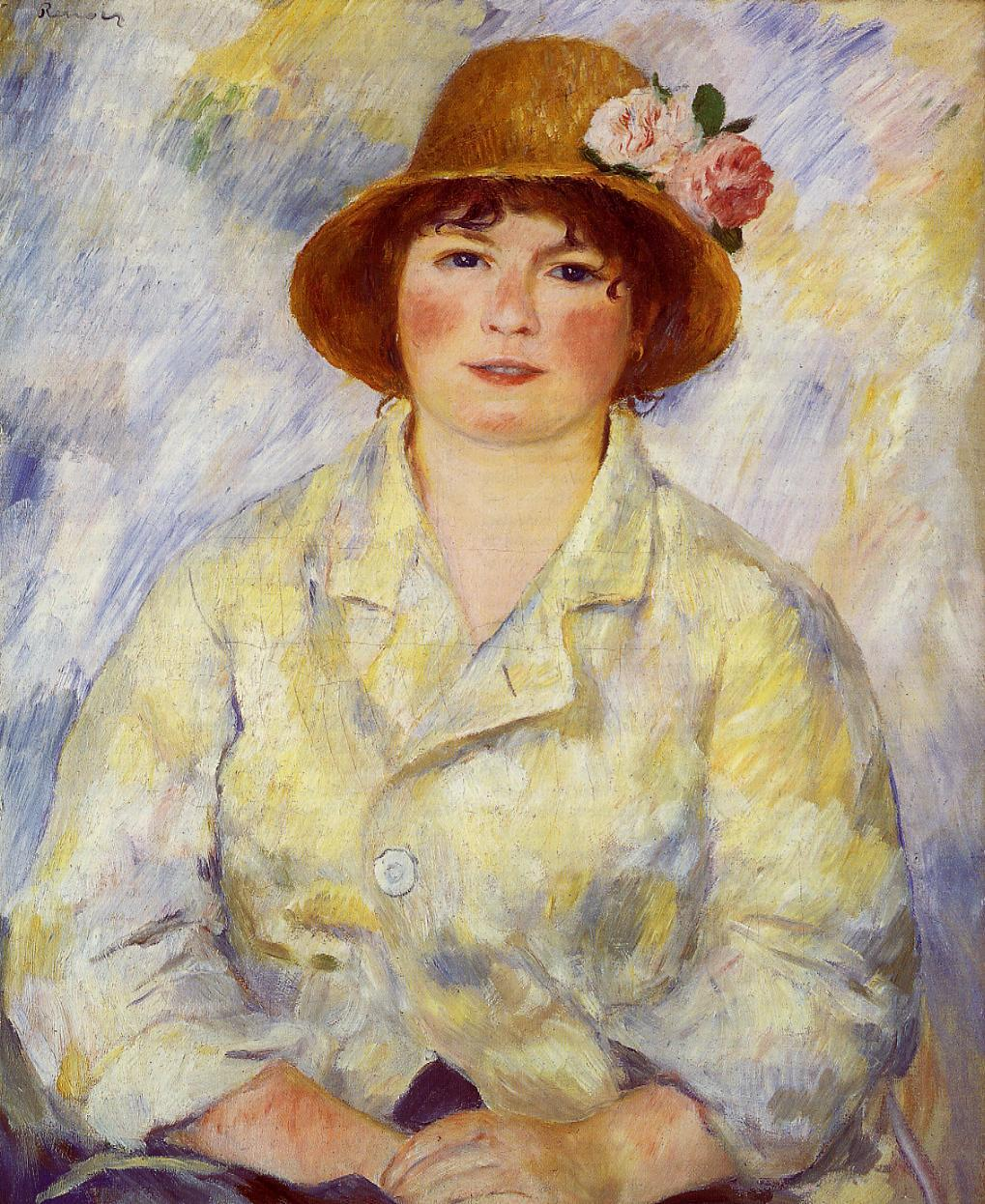
Portrait of Madame Renoir, 1885

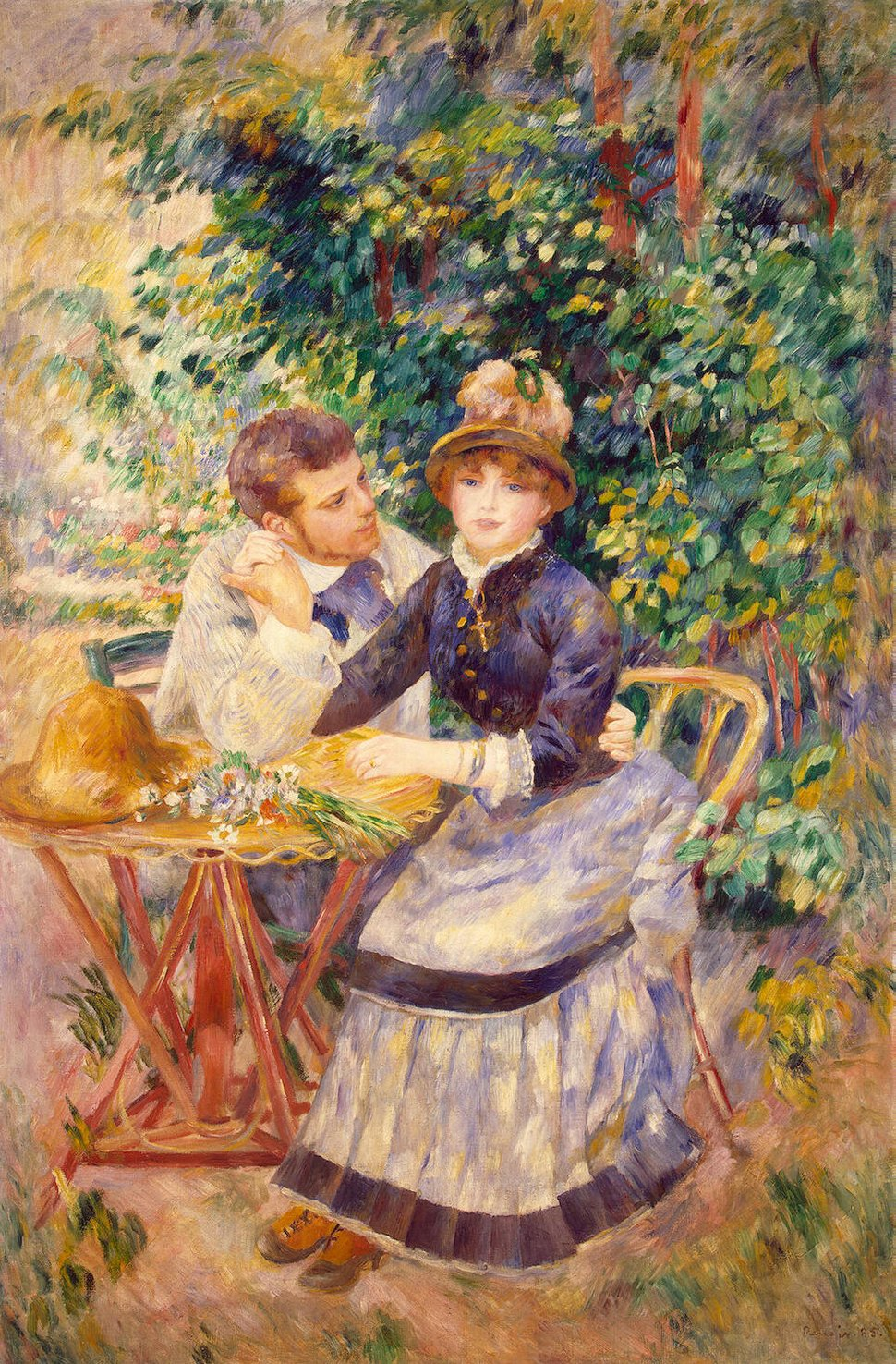
In the Garden, 1885

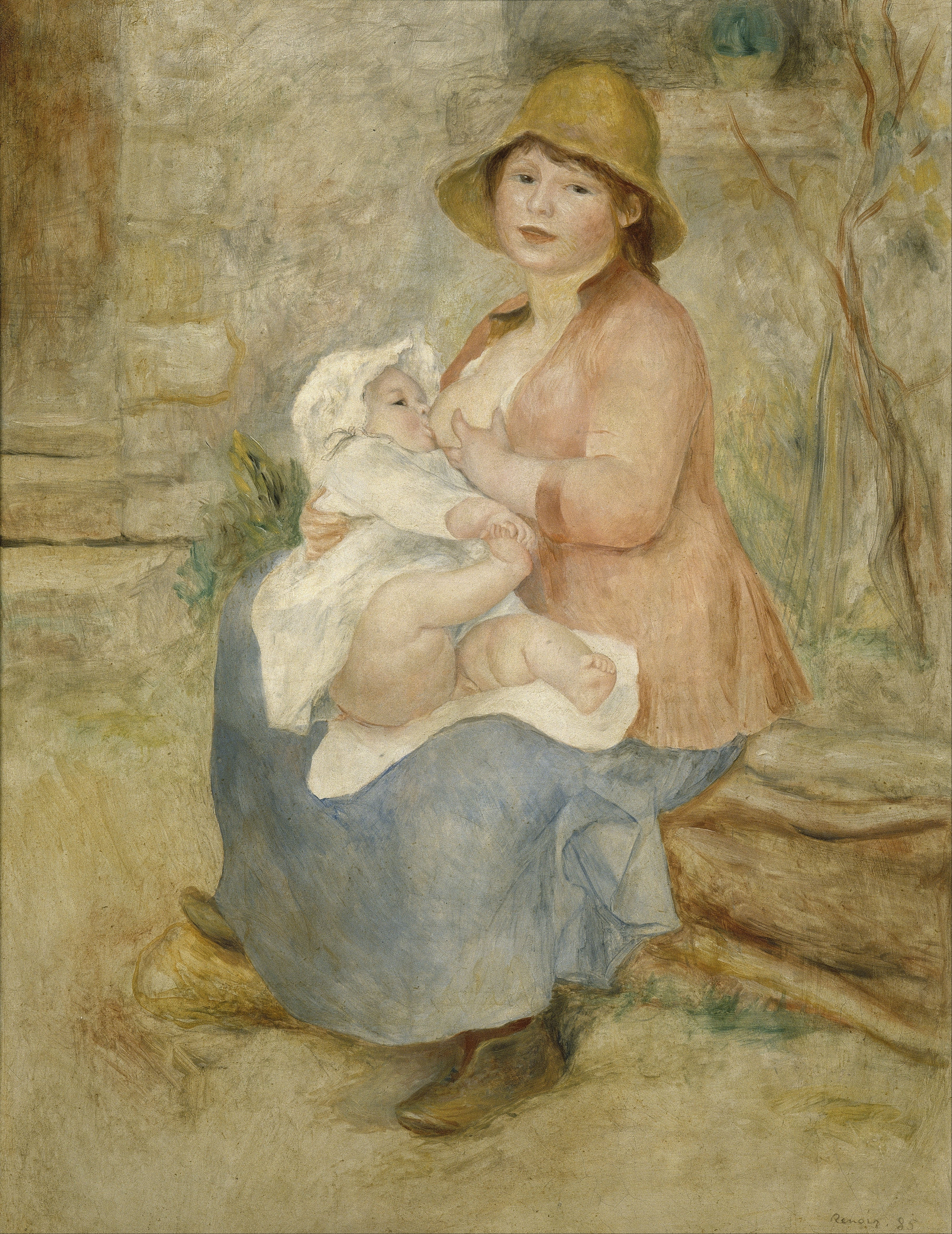
Maternity or Child at the Breast, 1885

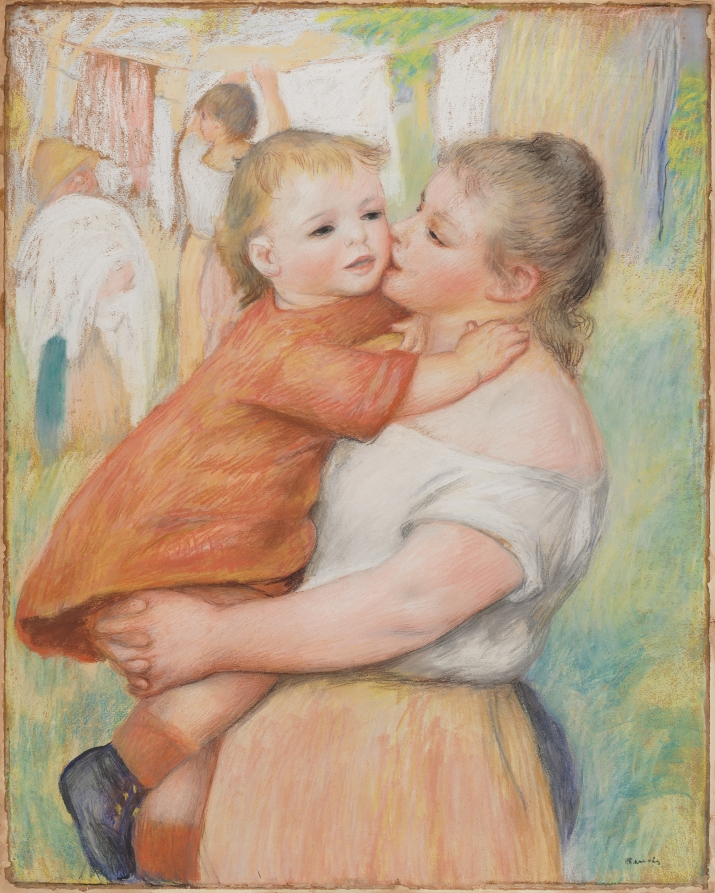
Mother and Child, 1886

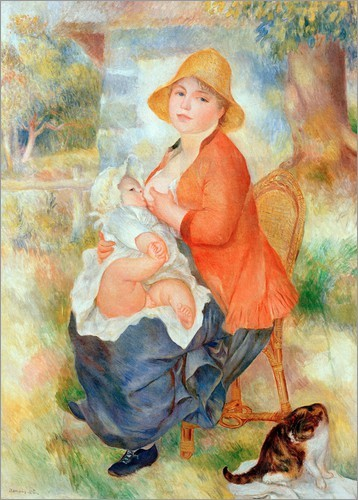
Maternity or Nursing (Aline and her Pierre), 1886

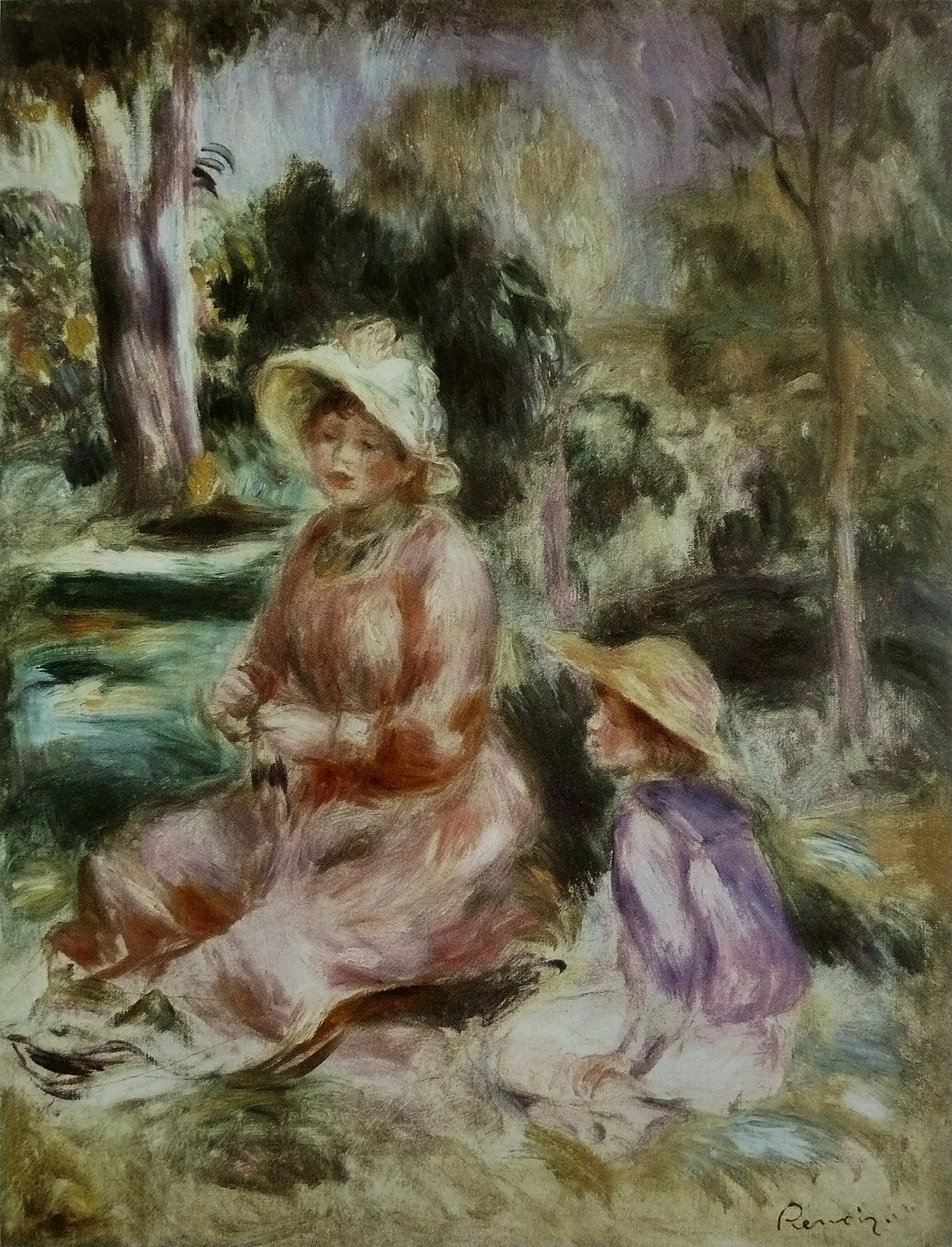
Madame Renoir and her son Pierre, 1890

The Apple Seller, 1890

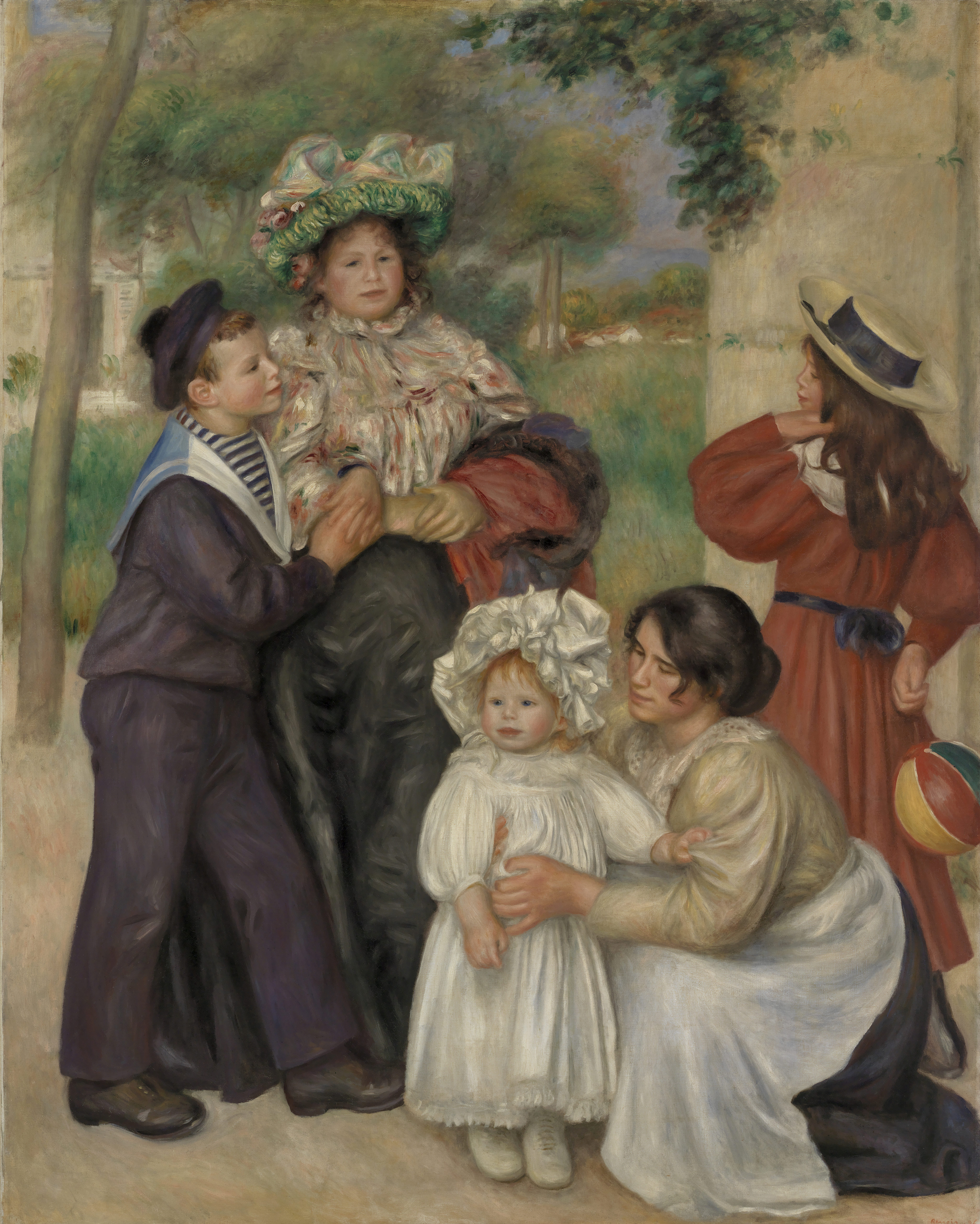
The Artist's Family, 1896 Aline with the hat.

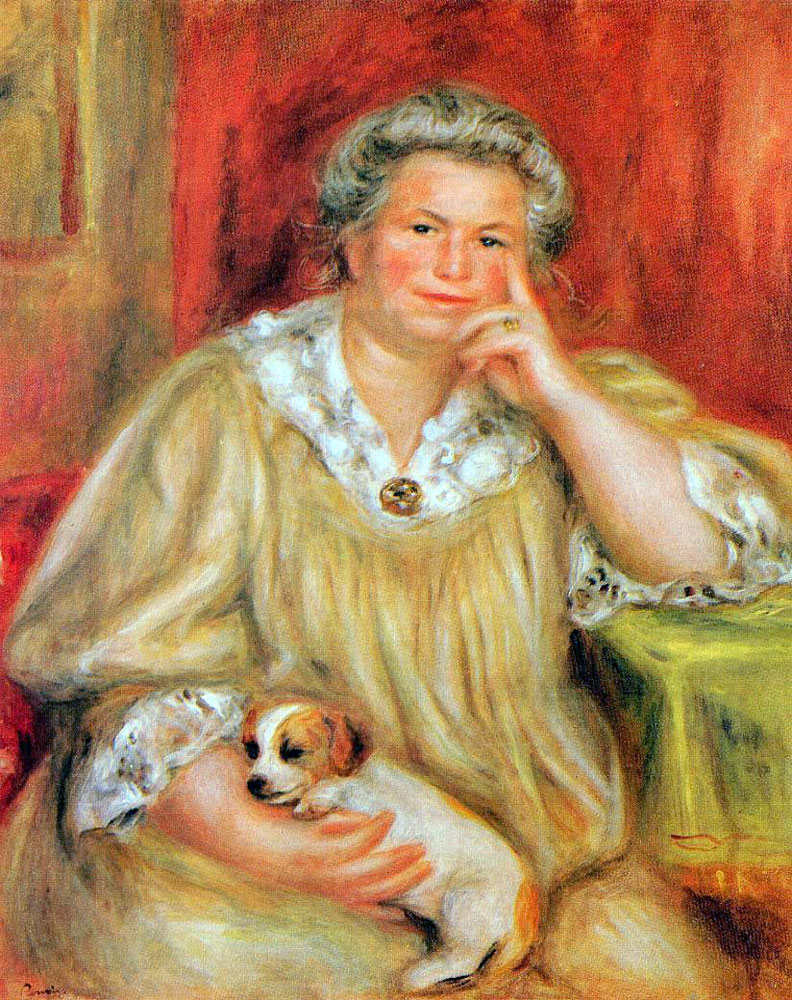
Madame Renoir and Bob, 1910
