= Lise Tréhot =

Girlfriend and model of the artist Pierre-Auguste Renoir

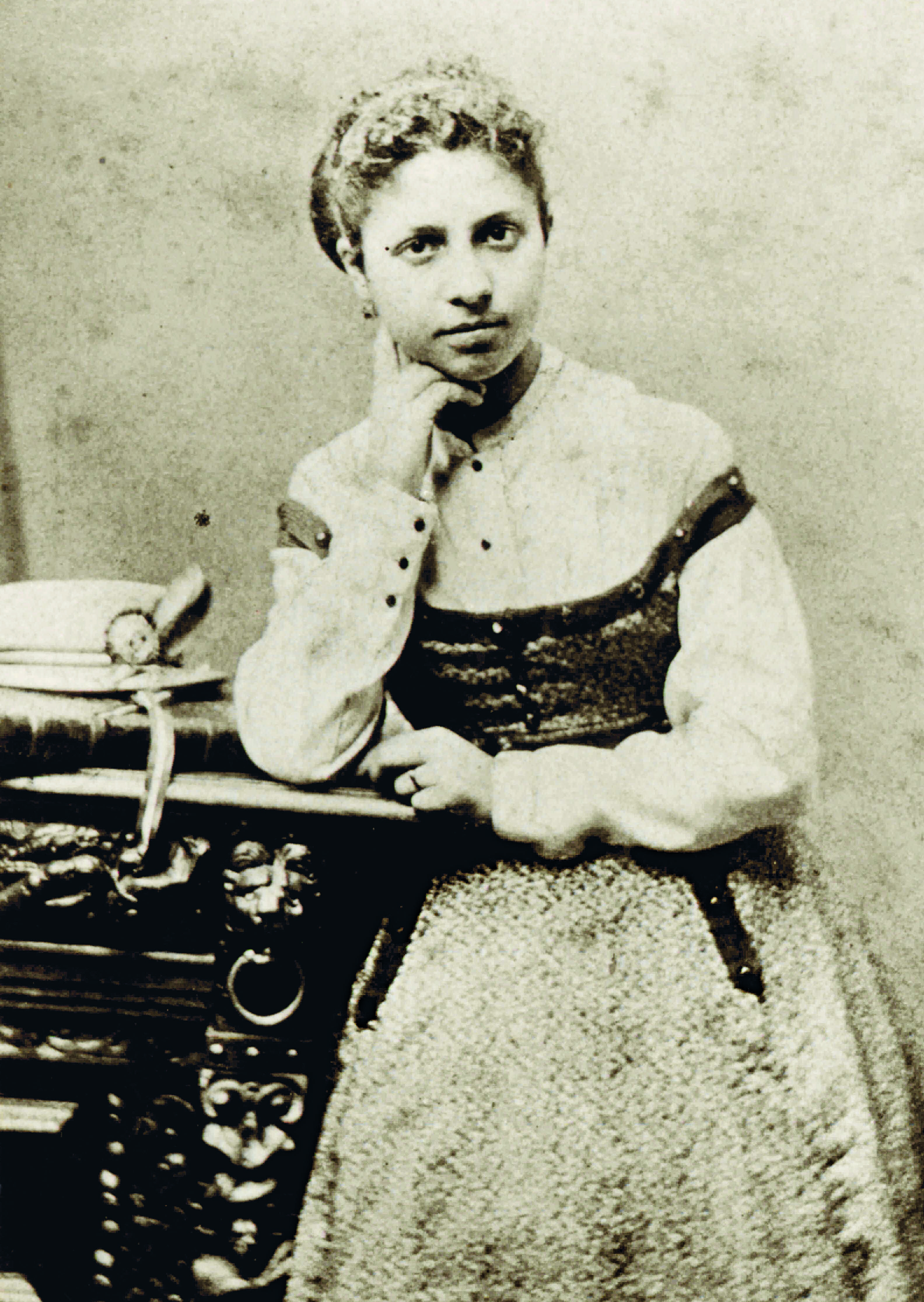
- Lise in 1864
- Born: 14 March 1848; Ecquevilly, Seine-et-Oise, France
- Died: 12 March 1922 (aged 73); Paris, 16th arrondissement, France
- Occupations: Art model, dressmaker
- Years active: 1866–1872
- Known for: Modeling for Pierre-Auguste Renoir

Lise Tréhot (14 March 1848 – 12 March 1922) was a French art model who posed for artist Pierre-Auguste Renoir from 1866 until 1872, during his early Salon period. She appeared in more than twenty paintings, including notable works such as Lise with a Parasol (1867) and In Summer (1868), and she was the model for almost all of Renoir's work featuring female figures at this time. Tréhot married Georges Brière de l'Isle in 1883 and raised four children to whom she bequeathed two of Renoir's paintings, Lise Sewing (1867–68) and Lise in a White Shawl (1872), both of which are currently held by the Dallas Museum of Art.

== Early life ==
Lise Tréhot was born in Ecquevilly, Seine-et-Oise, France, on 14 March 1848, to Louis Tréhot and Amelie Elisabeth Boudin. Her father was the postmaster of the town until the mid-1850s, after which he moved the entire family to Paris where he sold lemonade, tobacco, and wine at a shop in the 17th arrondissement. Lise was the fourth in a family of six children, including three brothers and two sisters. A document from this time describes Tréhot's profession as a dressmaker. Clémence Tréhot, her older sister, was the lover of artist Jules Le Cœur, who later introduced her to Pierre-Auguste Renoir at his house in Marlotte, possibly in June 1865.

== Modeling period ==
Tréhot began modeling for Renoir when she was about eighteen and he was twenty-five. Early paintings of Tréhot at this time include Lise in a Straw Hat (1866) and Lise Sewing (1867–68). Renoir is thought to have painted a modern nude of Tréhot as Diana (1867), but it was rejected by the Salon of 1867. (Note: Tréhot is generally accepted as the model for Diana, but in 2012, art historian Michael F. Zimmerman argued that it was not Tréhot. Curator Sylvie Patry of the Musée d'Orsay also questions whether Tréhot is the model.) Renoir found critical success the next year with Lise (1867), which was well received at the Salon of 1868. The Impressionist painting depicts Tréhot in a life-size portrait, strolling through a wooded park as sunlight falls through the trees. Art critic Zacharie Astruc described Tréhot in Lise as "the likeable Parisian girl in the woods", and as a working-class girl. Émile Zola also approved, comparing Tréhot to Monet's model and later wife Camille Doncieux. French art critic Théodore Duret later observed that because Renoir's Lise was derivative of Gustave Courbet's technique, its appearance at the Salon "provoked no definite opposition". However, Renoir's decision to shadow Tréhot's face in darkness and emphasize the reflection of sunlight from her white dress in Lise led several critics to ridicule Tréhot's appearance due to the unusual contrast.

At the Salon of 1869, Tréhot appeared in a work named In Summer (1868), dressed casually in a loose blouse falling off her shoulders. John Collins notes that Tréhot's "dark, heavy-set and expressionless features" worked well in such portraits, but were less successful in more formal, costume-oriented paintings such as The Engaged Couple (1868), where she poses with artist Alfred Sisley. In the summer of 1869, she accompanied Renoir to his parents’ house in the Ville-d'Avray, and made trips to the Seine near Bougival where Renoir painted scenes with Monet on the water. La Barque (1870) is thought to depict Lise during this summer holiday.

In total, Tréhot appeared in over twenty paintings by Renoir during his early Salon period from approximately 1866 until 1872. According to art historian John House, "Lise was the model for virtually all of Renoir's female figures at this time".

Although little is known about the exact nature of Tréhot's relationship with Renoir while she was modeling; she is said to have given birth to a baby boy named Pierre on 14 December 1868, but it is unclear what became of him and he may have died as an infant. On 21 July 1870, Tréhot gave birth to a baby girl named Jeanne (d. 1934) who was given to a wet nurse to raise as her own. Renoir continued to secretly support Jeanne financially until he died (and after his death with the help of Ambroise Vollard), but never publicly or legally acknowledged that she was his daughter during his lifetime.

For unknown reasons, Tréhot stopped modeling for Renoir after 1872; it was said that she never spoke to or saw him again. Although Tréhot was an important part of Renoir's early career, he never mentioned her in any published interviews, memoirs, or biographies.

== Later life ==
In 1883, more than a decade after Tréhot stopped modeling for Renoir, she married architect Georges Brière de l'Isle (1847–1902). As the wife of Brière de l'Isle, she raised two sons and two daughters. Tréhot bequeathed two of Renoir's paintings, Lise Sewing (1867–68) and Lise in a White Shawl (1872), to her children. It is said that before her death, she destroyed many of her personal papers related to her time modeling for Renoir. Tréhot died in Paris, in the 16th arrondissement, on 12 March 1922, at the age of 73. She is buried in the Père Lachaise Cemetery.

== Selected works as model ==
Tréhot's list of selected works includes at least twenty-six oil on canvas paintings, twenty-four of which were painted by Renoir, while two are by Frédéric Bazille (1841–1870). It is thought that Tréhot may have posed for as many as twenty-three works for Renoir, but only once for Bazille; Renoir's Landscape with Two People (1866), in which she appeared, has survived only as a fragment of the lower left corner, known as Woman with Bird (La Fille a l'Oiseau). Landscape with Two People is preserved as a painting within a painting in Bazille's Studio (1870), the only known surviving image of the full painting. Tréhot is believed to have posed for La Toilette (1869–70), another work by Bazille. At least one painting, Diana (1867), is disputed, and is thought to feature a model other than Tréhot.

Year	Image	Title	Type	Dimensions	Gallery	Notes
1866		Lise in a Straw Hat (Jeune fille au chapeau de paille)	Oil on canvas	47 × 38.4 cm	Barnes Foundation	
1866		Standing Young Woman	Oil on canvas	24.5 × 14 cm	Private collection	
1866		Young Woman Seated in the Countryside	Oil on canvas	24.5 × 14 cm	Private collection	
1866		Woman Standing by a Tree	Oil on canvas	25.2 × 15.9 cm	National Gallery of Art	
1866		Woman by a Fence	Oil on canvas	25 × 16.1 cm	National Gallery of Art	
1866		Woman in a Park	Oil on canvas	26.1 × 16.1 cm	National Gallery of Art	
1866		Landscape with Two People (Paysage avec deux personnages)	Oil on canvas	Unknown	Only a fragment of the painting survives, depicting just the seated woman with the title of Woman with Bird (La Dame a l'oiseau). The top right corner portion is presumed missing or destroyed. The image here is a closeup of Renoir's painting displayed within Bazille's painting, Bazille's Studio (1870).	
1866		Woman with Bird (Lise: La Fille a l'Oaseau)	Oil on canvas	81 × 65 cm	Nizhny Novgorod State Art Museum	
1867–68		Lise Sewing	Oil on canvas	55.9 × 45.7 cm	Dallas Museum of Art	
1867		Diana	Oil on canvas	197 × 132 cm	National Gallery of Art	
1867		Portrait of Lise (Lise holding a bouquet of wild flowers)	Oil on canvas	65.2 × 50.3 cm	Private collection	
1867		Lise with a Parasol	Oil on canvas	184 × 115 cm	Museum Folkwang	
1868		Woman in a Meadow	Oil on canvas	29 × 34.5 cm	Ordrupgaard	
1868		Woman in a Garden	Oil on canvas	105.5 × 73.4 cm	Kunstmuseum Basel	
1868		A Couple (Les Fiancés)	Oil on canvas	105 × 75 cm	Wallraf-Richartz Museum	
1868		In Summer: Study	Oil on canvas	85 × 59 cm	Alte Nationalgalerie	
1869–70		A Nymph by a Stream	Oil on canvas	66.5 × 124 cm	National Gallery, London	
1869–70		La Toilette	Oil on canvas	132 × 127 cm	Musée Fabre	
1870		Bather with a Griffon Dog	Oil on canvas	184 × 115 cm	São Paulo Museum of Art	
1870		Woman of Algiers (Odalisque)	Oil on canvas	69.2 × 122.6 cm	National Gallery of Art	
1870		Jeune femme dans une barque (La Barque)	Oil on canvas	29.5 × 33.2 cm	Private collection	
1870		La Promenade	Oil on canvas	81.3 × 65 cm	Getty Center	
1871		Woman with Parakeet	Oil on canvas	92.1 × 65.1 cm	Solomon R. Guggenheim Museum	
1871–72		Lise in a White Shawl	Oil on canvas	56 × 46 cm	Dallas Museum of Art	
1871–72		Femme demi-nue couchée (Reclining Nude)	Oil on canvas	29.5 × 25 cm	Musée d'Orsay	
1872		Woman with Parasol Seated in the Garden	Oil on canvas	46 × 37.9 cm	Private collection	
1872		Parisian Women in Algerian Costume (The Harem)	Oil on canvas	156 cm × 129 cm	National Museum of Western Art	

== See also ==
- List of paintings by Pierre-Auguste Renoir
