= La Promenade (Renoir) =

1870 painting by Pierre-Auguste Renoir

- Artist: Pierre-Auguste Renoir
- Year: 1870
- Medium: Oil on canvas
- Dimensions: 81.3 cm × 65 cm (32.0 in × 26 in)
- Location: J. Paul Getty Museum

La Promenade is an oil on canvas, early Impressionist painting by the French artist Pierre-Auguste Renoir, created in 1870. The work depicts a young couple on an excursion outside of the city, walking on a path through a woodland. Influenced by the Rococo Revival style during the Second Empire, Renoir's La Promenade reflects the older style and themes of eighteenth-century artists like Jean-Honoré Fragonard and Jean-Antoine Watteau. The work also shows the influence of Claude Monet on Renoir's new approach to painting.

== Background ==
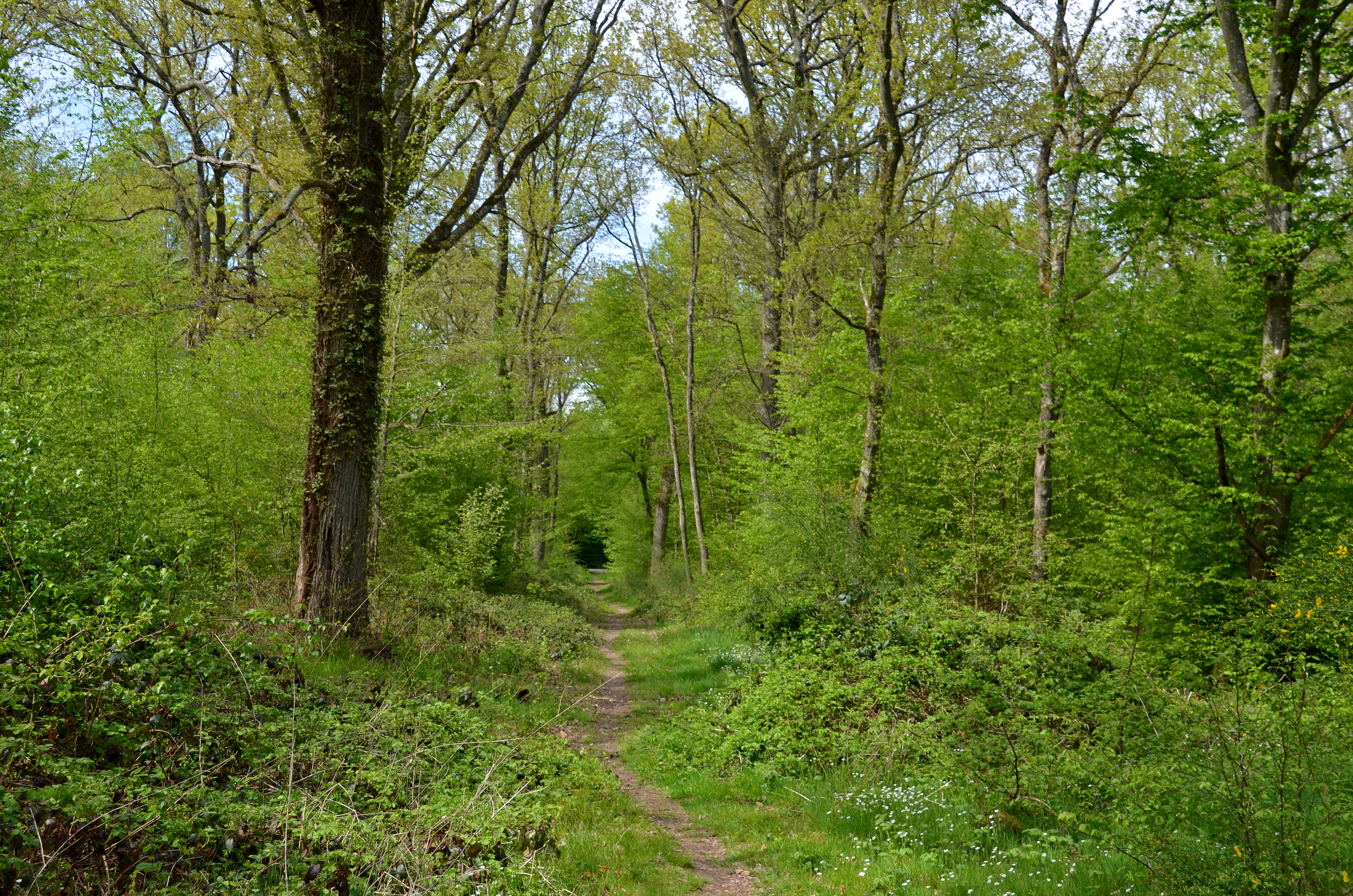
Fontainebleau in the spring

The forest was a popular landscape subject for nineteenth-century French artists, particularly the forest of Fontainebleau. Before Renoir, Claude Monet (1840–1926) painted Bazille and Camille (Study for "Déjeuner sur l'Herbe") (1865), showing a couple together in the forest. In 1869, Renoir and Monet spent time painting together at La Grenouillère. By 1870, Renoir was living in Louveciennes with his mother. Throughout this decade, the eighteenth-century rococo art movement was back in style and Renoir embraced it. France declared war against Germany on 19 July 1870, starting the Franco-Prussian War. Renoir was conscripted and served four months in the cavalry but never saw combat.

== Description ==
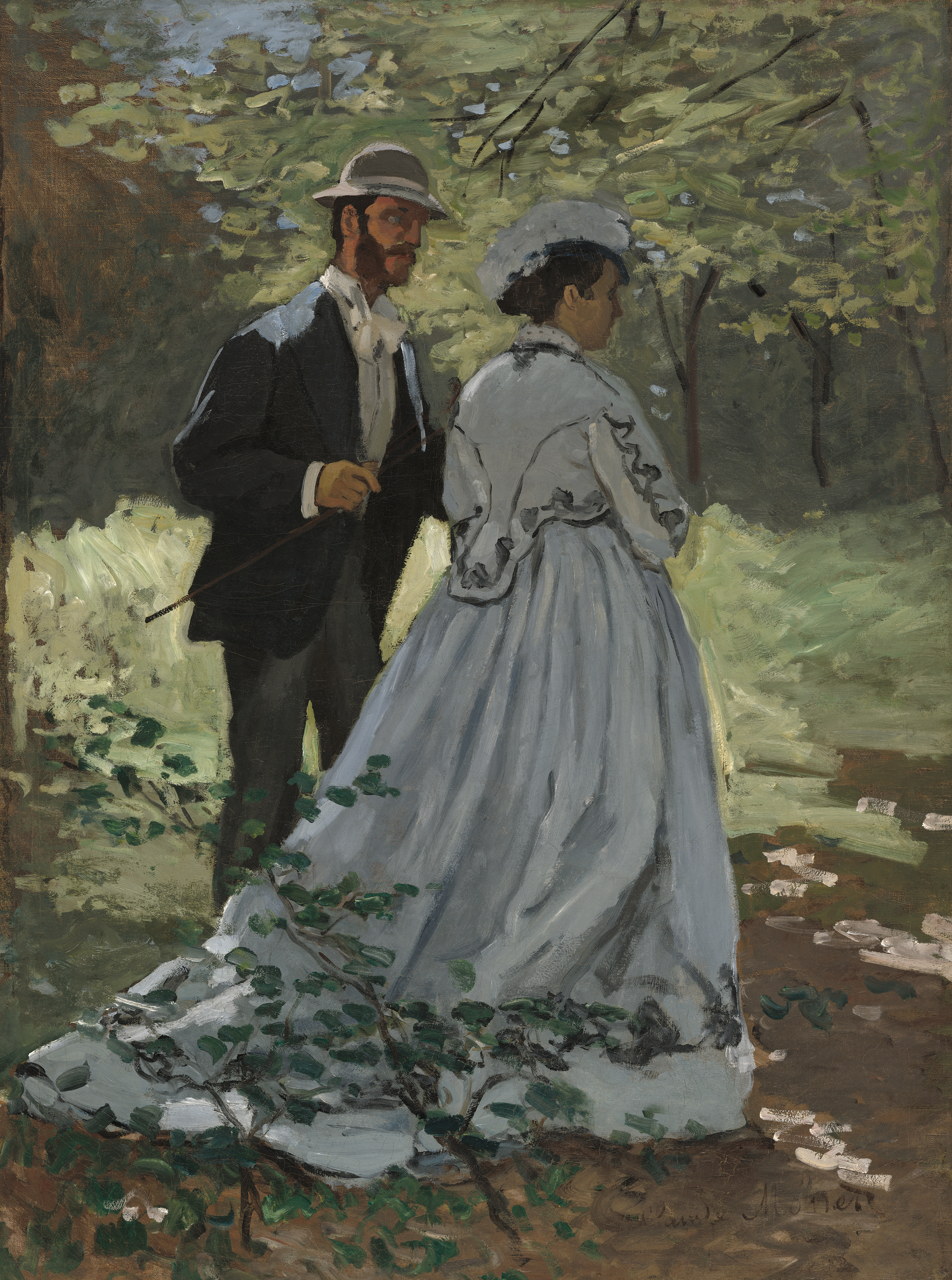
Bazille and Camille (Study for "Déjeuner sur l'Herbe") (1865), Claude Monet

A young man, possibly a canotier (boatman) given his distinctive boater hat, holds the hand of a young woman on a path surrounded by bushes, perhaps on the banks of the Seine, with the implication of an upcoming intimate encounter. The image of lovers walking through a woodland is based on a popular rococo theme. Interpretations of the figure models vary. It is generally believed that the model for the woman in La Promenade was Lise Tréhot, Renoir's favorite model and companion during his early Salon period. In the past, it was believed that the man in the painting was landscape painter Alfred Sisley (1839–1899) and the woman was Rapha, a companion of musician Edmond Maître (1840–1898).

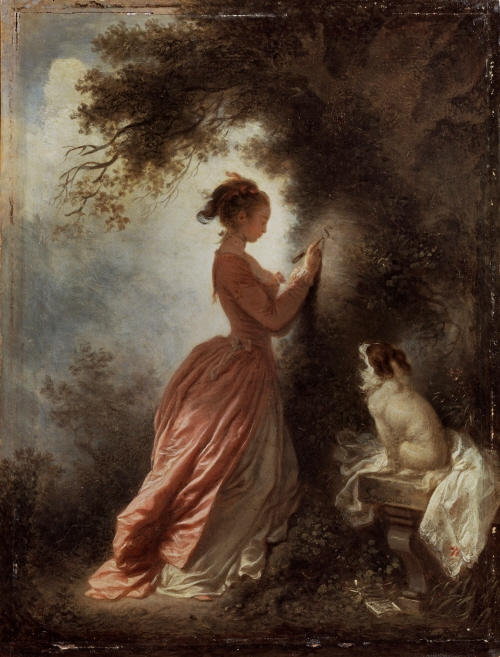
The Souvenir (1775–1778), Jean-Honoré Fragonard

The original title of the painting is unknown. It first received the title La Promenade by unnamed owners of the work when it was put up for sale in 1898. It was not until 1941 that questions about the original title came to light. Renoir was known to strenuously object to sentimental titles applied by others to his work. "Why have they given names to my pictures which never represent the reason I painted such and such a subject? My joy consists in painting, and it has never been in my mind to paint a preconceived subject", Renoir said in his later years. However, Renoir did exhibit a painting with the title of La Promenade in 1876, but that work is now known as Mother and Children.

== Critical reception ==
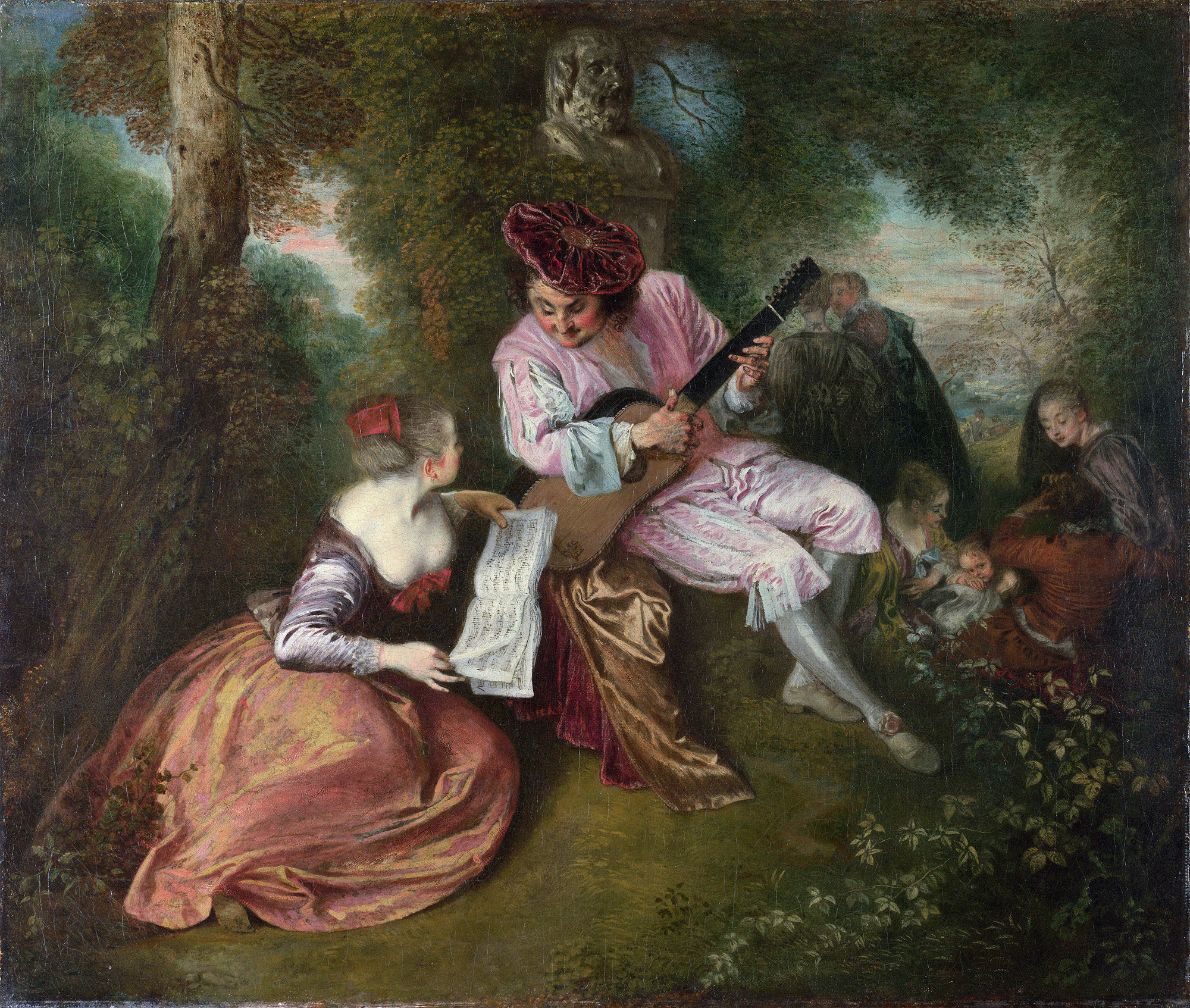
The Love Song (1717), Jean-Antoine Watteau

In a commentary for the exhibition Origins of Impressionism (1994–95), Henri Loyrette writes that La Promenade "succeeds at last in what Renoir had for so long and so vainly sought: the integration of the figure in a landscape". Loyrette notes the influence of Monet in La Promenade and the change in Renoir's style since Les Fiancés (1868). The Impressionist influence on Renoir, Perrin Stein writes, led to his increasing use of the high-key palette. Renoir's "lightness and delicacy of touch" here is, according to art historian John House, reminiscent of rococo artist Jean-Honoré Fragonard (1732–1806). Critics also view the influence of Jean-Antoine Watteau (1684–1721) on this work, particularly in Renoir's use of the intimate couple in the woods, a motif popularized in scenes found in Watteau's fête galante genre.

== Other work ==
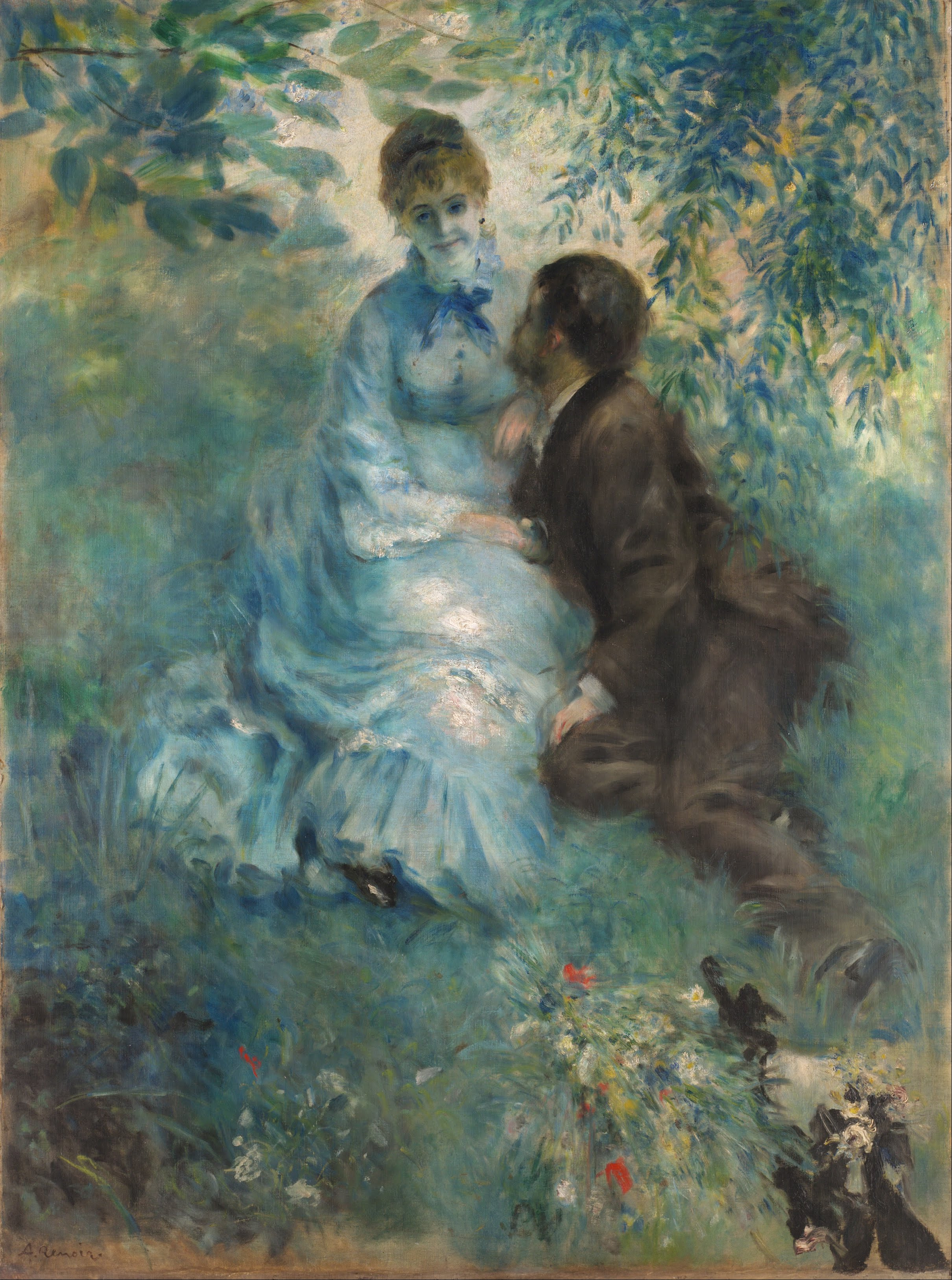
The Lovers (1875)

In addition to La Promenade, Renoir explored rococo themes in several subsequent works including The Lovers (1875) and Confidences (1878). In 1883, Renoir created a drawing titled Couple on a Hillside for the French literary review La Vie Moderne based on a variation of La Promenade a decade earlier, but redesigned to show different angles and positions of the original figures.

== Provenance ==
John Walsh, American art historian and former director of the J. Paul Getty Museum, is credited with helping acquire La Promenade for the Getty collection in 1989.

- Gustave Goupy
- Paul Durand-Ruel
- Paul Cassirer
- Bernhard Köhler
- Paul Rosenberg
- Nate B. and Frances Spingold
- Seito
- British Rail Pension Trustee Company, Ltd.

== See also ==
- List of paintings by Pierre-Auguste Renoir
