= Madame Clémentine Valensi Stora (L'Algérienne) =

1870 painting by Pierre-Auguste Renoir

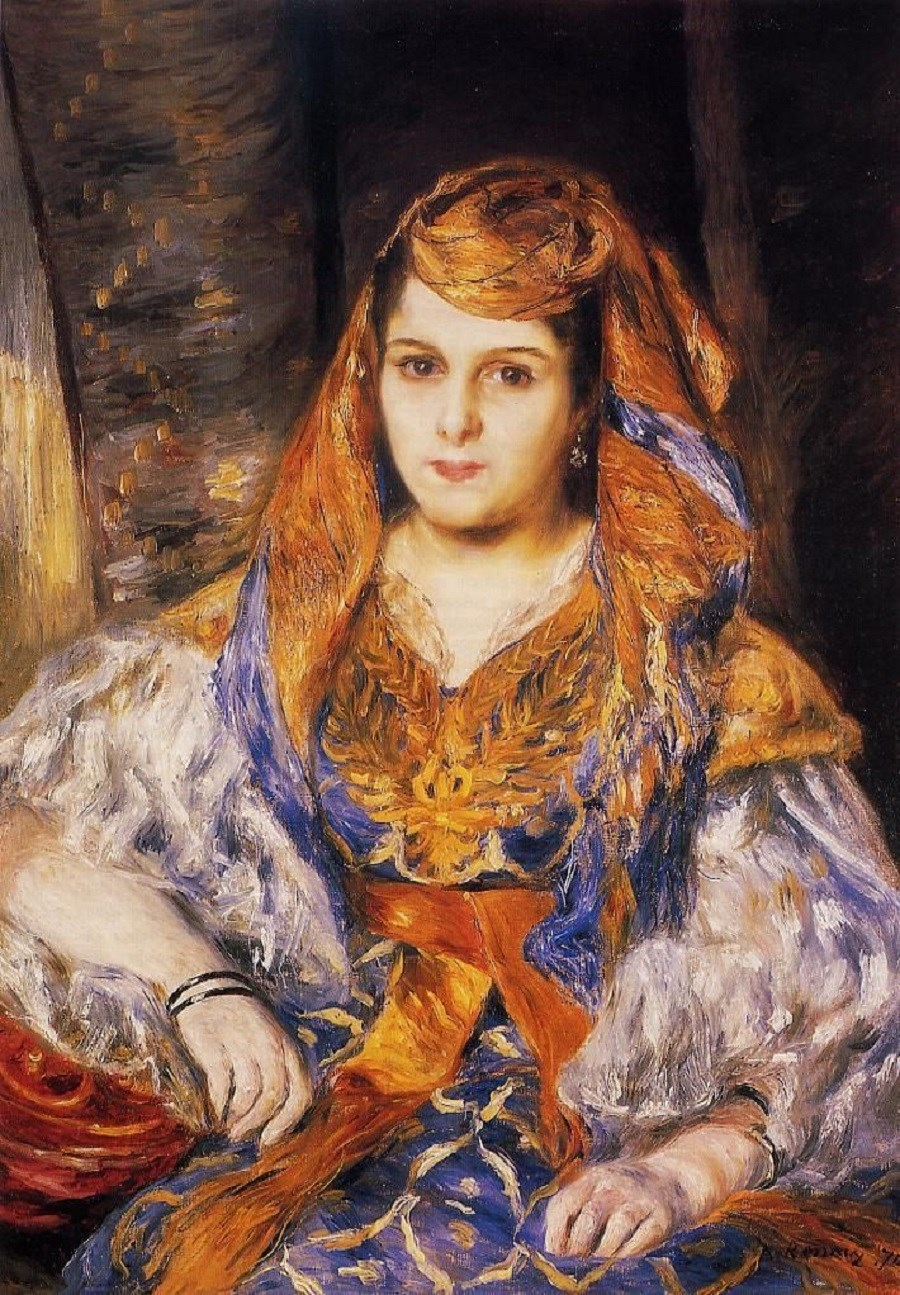
- Artist: Pierre-Auguste Renoir
- Year: 1870
- Medium: Oil on canvas
- Dimensions: 84 cm × 58 cm (33 in × 23 in)
- Location: Fine Arts Museum of San Francisco

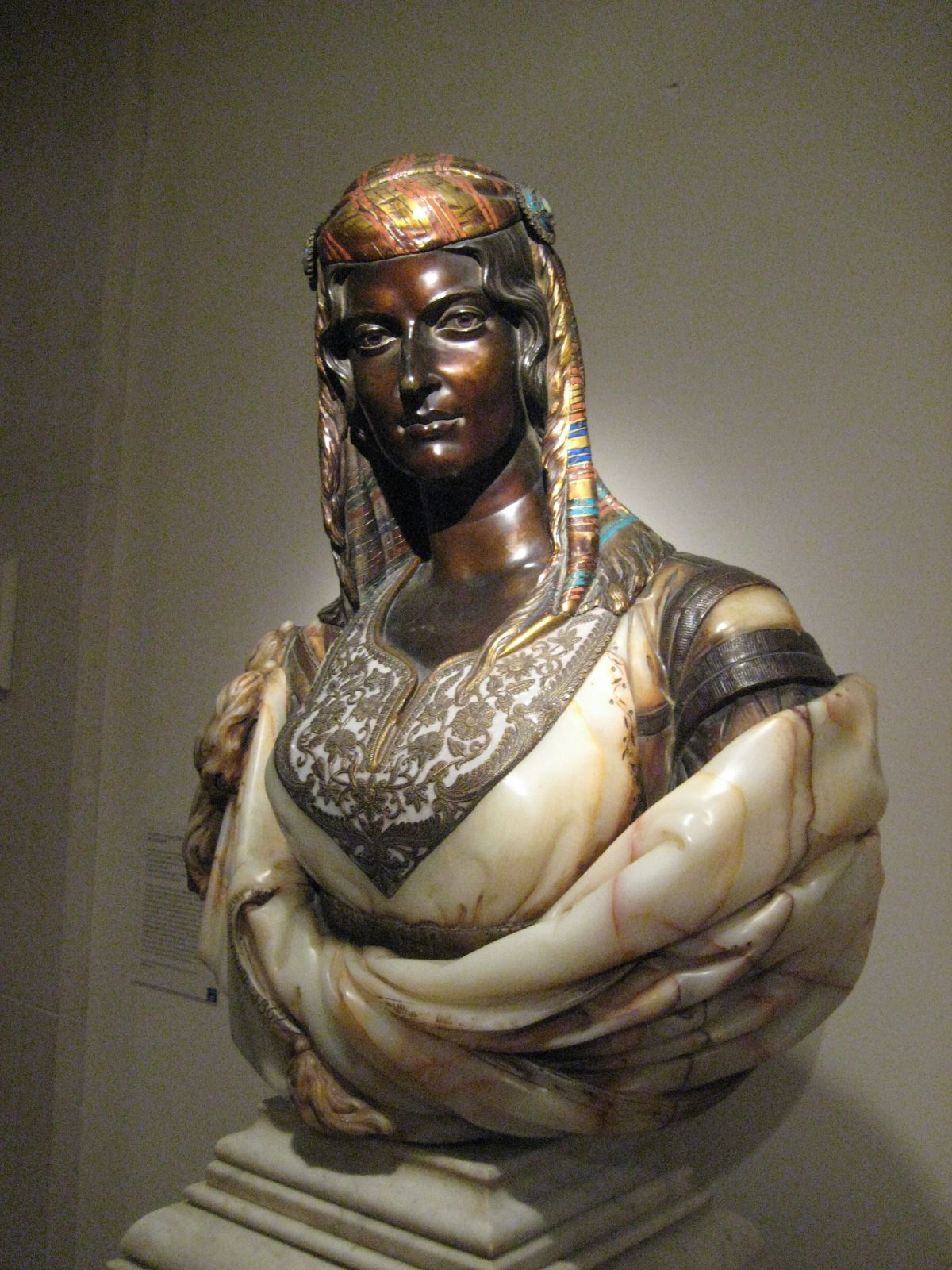
Charles Cordier, The Jewish Woman of Algiers, 1862. Bronze, enamel, onyx. Metropolitan Museum of Art, New York.

Madame Clémentine Valensi Stora (L'Algérienne) is an oil painting by Pierre-Auguste Renoir, completed in 1870, and now in the Fine Arts Museum of San Francisco. It depicts a young Jewish woman, Rebecca Clémentine Stora, in Algerian costume and is untypical of Renoir's work, leading to debate about the place of the painting within his oeuvre. Renoir and Stora both later repudiated the work.

== Background ==
Pierre-Auguste Renoir was closely associated with the Impressionist movement and the painting of modern life in France in the mid-nineteenth century. L'Algérienne is untypical of his output in depicting a named living subject in an oriental costume. Renoir did create a number of Orientalist works including Woman of Algiers ("Odalisque") (1870) and Parisian Women in Algerian Costume (The Harem) (1872), however, both were homages to existing works rather than portraits of living people, Ingres' Grande Odalisque (1814, Louvre) in the first case and Delacroix's Women of Algiers in their Apartment (1834, Louvre) in the second. Renoir did not travel abroad until 1881 when he visited Algeria.

== Style ==
L'Algérienne has been described by Colin Bailey as "proto-Impressionist". The broad brush strokes and exuberant use of colour represent a high point in Renoir's temporary rejection of the realism of Gustave Courbet and Édouard Manet in favour of the influence of his hero Delacroix. Later, when his style had changed considerably, Renoir repudiated the work, complaining in connection with it, "la manie des amateurs de toujours demander ma manière ancienne".

== Subject ==
The painting depicts a young Sephardic Jewish woman, Rebecca Clémentine Stora, née Valensi (or Valensin), in Algerian costume. Clémentine Valensi was born in Algiers on 24 April 1851 and died in July 1917. She was the daughter of a maker of travel goods. The Stora and Valensi families moved to Paris in the late 1860s when there was growing anti-Semitic feeling in their native Algeria. Clémentine married Nathan Stora in Paris in 1868. He was an antiques dealer who specialised in goods from North Africa and had a shop at 24 Boulevard des Italiens named Au Pacha which later moved to the fashionable boulevard Hausmann. The tourist trade with French Algeria created a strong market for Algerian and North African themed material in France and the business claimed to be suppliers to the Government General of Algeria.

Research using contemporary photographs has shown that the costume worn by Clémentine in the picture is authentic for a Jewish Algerian woman of her era. Comparisons have also been made with Charles Cordier's bust The Jewish Woman of Algiers, which was shown at the Salon of 1863 and the Exposition Universelle of 1867, and which depicts a woman in a similar costume. The costume was not, however, conventional for 1870s Paris and it is unclear whether the choice of an Algerian theme was an attempt at ethnic authenticity by Renoir or a demand of the Storas. Clémentine's pursed expression seems to indicate that she is not entirely happy with something. If it was the costume, that did not stop her depiction in similar form in 1877 by Brochart. The authenticity of the clothes and the fact that the painting is a portrait of a named living person rules out the idea that the picture is a work of oriental fantasy and places it more in the realm of conventional portraiture, however, questions remain about what Renoir and the Storas were trying to achieve in the work.

Clémentine was depicted twice more in art, in an oil painting by Constant-Joseph Brochart from about 1877 and in a pastel drawing, also by Brochart, from around 1880. In the first she is shown with her daughter Semha Lucie Stora, the third of Clémentine's four children, in an oriental fantasy scene on a terrace overlooking an imaginary city. Her husband's specialism in oriental carpets is referenced by the carpet in the picture. That painting was sold by Christie's in 2007. In the second depiction, Clémentine is shown in conventional European dress for a woman of her class with no evidence of her Jewish Algerian roots. Unlike L'Algérienne, both of the Brochart portraits remained in the Stora family until after 2000.

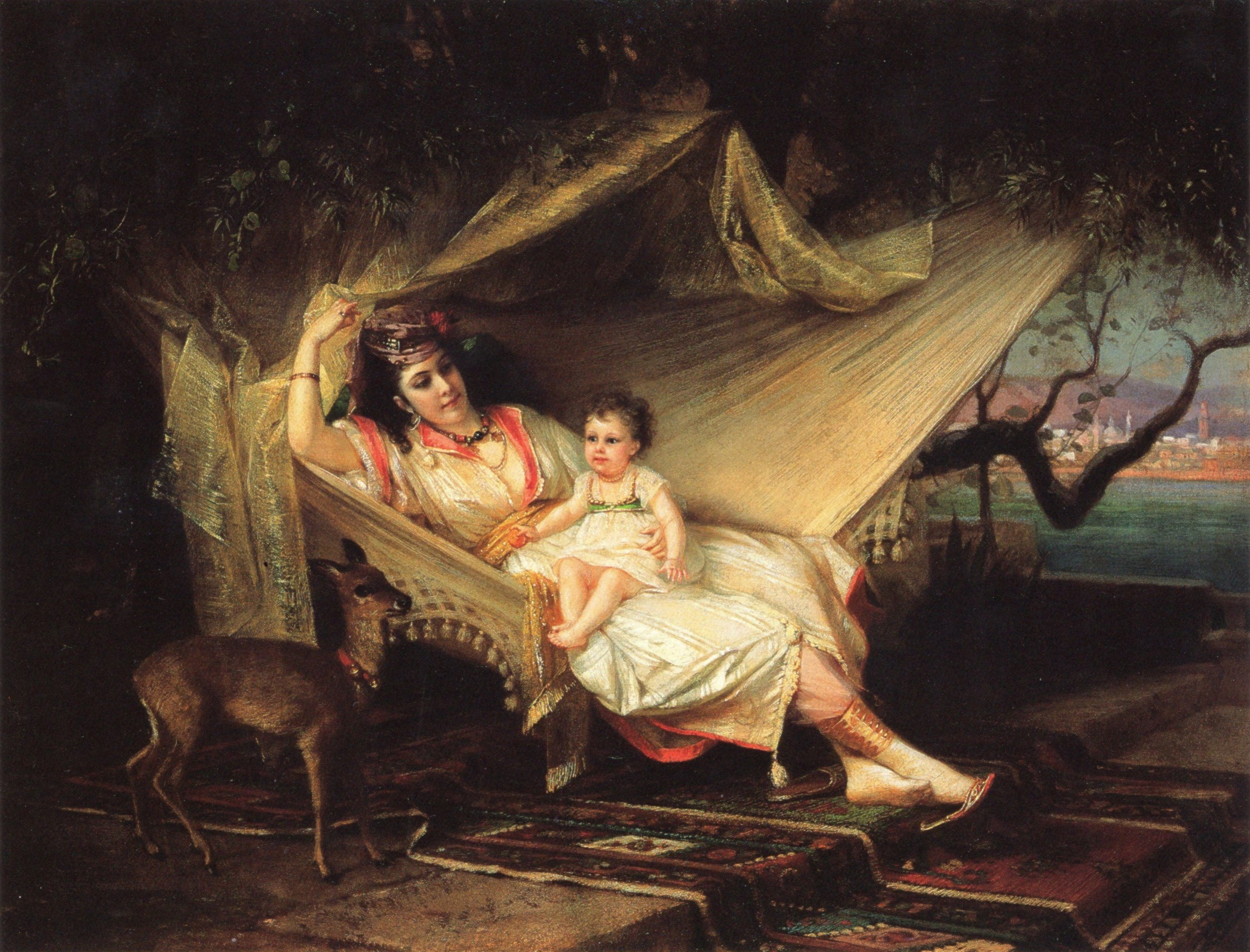
Constant-Joseph Brochart, Clémentine Stora and her Daughter Lucie, c. 1877. Oil on canvas. Location unknown.

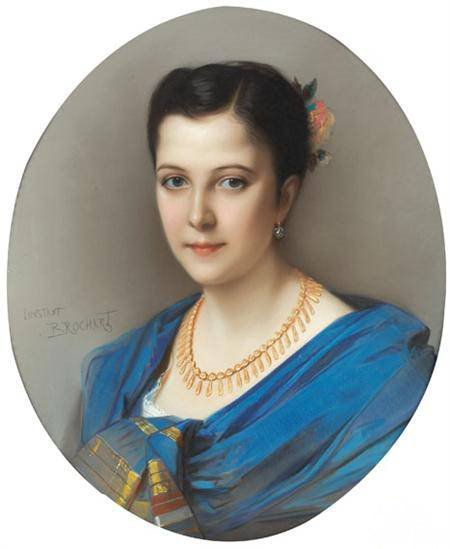
Constant-Joseph Brochart, Clémentine Stora, c. 1880. Pastel. Private collection, New York.

== Provenance ==
Clémentine Stora disliked the painting, describing it as "horrible". Around 1893, she sold it to portraitist Paul Helleu for the modest sum of 300 francs despite the high prices then being realised for Renoir's work. Helleu in turn sold it to Claude Monet sometime before 1906. It was shown at the Orientalistes Francais exhibition in Paris in 1906 by Monet. It was inherited by Michael Monet in 1926 and was at the Galerie Bernheim-Jeune, Paris, by 1938 followed by Reid and Lefevre and William Hallsborough Ltd., London, by 1952. The last private owner was Prentice Cobb Hale of San Francisco.

Today, the painting is part of the collection of the Fine Arts Museum of San Francisco, the gift of Mr and Mrs Prentice Cobb Hale in honour of Thomas Carr Howe Jr., 1966.

== See also ==
- List of paintings by Pierre-Auguste Renoir
