= Brochart =

Brochart is a surname. Notable people with the surname include:

- Constant-Joseph Brochart (1816–1889), French artist
- Paul Brochart (1899–1971), Belgian sprinter
