= Woman with Parakeet (Renoir) =

Painting by Pierre-Auguste Renoir

- La Femme à la perruche
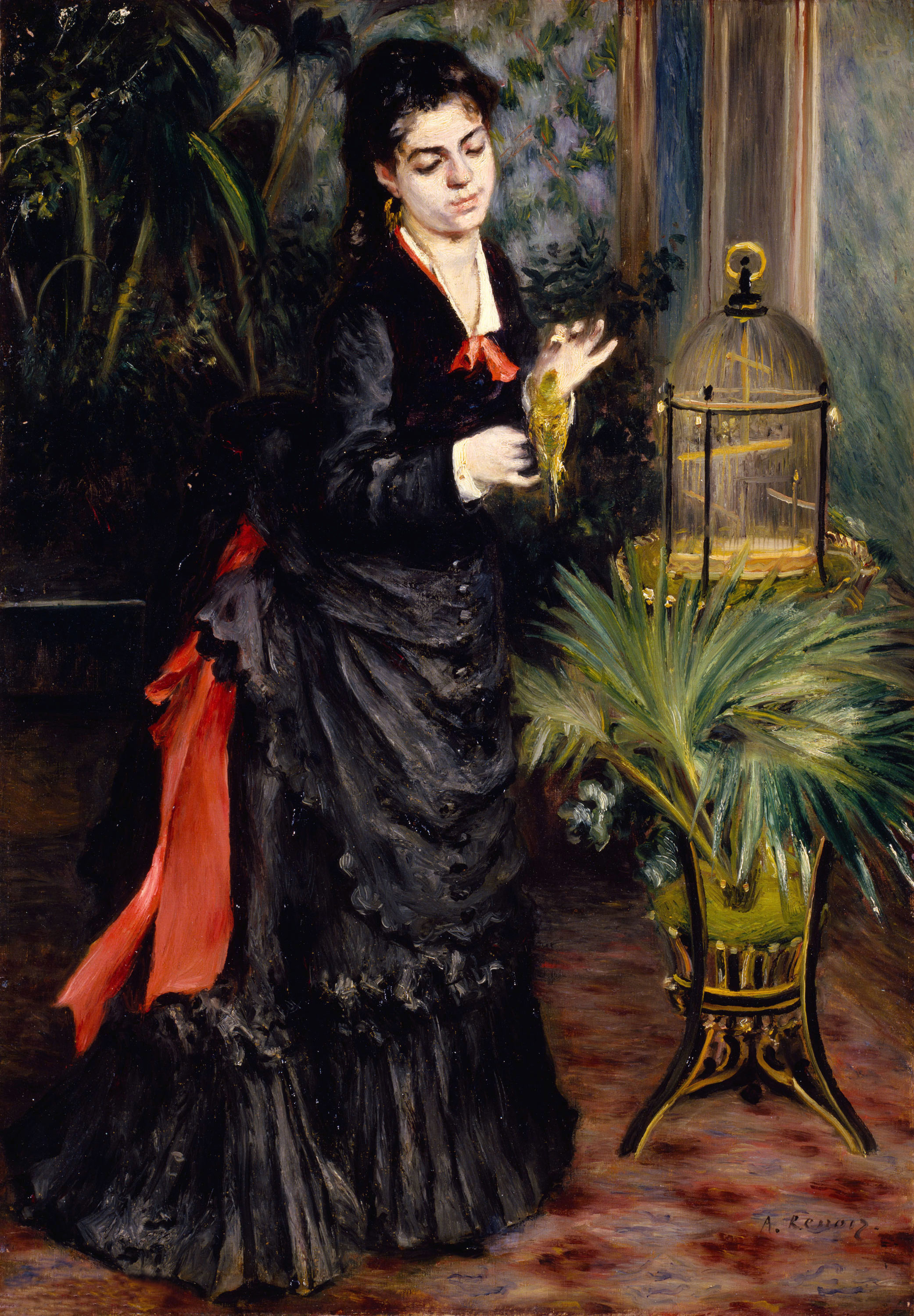
- Artist: Pierre-Auguste Renoir
- Year: 1871
- Medium: Oil on Canvas
- Dimensions: 92.1 cm × 65.1 cm (36.3 in × 25.6 in)
- Location: Solomon R. Guggenheim Museum, New York City

Woman with Parakeet (French: La Femme à la perruche) is a painting by Pierre-Auguste Renoir created in 1871. It is in the holdings of the Solomon R. Guggenheim Museum in New York as part of the Thannhauser Collection. The painting portrays model Lise Tréhot, who posed for Renoir in over twenty paintings during the years 1866 to 1872.

== Context ==
Though the painting's date of creation has been a subject of debate, it is now agreed that Woman with Parakeet was created after Renoir returned from serving in the Franco-Prussian War, and likely after the events of the Paris Commune in 1871. Previous publications dated the painting to 1865. In 1912, in a letter to Joseph Durand-Ruel, Renoir identified the painting as an image of Lise Tréhot created "no later than 1871."

Woman with Parakeet was never exhibited in the Paris Salon. In 1871, the year the work was painted, there was no Salon Exhibition due to the Franco-Prussian War. In 1872, Renoir's submission Parisian Women in Algerian Costume was rejected.

== Subject ==
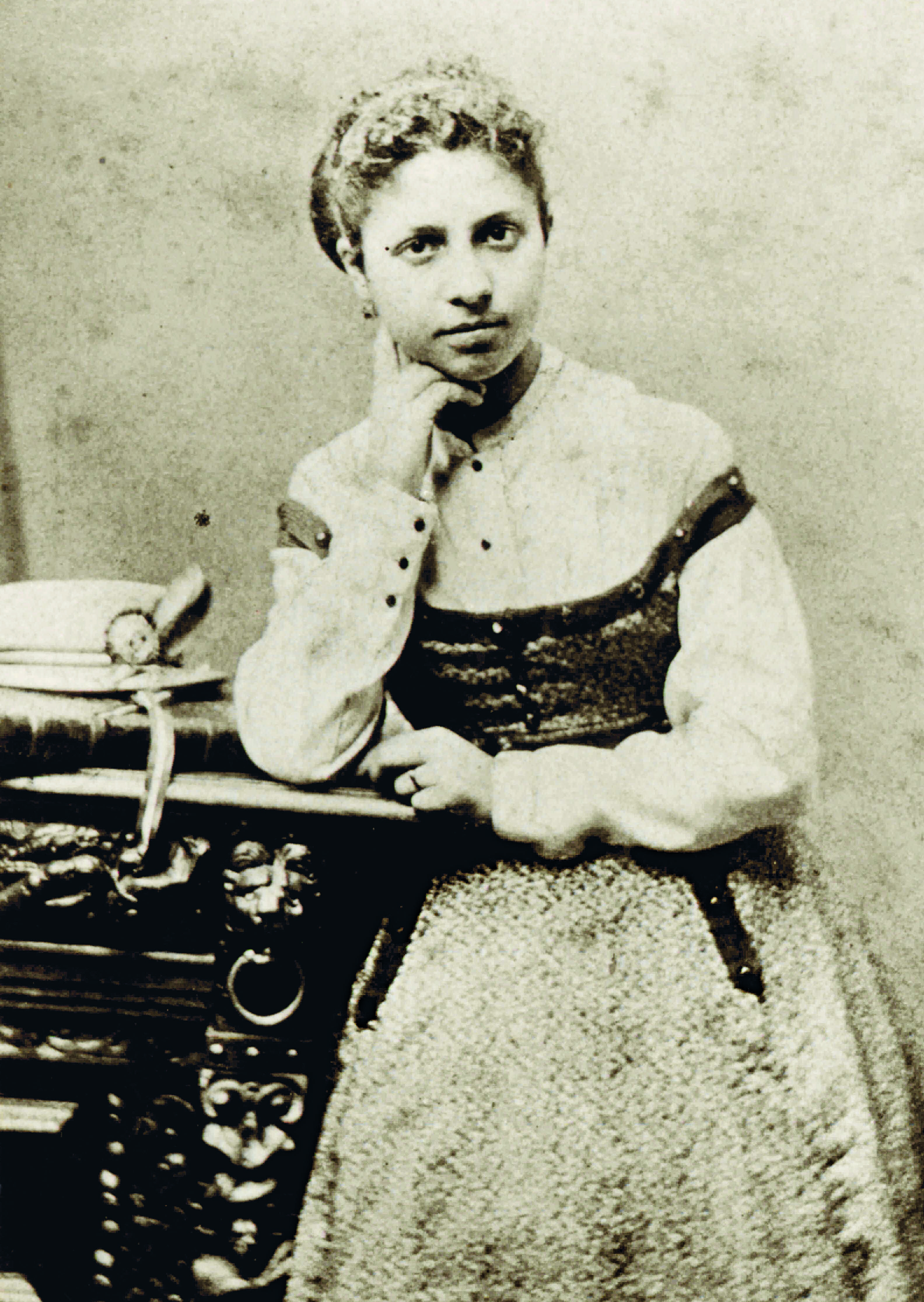
Lise Tréhot, model for Woman with Parakeet, in 1864

Woman with Parakeet is believed to be one of the final paintings depicting Renoir's close companion Lise Tréhot before the model ended her relationship with Renoir and married the architect Georges Brière de L'Isle. Lise's black taffeta dress with white cuffs and a red sash is likely the same dress worn by the model in Lise in a White Shawl. The room depicted in the painting displays typical interior design of the Third Republic, characterized by dark heavy colors and greenery.

Throughout the history of art, countless images of women with birds have foregrounded the intimacy and emotional bond between human and animal. The subject of a woman with a parrot or parakeet was particularly common in paintings during this period of time. In many cases, this imagery is symbolic in nature, at times referencing the woman as vacuous and mimicking others, or carrying erotic connotations that relate the caged bird to the caged woman. This subject matter previously appeared in works by artists Gustave Courbet and Édouard Manet.

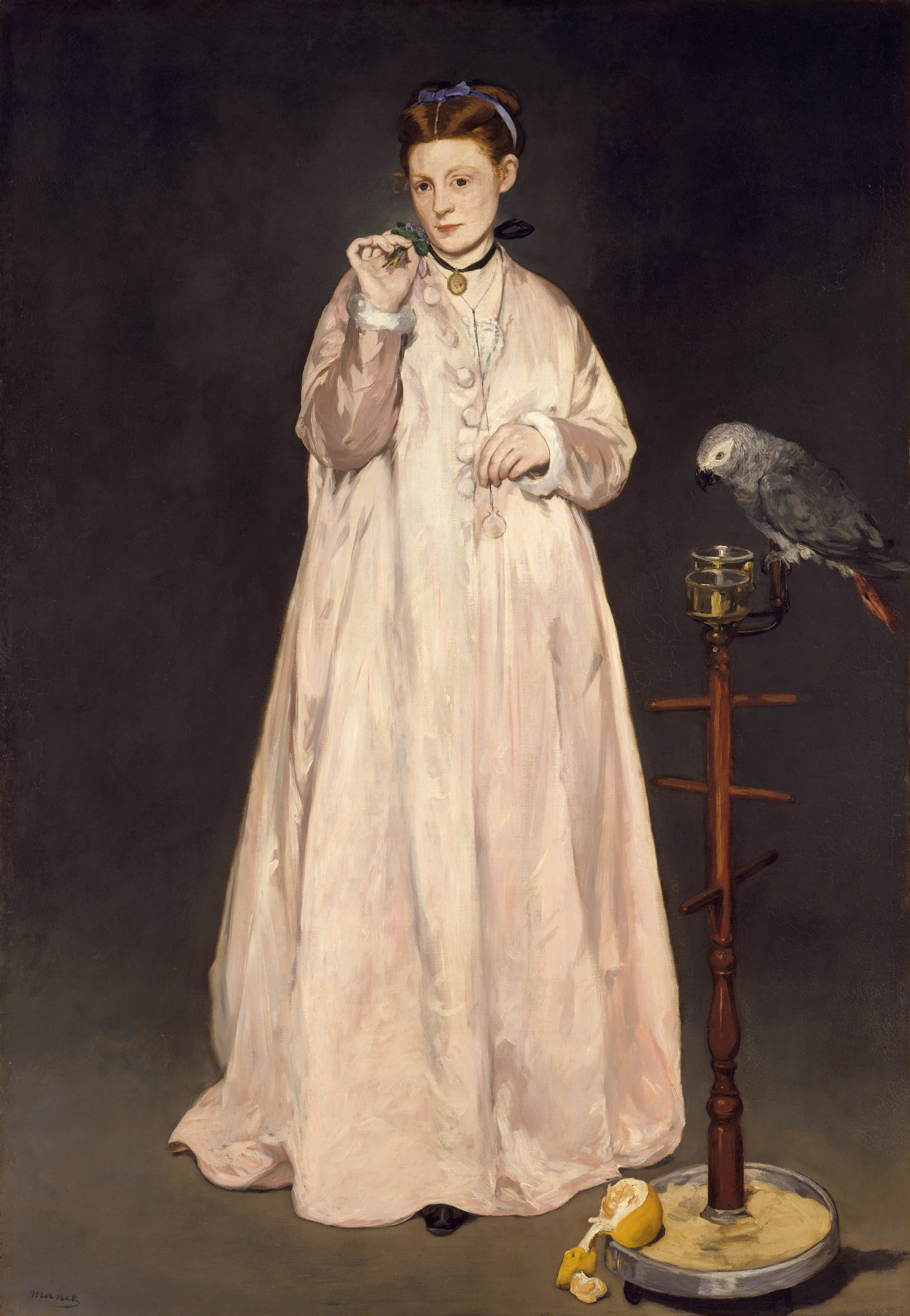
Édouard Manet's Young Lady in 1866, a contemporary painting of similar subject manner

In Woman with Parakeet, however, the analogy between the woman and her pet bird is comparatively understated. The rich yet stifling interior restricts the model's space, like that of the parakeet when confined to its gilded cage. The model's elaborate, ruffled dress and its bright red "plumage" resonate visually with the bird's own brightly colored feathers. The parakeet might also be characterized as playing the traditional role of confidant to the woman. Unlike the other artists, Renoir's subject is placed in a realistically modern setting and his model is unpretentious in her looks and dress.

This work is considered an early work of Impressionism, characterized by the broad, loosely-handled painting technique.

== Provenance ==
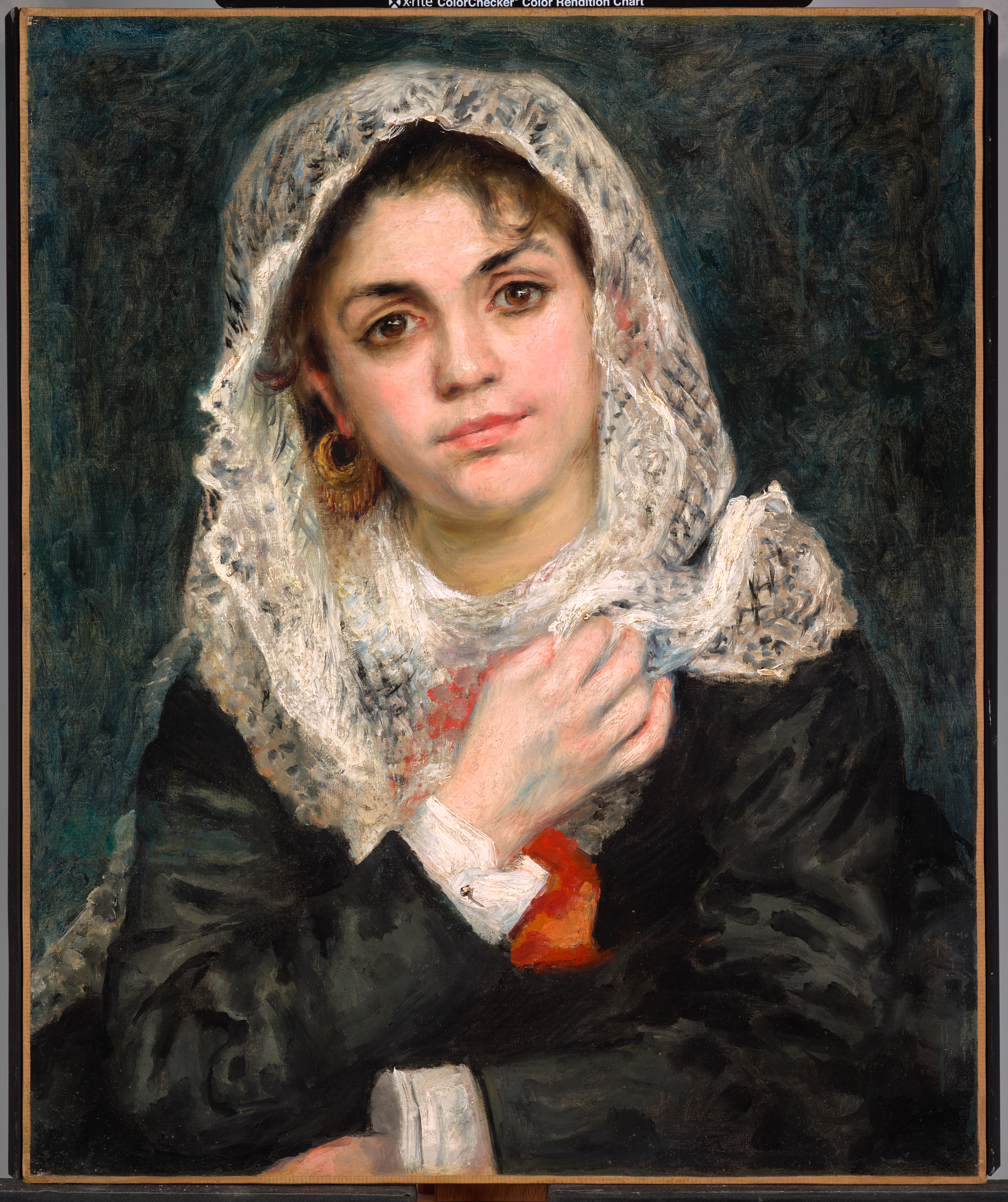
Pierre-Auguste Renoir's Lise in a White Shawl, another portrait of Tréhot in what is likely the same dress

Since 1978, Woman with Parakeet has been in the collection of the Solomon R. Guggenheim Museum and has been on semi-permanent view in the museum's Thannhauser Gallery. The painting was donated to the museum by collector-dealer Justin K. Thannhauser and exists as part of the Thannhauser Collection. Ambroise Vollard, an art dealer and personal friend of Renoir, was likely the first possessor of the painting. After a succession of subsequent owners, Woman with Parakeet was acquired by the Galerien Thannhauser (Justin K. Thannhauser, proprietor) in 1927.

== See also ==
- List of paintings by Pierre-Auguste Renoir
