= Bather with a Griffon Dog =

Painting by Pierre-Auguste Renoir

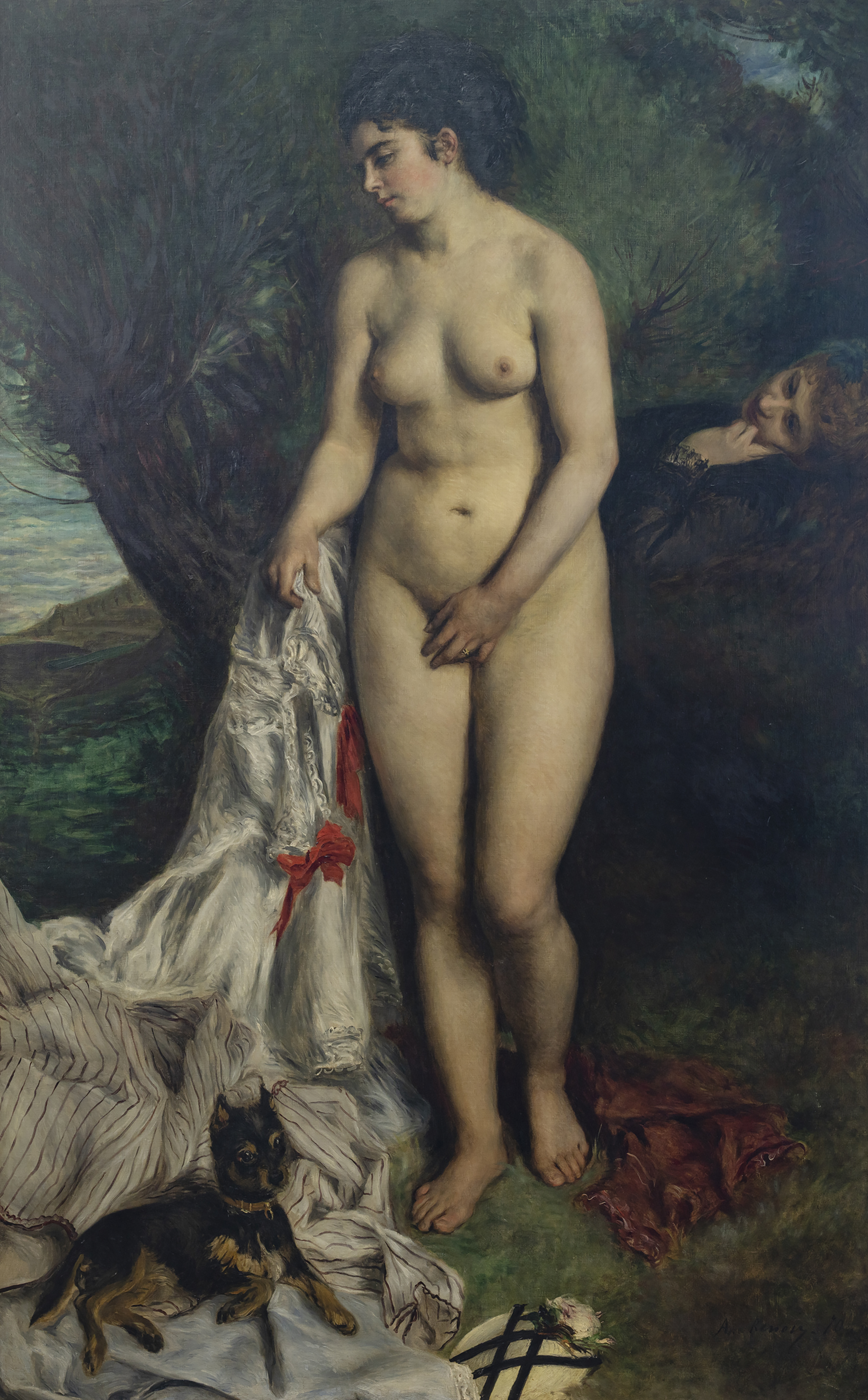
- Artist: Pierre-Auguste Renoir
- Year: 1870
- Medium: Oil on canvas
- Dimensions: 183.5 cm × 115 cm (72.2 in × 45 in)
- Location: São Paulo Museum of Art; São Paulo

Bather with a Griffon Dog is an 1870 oil-on-canvas painting by French artist Pierre-Auguste Renoir. The painting features his lover and model Lise Tréhot (1848–1922). The work was exhibited at the 1870 Salon. The painting is held in the collection of the São Paulo Museum of Art.

== See also ==
- List of paintings by Pierre-Auguste Renoir
