= A Nymph by a Stream =

Painting by Pierre-Auguste Renoir

- Artist: Pierre-Auguste Renoir
- Year: 1869–70
- Medium: Oil on canvas
- Dimensions: 66.5 cm × 124 cm (26.2 in × 49 in)
- Location: National Gallery, London

A Nymph by a Stream is an oil painting of 1869–70 by Pierre-Auguste Renoir which is held in the collection of the National Gallery, London. The painting portrays Renoir's 21-year-old model and lover, Lise Tréhot, who featured in over twenty of his paintings during the years 1866 to 1872.

Unusually, the painting is a combination of a classical depiction of a naiad or river nymph reclining by a stream and the recognisable portrait of an actual person.

== See also ==
- List of paintings by Pierre-Auguste Renoir
