= Diana (Renoir) =

1867 painting by Pierre-Auguste Renoir

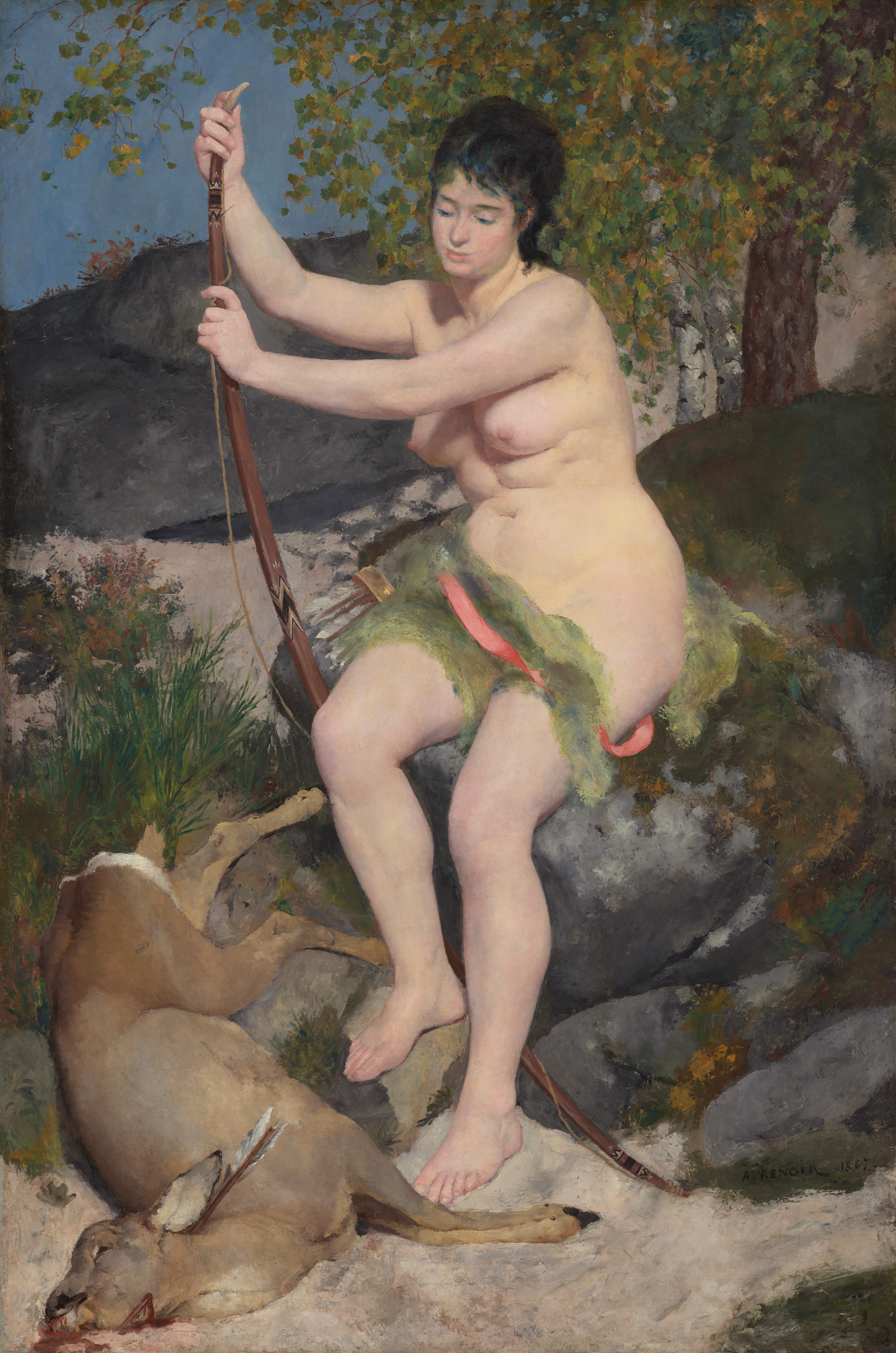
- Artist: Pierre-Auguste Renoir
- Year: 1867
- Medium: Oil on canvas
- Dimensions: 199.5 cm × 129.5 cm (78.5 in × 51.0 in)
- Location: National Gallery of Art, Washington, D.C.

Diana (French: Diane chasseresse, lit. 'Huntress Diana') is a painting from 1867 by the French painter Pierre-Auguste Renoir. It is thought to depict the painter's lover Lise Tréhot as the Roman goddess Diana, although the exact identification of the model in the painting is disputed by art historians.

== Subject and composition ==
The subject is Diana from Roman mythology in her capacity as a huntress. The nude goddess sits on a large stone with her right foot on an elevated perch. Her stretched arms lean on her bow. Below her is a deer with its neck pierced by an arrow.

The painting began as a nude study with a posed model in a studio. It follows the conventions of academic art as typified by the Salon at the time. The model was Renoir's mistress and recurring model Lise Tréhot. According to the painter, he added the attributes of Diana because "the picture was considered pretty improper", and turning it into a mythological subject would make it more acceptable. Details such as the blood coming from the deer's mouth and the moss on the rock's surface, as well as the use of a palette knife to apply paint, show influences from the Realist painter Gustave Courbet. The bright green colours and red accents are however more reminiscent of the Impressionism Renoir would become associated with a few years later.

Although Tréhot is generally accepted to be the model, the art historian Michael F. Zimmermann said in 2012 that it is "probably not" her. Curator Sylvie Patry of the Musée d'Orsay also questions whether Tréhot is the model in the painting.

== Provenance ==
The painting was submitted to the Salon of 1867 but was rejected. Renoir had previously exhibited a painting at the Salon of 1864 although he destroyed it after the exhibition closed. In 1868 his Portrait of Lise was accepted to the Salon of 1868. Diana was in private collections until 1963 when Chester Dale, who had bought it in 1933 from Etienne Bignou, bequeathed it to the National Gallery of Art in Washington, D.C. It is on view in the museum's West Building, Main Floor – Gallery 90.

== Reception ==
Peter H. Feist has called the painting "a beautifully accurate nude, without the coarseness of Courbet's Bathers 14 years before" and "far more healthy and realistic than—as Zola put it—the pampered, lustful nudes, powdered with rice flour, of the fashionable painters of that time".

== See also ==
- List of paintings by Pierre-Auguste Renoir
