= Les Femmes d'Alger =

Painting series by Pablo Picasso

Les Femmes d'Alger (Version O)
- The Women of Algiers (English)
- Artist: Pablo Picasso
- Year: 1955
- Medium: Oil on canvas
- Dimensions: 114 cm × 146.4 cm (45 in × 57.6 in)
- Location: Private collection of Hamad bin Jassim bin Jaber Al Thani, Doha, Qatar

Les Femmes d'Alger (English: Women of Algiers) is a series of 15 paintings and numerous drawings by the Spanish artist Pablo Picasso. The series, created in 1954–1955, was inspired by Eugène Delacroix's 1834 painting The Women of Algiers in their Apartment (French: Femmes d'Alger dans leur appartement). The series is one of several painted by Picasso in tribute to artists that he admired.

The entire series of Les Femmes d'Alger was bought by Victor and Sally Ganz from the Galerie Louise Leiris in Paris for $212,500 in June 1956 (equivalent to $2.5 million in 2025). Ten paintings from the series were later sold by the Ganz's to the Saidenberg Gallery, with the couple keeping versions "C", "H", "K", "M" and "O".

Many of the individual paintings in the series are now in prominent public and private collections.

== Origin ==
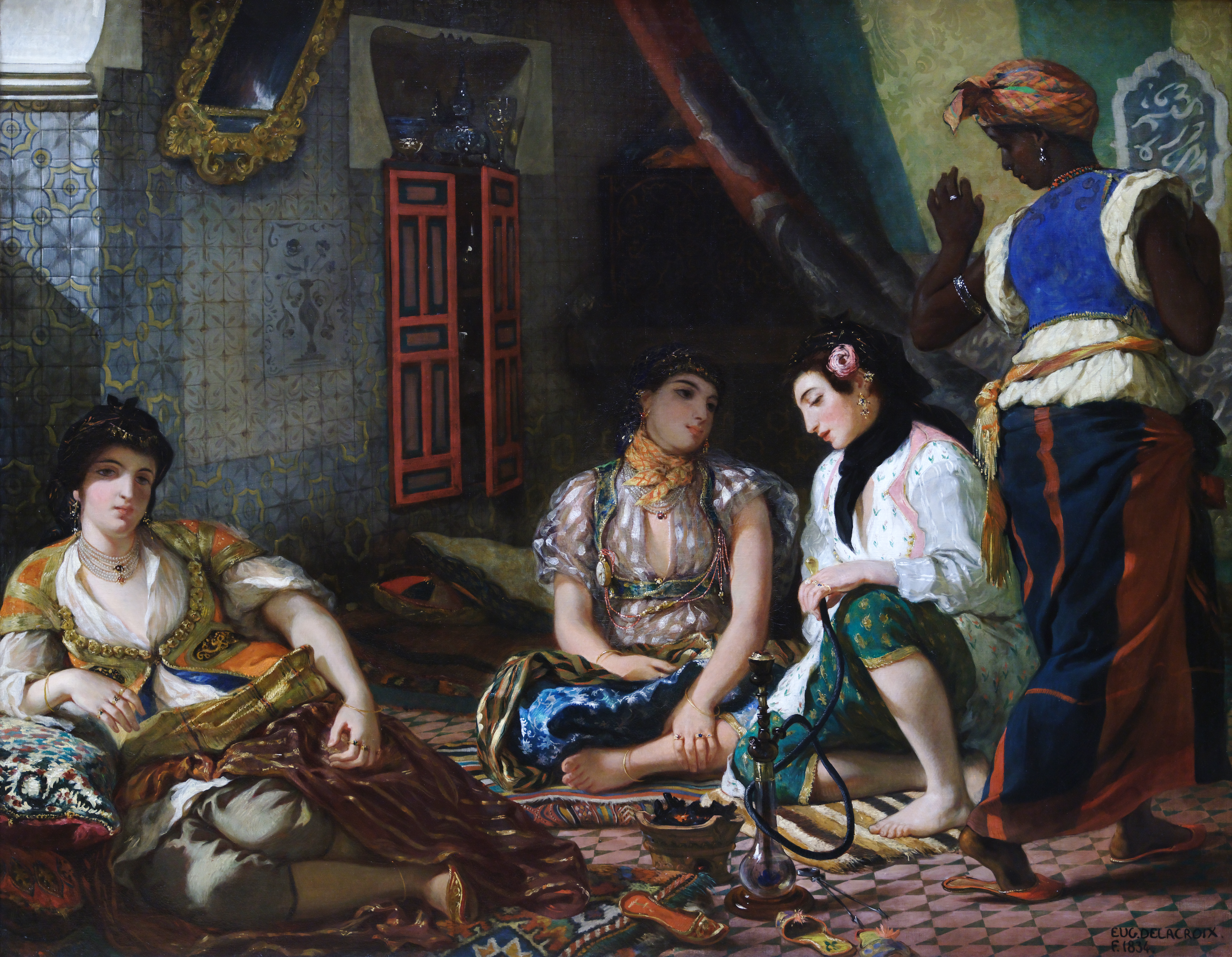
Eugène Delacroix, The Women of Algiers in their Apartment, 1834. Oil on canvas. 180 × 229cm. Louvre, Paris.

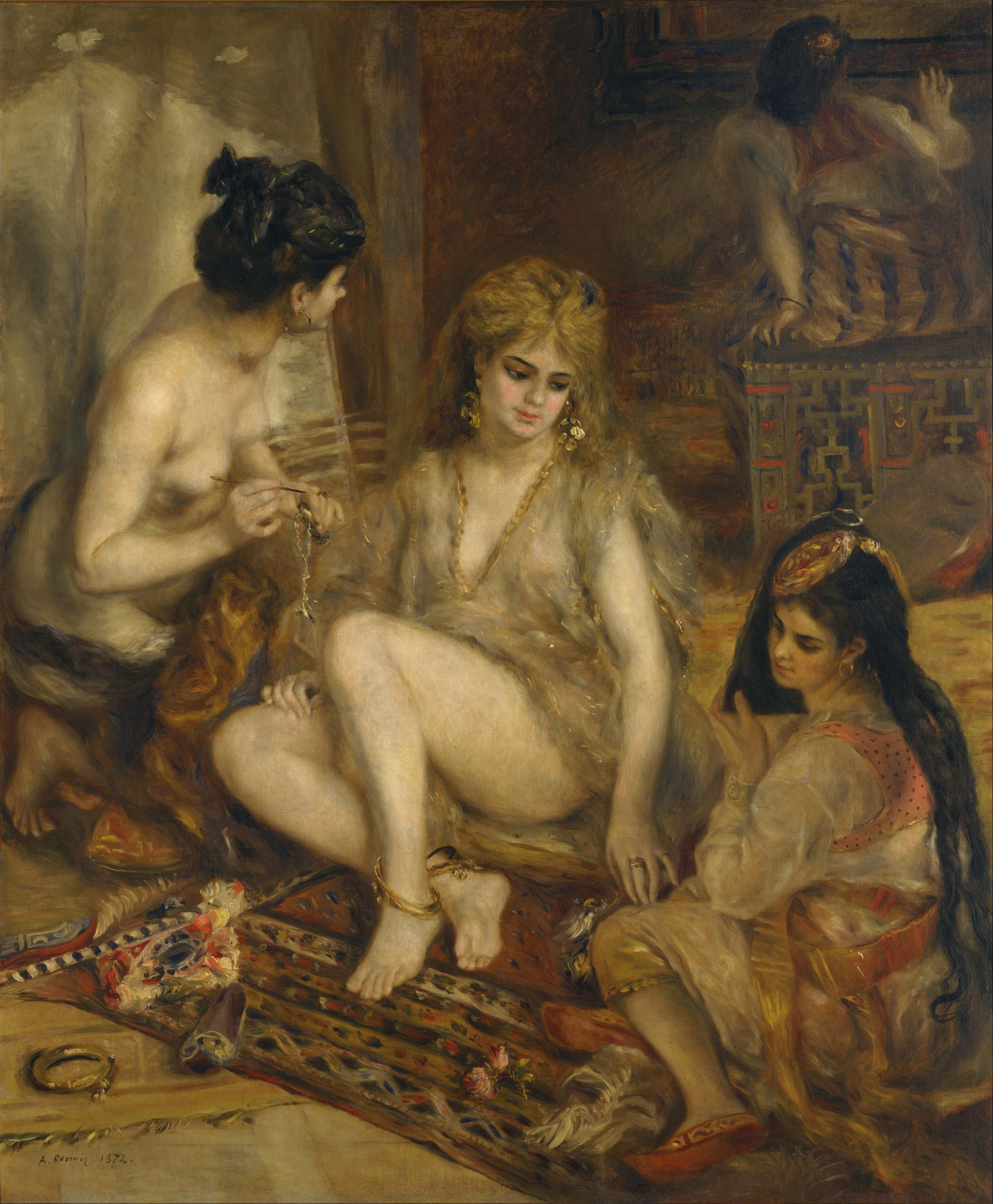
Pierre-Auguste Renoir, Parisiennes in Algerian Costume, 1872. Oil on canvas. 156 × 129cm. National Museum of Western Art, Tokyo. Also inspired by Delacroix's Women of Algiers.

In December 1954, Picasso began to paint a series of free variations on Delacroix's The Women of Algiers in their Apartment (Les Femmes d'Alger). He began his first version (cat. 19) six weeks after learning of the death of his lifelong friend and rival Henri Matisse—and so, for Picasso, the "oriental" subject of this series of paintings held strong associations with Matisse as well as with Delacroix. Matisse had been famous for his images of languid, voluptuous women known as odalisques—the French form of the Turkish word for women in a harem. "When Matisse died he left his odalisques to me as a legacy", joked Picasso. Many of Picasso's portrayals of Jacqueline circa 1955–56 represent her in this guise (cat. 9).

The consequences of Picasso's Femmes d'Alger series were far-reaching: "I thought so much about Les Femmes d'Alger that I bought La Californie", Picasso explained to his biographer Pierre Daix. La Californie is a Belle Époque villa situated in the foothills of Cannes in the South of France, where Picasso spent his last decades. Picasso bought it in 1955, and it was here that he painted the Nude in a Rocking-Chair (cat. 16). The light-filled interiors, the views over the Mediterranean and the exotic garden evoked a feeling of spaciousness and ease which corresponded to Picasso's idea of the Orient.

The art historian and collector Douglas Cooper was perhaps the first to realise that the paintings done at La Californie marked a return to Picasso's peak form. In April 1956, he wrote to the curator Alfred H. Barr Jr.:

I recently spent the day with Picasso and went through most of what he has done since last July. I have been greatly impressed...A whole series of interiors of La Californie deriving half from Delacroix half from Matisse—great emphasis on ornament, arabesque, simplification...In short, as you are planning to come to Europe, this is a word to tell you that you must see all this in the studio: it is to my mind much better than anything since 1946.

== List of notable works ==
=== "Version C" ===
"Version C" was sold in 1988 following Victor Ganz's death.

=== "Version F' ===
"Version F" was completed on 17 February 1955, and later sold to Daniel and Eleanore Saidenberg of the Saidenberg Gallery in 1957. It was subsequently sold to a private collector in 2011. The painting later was sold for $29.22 million on 10 July 2020, as part of the New York leg of the One: A Global Sale of the 20th Century auction of Christie's.

=== "Version H" ===
"Version H" was completed on 24 January 1955, and was in sold for $7.15 million in November 1997, as part of the Ganz collection, at Christie's in New York. It is part of the Nahmad Collection in Switzerland. In May 2015, it was on loan to Tate Liverpool, England.

=== "Version J" ===
"Version J" was sold at Sotheby's in London in 2006 for $18.6 million and is part of the Nahmad Collection.

=== "Version K" ===
"Version K" sold for $6.6 million in November 1997, as part of the Ganz collection, at Christie's in New York.

=== "Version L" ===
"Version L" was bought by the Berggruen Museum in Berlin in 2011 for $21.4 million.

=== "Version M" ===
"Version M" sold for $10 million in November 1997, as part of the Ganz collection, at Christie's in New York.

=== "Version N" ===
"Version N" is held by the Mildred Lane Kemper Art Museum at Washington University in St. Louis, and was bought by the Steinberg Fund, for the university, in 1960.

=== "Version O" ===
"Version O", the final painting in the series, was painted in 1955.

The painting sold for $31.9 million in November 1997, as part of the Ganz collection, at Christie's in New York. Three other versions in the series owned by the Ganz family were also auctioned at the same time. "Version O" was bought, by the British art dealer Libby Howie, for an undisclosed Saudi Arabian collector living in London.

"Version O" was auctioned at Christie's New York for a second time in May 2015, selling for $179.4 million including fees, a record price for a painting at auction. It was bought by the former Qatari prime minister, Hamad bin Jassim bin Jaber Al Thani. The most expensive work of art to previously sell at auction, Francis Bacon's painting Three Studies of Lucian Freud, had sold for $142.4 million in 2013. "Version O" remained the most expensive painting ever sold at auction until it was surpassed by Leonardo da Vinci's Salvator Mundi in November 2017. It maintained the auction-sale record for a 20th-century painting until May 2022, when Andy Warhol's Shot Sage Blue Marilyn sold at Christie's for $195 million.

== See also ==
- List of most expensive paintings
