= A Couple (Les Fiancés) =

Painting by Pierre-Auguste Renoir

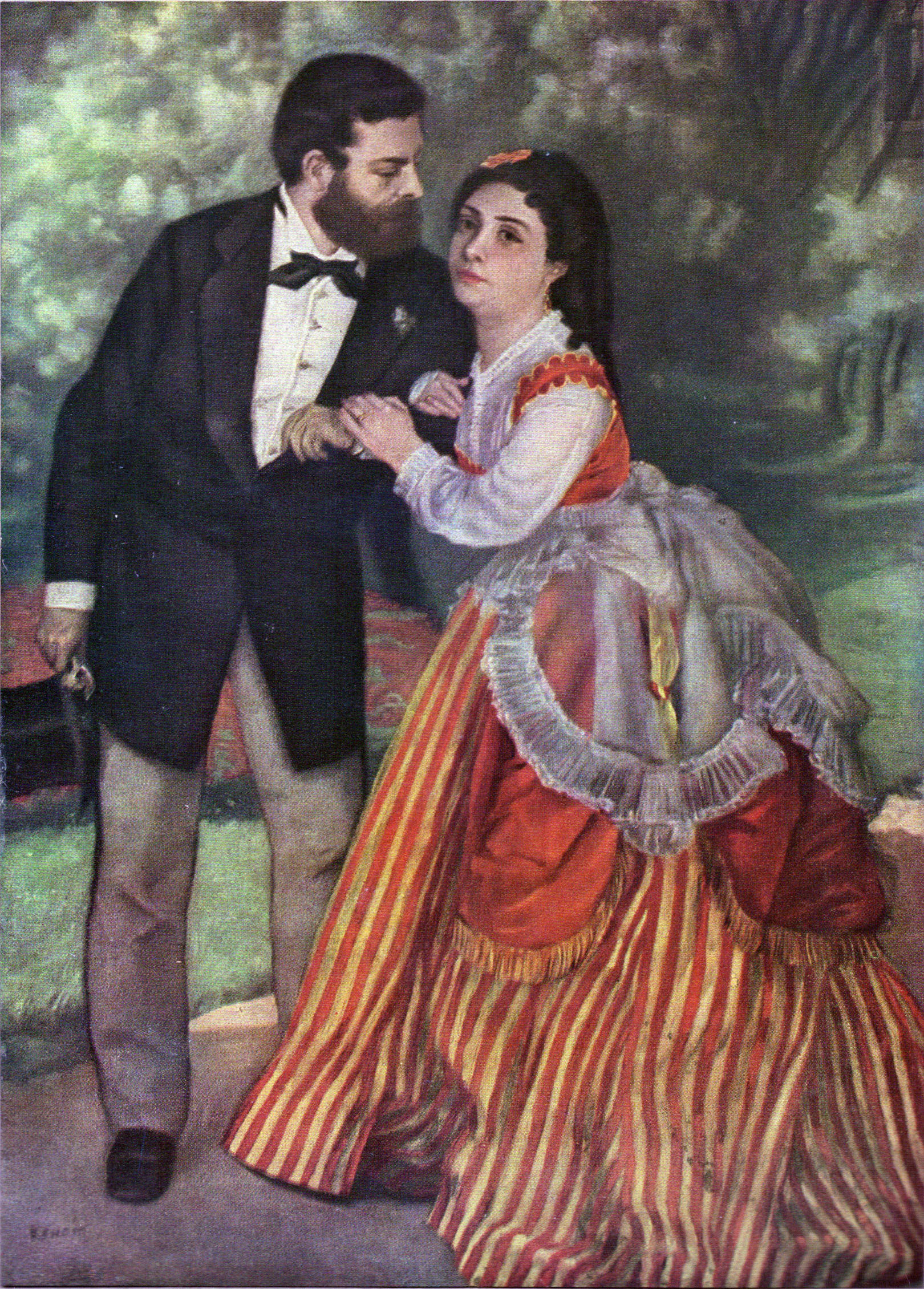
- Artist: Pierre-Auguste Renoir
- Year: c. 1868
- Medium: Oil on canvas
- Dimensions: 105 cm × 75 cm (41 in × 30 in)
- Location: Wallraf–Richartz Museum; Cologne, Germany

A Couple (Les Fiancés) also known as The Engaged Couple or Alfred Sisley and his Wife, is an oil-on-canvas painting by the French artist Pierre-Auguste Renoir (1841–1919), created around 1868 during his early Salon period at a time when he focused on thematic works about couples. It was acquired by the Wallraf–Richartz Museum in 1912.

== Background ==
Renoir and Alfred Sisley (1839–1899) both attended the studio of Charles Gleyre in the early 1860s. By 1865, they were good friends. Renoir painted Sisley's portrait several times, beginning with Mother Anthony's Tavern (1866). A letter from Renoir to artist Frédéric Bazille (1841–1870) in September 1869 identifies the woman at Sisley's side as Renoir's model Lise Tréhot (1848–1922). In the letter to Bazille, Renoir writes about his desperation for money: "I exhibited [the portraits of] Lise and Sisley at Carpentier's. I am going to try to stick him for about 100 francs, and I'm going to put my woman in white up for auction. I'll sell it for whatever price it goes for; it's all the same to me."

== Description ==
Although Lise was Renoir's lover at the time of the painting, he had her pose with Sisley, who was also involved with another woman, Eugénie Lescouézec. Art historian Michael F. Zimmermann writes that "the result was the modern image of an engaged couple, as well as a genre portrait enlarged to life size. The painter presents the gentleman's caressing affection and the lady's grateful intimacy from the perspective of a close friend, who recognizes these gestures as habitual but none the less touching."

== Analysis ==
The painting shows the inspiration of Realism, particularly the influence of the work of Édouard Manet (1832–1883), although by this time Renoir was working towards his own personal style. The museum performed an X-ray in 2021, which revealed that an altogether different painting lies beneath the current work.

== Influence ==
Pablo Picasso (1881–1973) was a personal fan of Renoir, and at one time owned seven of his paintings. He was also a fierce defender of Renoir against his critics in the avant-garde. Inspired by A Couple (Les Fiancés), Picasso produced three pencil studies (Le Ménage Sisley) based on the work.

== See also ==
- List of paintings by Pierre-Auguste Renoir
