= Constant-Joseph Brochart =

French painter

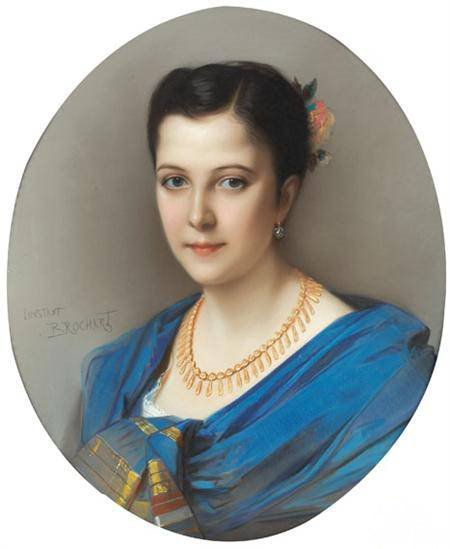
Clémentine Stora, Constant-Joseph Brochart, c. 1880. Pastel. Private collection, New York.

Constant-Joseph Brochart (7 April 1816 – 7 May 1889) was a French artist known for the charm and colouration that he brought to portraits of young women and children.

Brochart was born in Lille and studied at the École des beaux-arts there before travelling to Paris where he made a name for himself in portraiture.

He died in Paris.

== Gallery ==
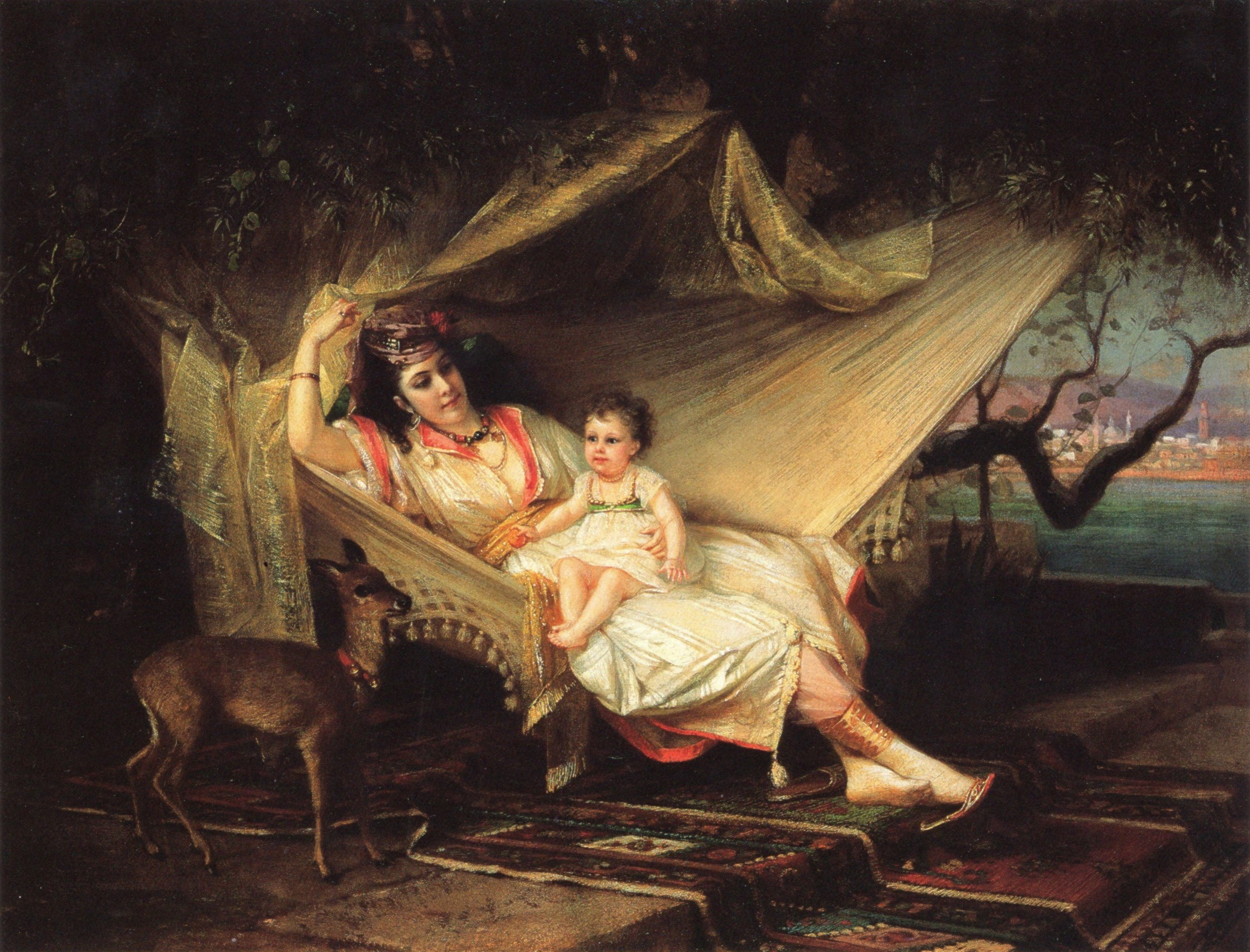
Clémentine Stora and her Daughter Lucie, 1877

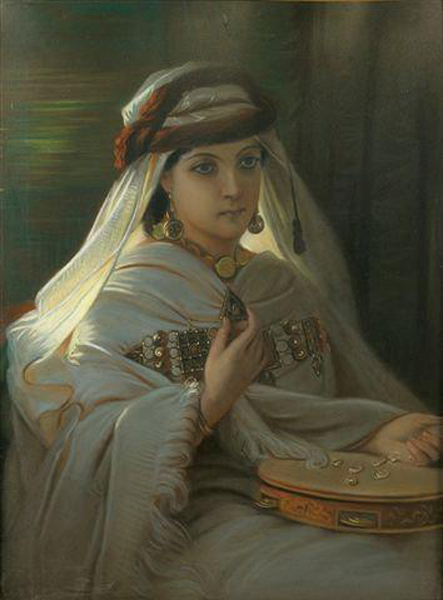
Young girl with tambourine

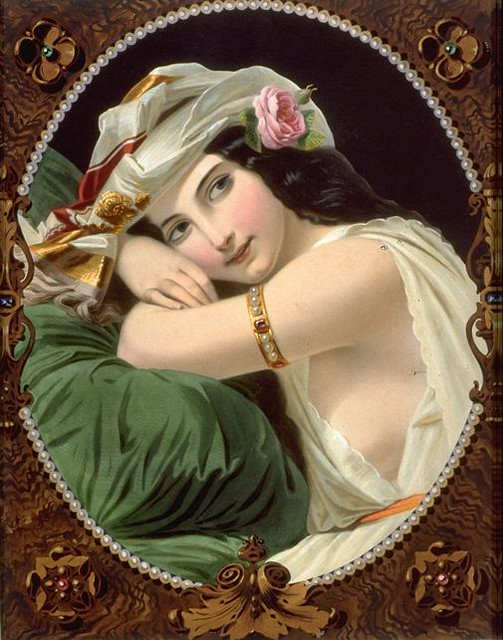
The Pearl of the Harem

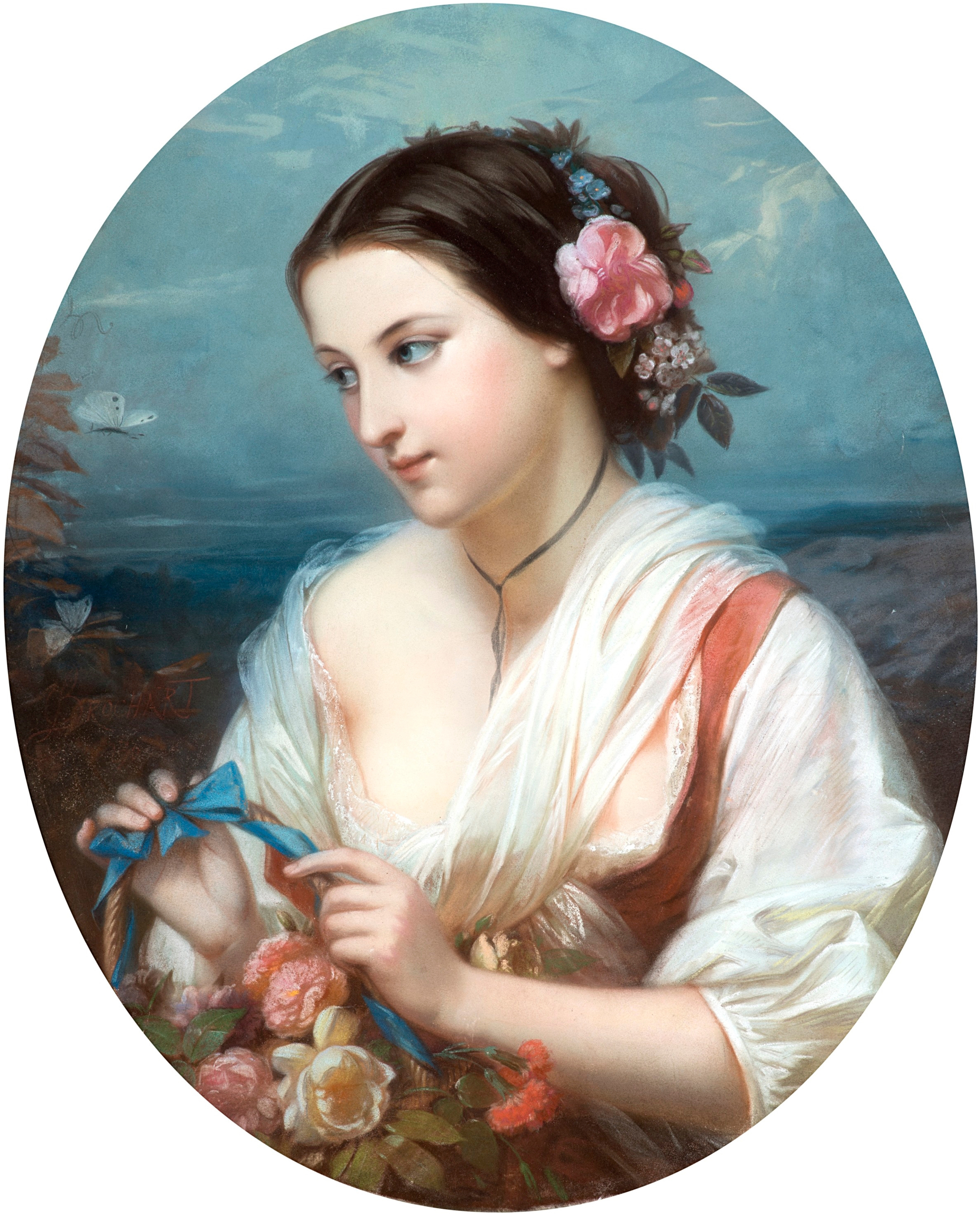
Flora

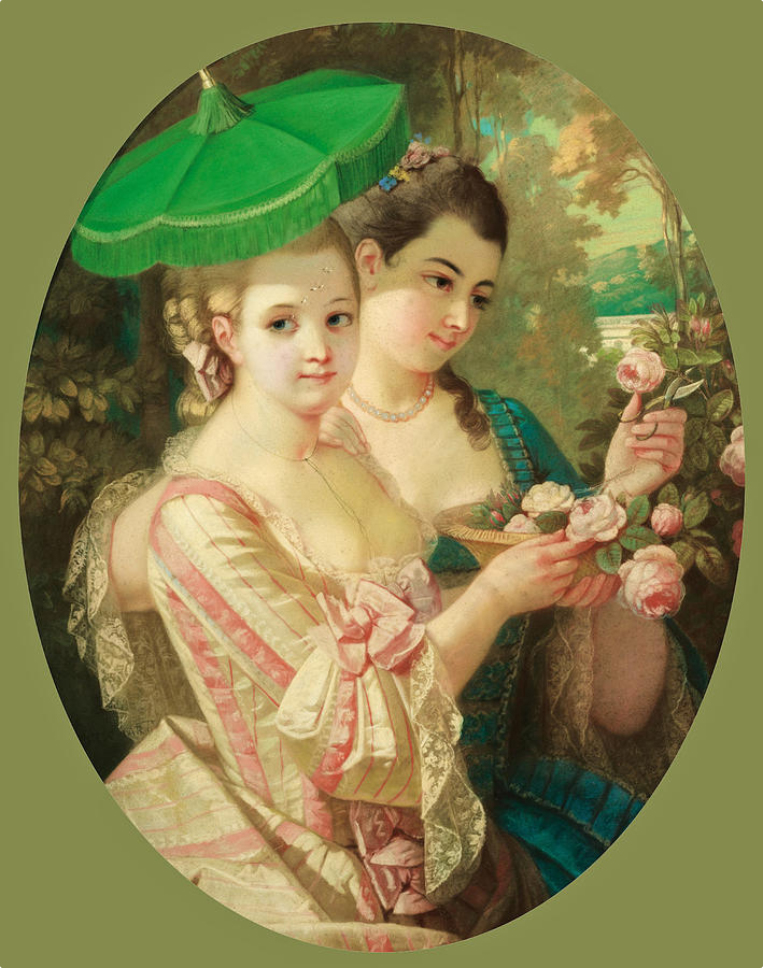
Young women with parasols

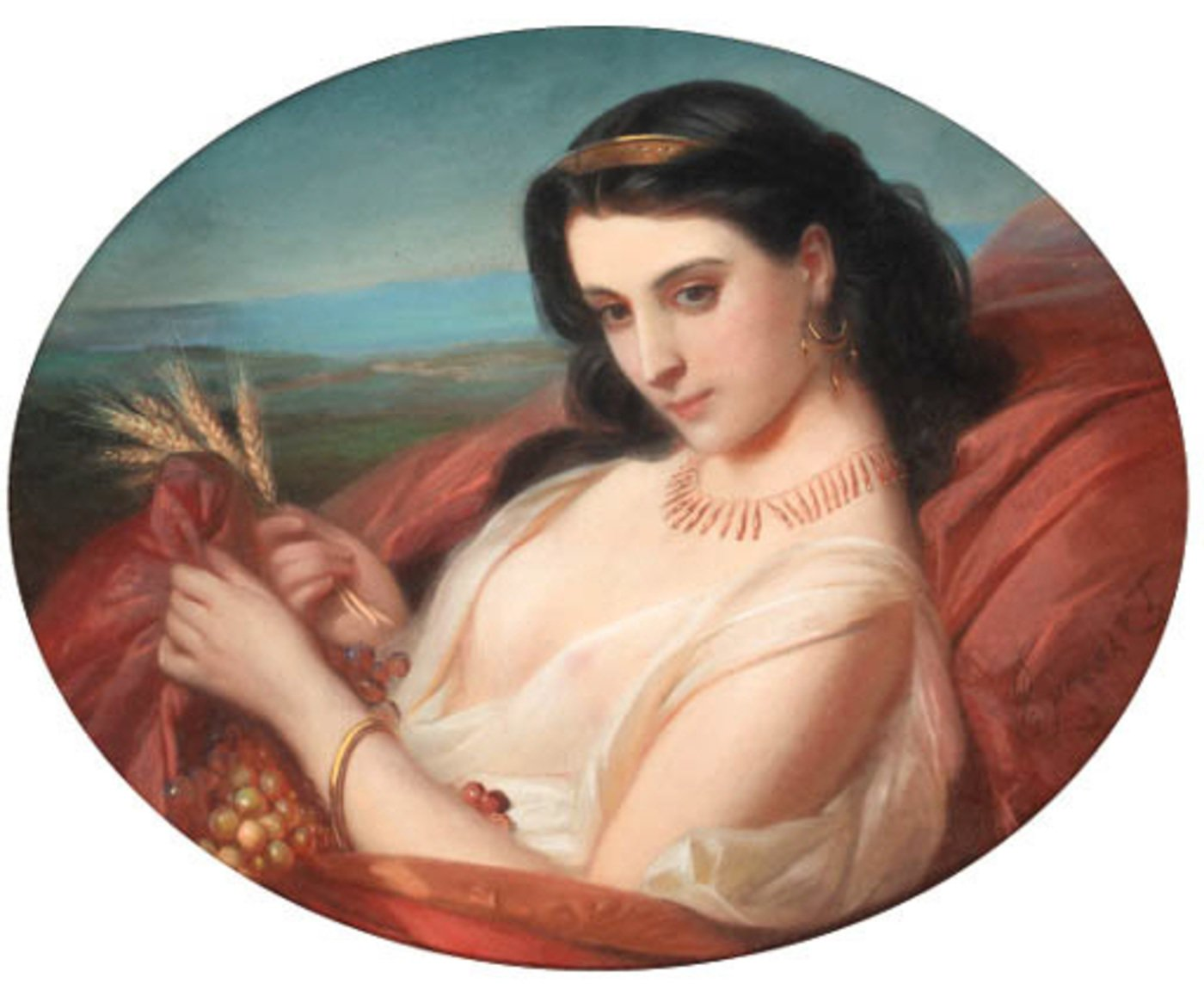
A young beauty reclining draped in a dress

== See also ==
- Madame Clémentine Valensi Stora (L'Algérienne)
