= Parisian Women in Algerian Costume (The Harem) =

Painting by Pierre-Auguste Renoir

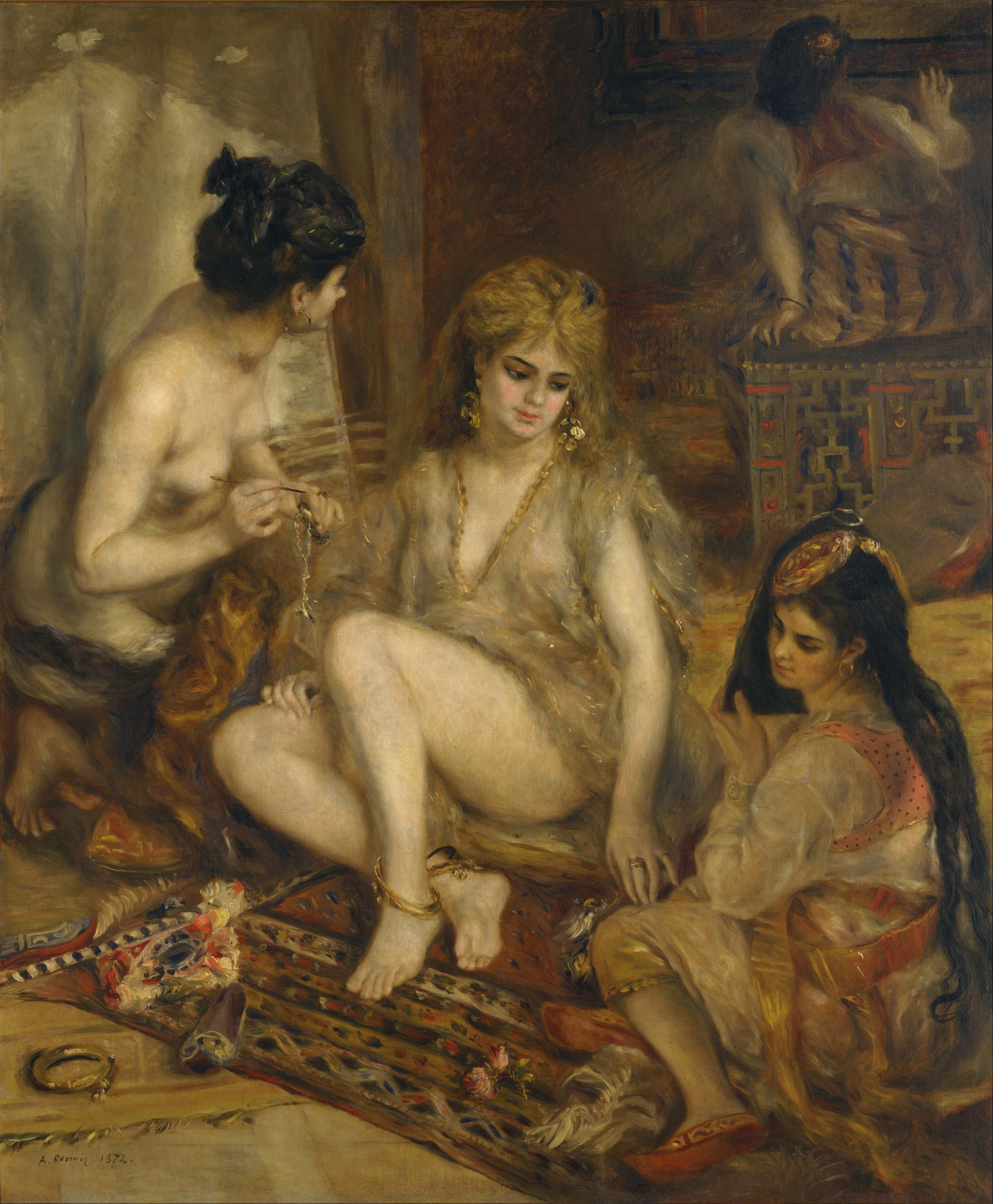
- Artist: Pierre-Auguste Renoir
- Year: 1872
- Medium: Oil on canvas
- Dimensions: 156 cm × 129 cm (61 in × 51 in)
- Location: National Museum of Western Art; Tokyo

Parisian Women in Algerian Costume (The Harem), sometimes known as Interior of a Harem in Montmartre (Parisian Women Dressed in Algerian costumes), is a painting by Pierre-Auguste Renoir, completed 1872, which Renoir created in homage to Eugène Delacroix's Women of Algiers in their Apartment (1834, Louvre). It was rejected for entry to the 1872 Paris Salon, disliked by the artist and eventually sold for a small sum as part of a larger lot. It is now in the National Museum of Western Art, Tokyo.

== Homage to Delacroix ==
In the 1870s, Renoir temporarily rejected the realism of Gustave Courbet and Édouard Manet in favour of the colour and drama of his hero Delacroix. He painted The Harem in homage to Delacroix's Women of Algiers in their Apartment (1834, Louvre) which he later described as "the most beautiful picture in existence".

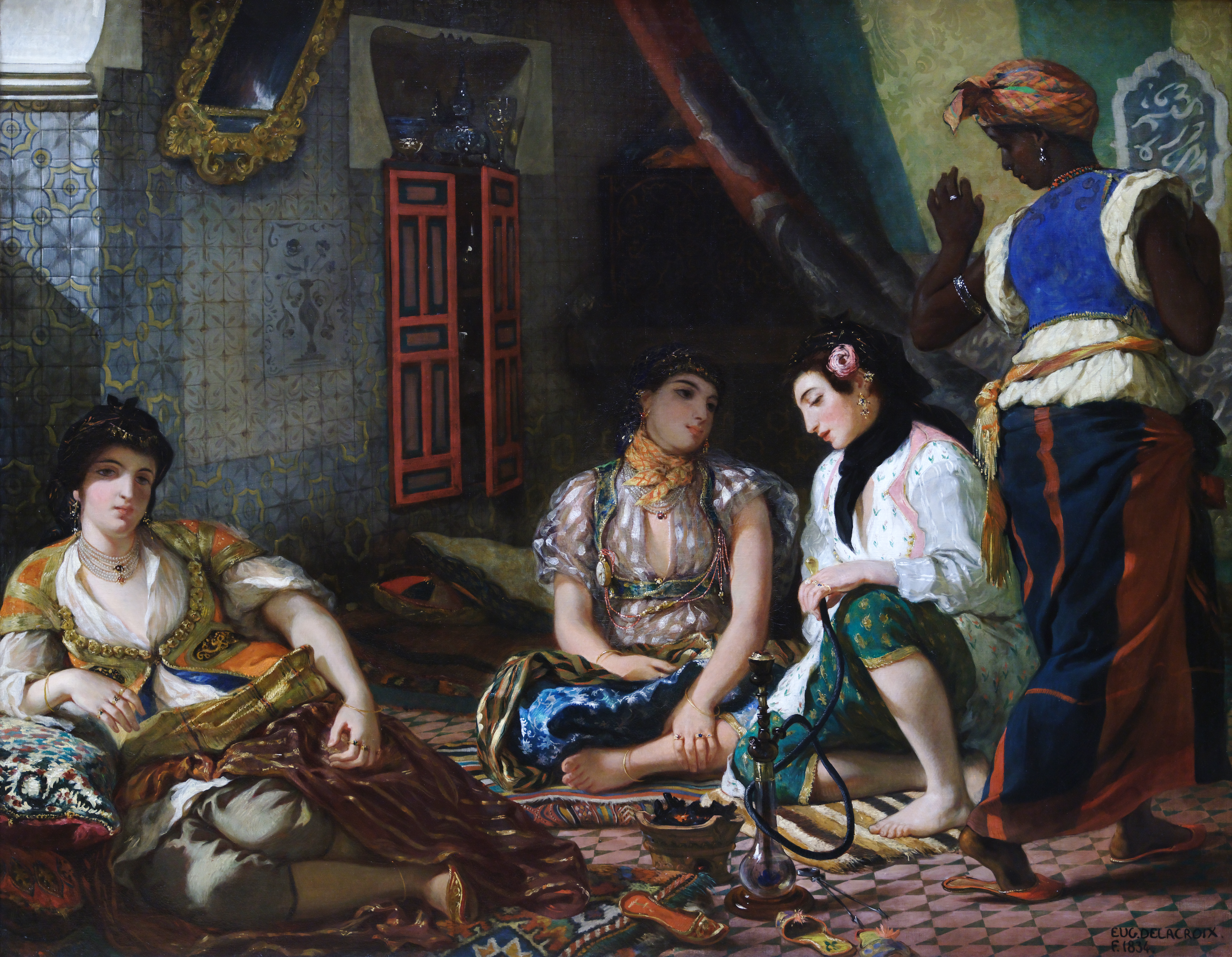
Eugène Delacroix. The Women of Algiers in Their Apartment. 1834. Oil on canvas. Louvre.

The title of the picture acknowledged the artificial nature of much Orientalist painting by making it clear that these were Parisian women in costume. It may also be a humorous reference to the fact that Delacroix had been forced to paint Women of Algiers in the studio using French models after failing to obtain adequate access to women's accommodation during his trip to Algiers in 1832.

Roger Benjamin described The Harem as a "naturalist demythologization of the Orient" and in the nature of a pastiche. It was rejected for the Salon of 1872 which Benjamin argues resulted in the end of Renoir's experiments with Orientalism in the 1870s. Although Algerian costume and culture was well known in France in the mid-nineteenth century as a result of French colonial involvement in the country, Renoir did not visit Algeria until 1881.

== Composition and subject ==
The composition of Renoir's work is quite different from Delacroix's Women of Algiers. While Delacroix arranged his figures across the foreground, Renoir places his in a diagonal with a final indistinct figure at top right. The picture plane is tipped towards the spectator to the extent that the women look like they may slip down to the bottom of the picture. The two black-haired women at the front appear to be in subservient roles attending the blonde headed woman in the centre who is evidently being prepared for a sexual encounter. The woman on the right is holding up a mirror while the one on the left may be applying make-up using a brush. There is nudity and near nudity which Delacroix did not include in his scene.

The figure in the top right corner of the picture is apparently greeting a visitor, whose arrival also attracts the attention of the woman on the left. There is a sense that the arrival of the visitor is unexpected or sudden. The woman at the top has her hand up, perhaps in surprise or to delay access while preparations for the encounter continue. One reading of the painting is that it depicts the arrival of a male client in a Paris brothel with an oriental theme.

One of the models has been identified as Renoir's lover Lise Tréhot. Tréhot sat for Renoir up to about 1872. The Harem was one of the last paintings for which she modeled for Renoir.

== Provenance ==
Renoir was not fond of The Harem, describing it to Ambroise Vollard as a "grande machine", a large academic composition. He moved studios and left it behind, hoping his former landlady would get rid of it, but he eventually had to take it back and it was sold in a lot of eleven works that fetched only 500 francs.

The painting was acquired by Hyacinthe-Eugène Meunier (Murer) of Paris. E. Fasquelle, Paris (before 1912); Bernheim-Jeune, Paris (purchased by Eugène Fasquelle, 4 October 1913); Bernheim-Jeune fils (bought by Bernheim-Jeune, 26 January 1914); Durand-Ruel, Paris (bought by Bernheim-Jeune fils, 31 Dec. 1921); Kojiro Matsukata (bought at Durand-Ruel, 31 December 1921(?)); Sequestered by the French government, 1944; Returned to Japan, 1959.

== Influence ==
The painting is described in detail in Anthony Hecht's poem "The Deodand."

== See also ==
- List of paintings by Pierre-Auguste Renoir
- Les Femmes d'Alger (Picasso)
- Madame Clémentine Valensi Stora (L'Algérienne) (Renoir)
- Olympia (Manet)
