= Women of Algiers =

Paintings by Eugène Delacroix

Women of Algiers in Their Apartment
- Femmes d'Alger dans leur appartement (French)
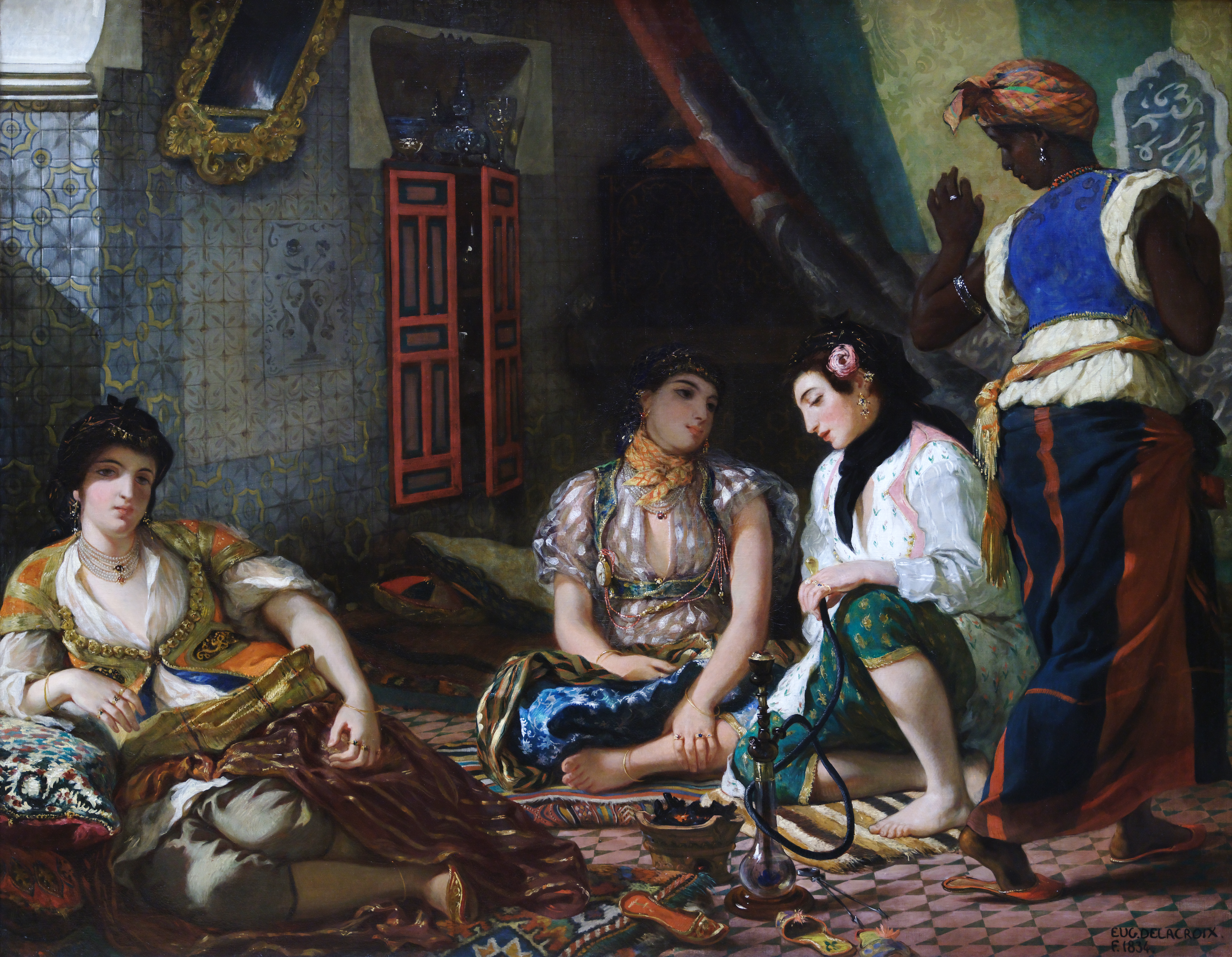
- Artist: Eugène Delacroix
- Year: 1834
- Medium: Oil on canvas
- Dimensions: 180 cm × 229 cm (71 in × 90 in)
- Location: Louvre, Paris

Women of Algiers in Their Apartment (French: Femmes d'Alger dans leur appartement) is the title of two oil on canvas paintings by the French Romantic painter Eugène Delacroix.

Delacroix's first version of Women of Algiers was painted in Paris in 1834 and is located in the Louvre, Paris, France. The second work, painted fifteen years later between 1847 and 1849, is located at the Musée Fabre, Montpellier, France. The two works both depict the same scene of four women together in an enclosed room. Despite the similar setting, the two paintings evoke completely different moods through the depiction of the women. Delacroix's earlier 1834 work captures the separation between the women and the viewer. The second painting instead invites the viewer into the scene through the warm inviting gaze of the women.

Women of Algiers, along with Delacroix's other Orientalist paintings, has inspired many artists of later generations. In 1888 both Vincent van Gogh and Paul Gauguin travelled to Montpellier to view Delacroix's 1849 version of Women of Algiers. The painting served as a source of inspiration to the later impressionists, and a series of 15 paintings and numerous drawings by Pablo Picasso in 1954.

Paul Cézanne described Delacroix's intoxicating colour plays as "All this luminous colour... It seems to me that it enters the eye like a glass of wine running into your gullet and it makes you drunk straight away".

== 1834 painting ==
The 1834 painting was first displayed at the Salon of 1834 in Paris, where it received mixed reviews. The art critic Gustave Plance wrote in a review for Revue des deux mondes that Delacroix's painting Femmes d'Alger dans leur Appartement was about painting and nothing more, painting that is fresh, vigorous, advanced with spirit, and of an audacity completely venetian, yet yielding nothing to the masters it recalls. King Louis Philippe purchased the painting in 1834 and presented it to the Musée du Luxembourg. In 1874 the painting was moved to the Louvre, Paris where it remains today as part of the permanent collection.

The work depicts four women enclosed in a lavishly decorated room. Three of the women are sumptuously adorned with loose, billowing garments and gold jewellery. One woman has a pink flower in her hair. The fourth woman is a black enslaved person who exits the scene, looking over her left shoulder towards the seated women. Delacroix perfectly rendered the features of the women's clothing, adornments, and the interior decor in great detail. This attention to details follows through from his 1832 Algerian sketches into the 1834 oil painting of the same scene. The painting has been applauded by scholars for its attempted ethnographic depiction, both in the relatively clothed forms of the females and the title of the painting itself, as it is devoid of the objectifying terms odalisque or harem. Delacroix's Women of Algiers does not depict an overtly eroticized version of the Oriental female, as other artists did, such as Jean-Auguste-Dominique Ingres' salacious depiction in his 1814 painting Grande Odalisque.

Although there is a desire for realism to evoke the decorative mood, the work fails to extend the desire for realism to the women themselves, and the social customs of the harem. There is almost no narrative in the stagnant space. The women are cloistered together, not engaging with one another. The challenging stare of the women on the left reflects hostility towards the permeation of the private space. Aside from this glance there is no depiction of the nineteenth century social customs of the harems of elite Algerian culture. Ultimately Delacroix's stolen glance into the Algerian harem provided him with little visual information to create a realistic image.

With these gaps in visual information Delacroix fills the voids with his own European interpretation, resulting in a subtler version of the fantasy female. With the exposed décolletage, loose unbounded clothing and languid poses, Delacroix's Algerian females are still situated in the European oriental dream. The addition of stereotypical Orientalist motifs, such as the narghile pipe, charcoal burner, and the odalisques pose. Together they create a fictional image that parallels the European fantasy of the harem more than reality. The nineteenth century European viewer's connotations of the "narghile pipe" with smoking hashish or opium, as well as the connotations of the loose unbound clothing to sexual immorality, added to this Western fantasy.

The painting was restored in 2021, removing layers of yellowed varnish and revealing Delacroix's virtuosic use of color.

== History ==
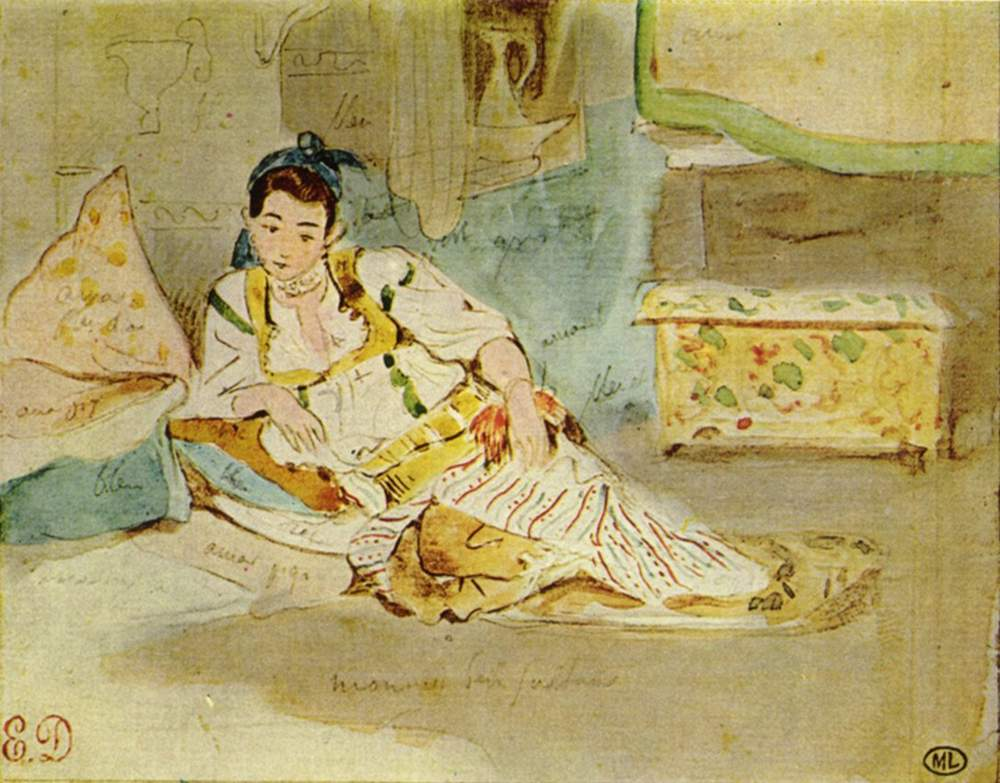
The Women of Algiers (study), 1832, 10×13cm, Louvre (Mounay ben Sultan, left woman)

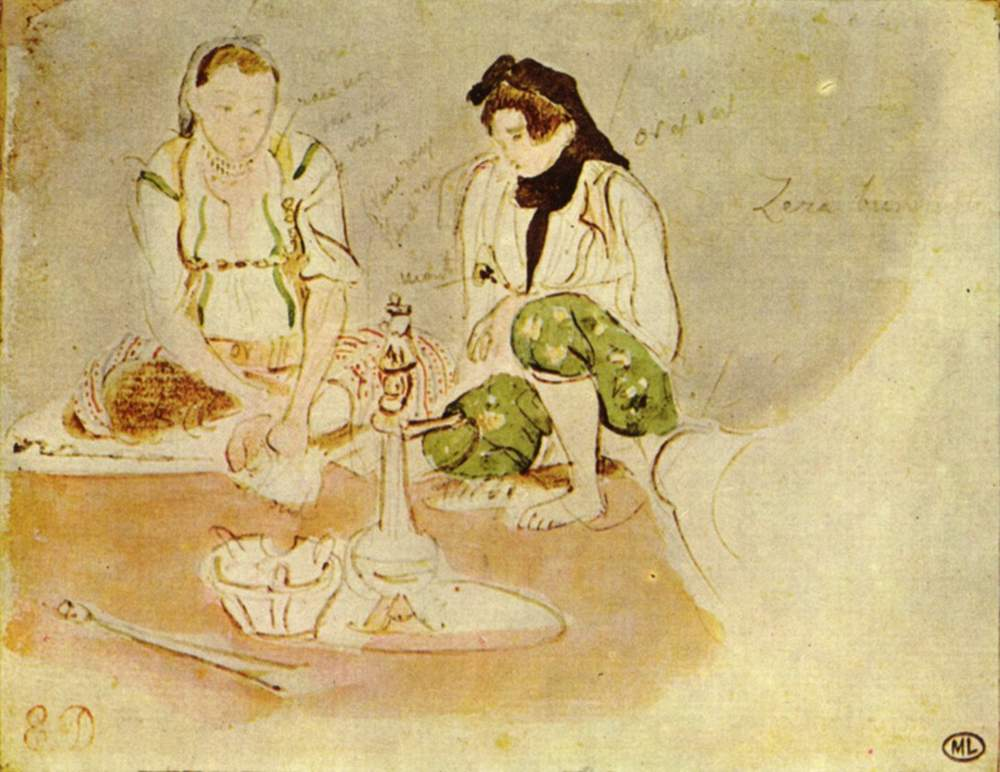
The Women of Algiers (study), 1832, 10×13cm, Louvre (right group)

The French conquest of Algeria started in 1830 and affected France's relationship with nearby countries, such as Morocco. Towards the end of 1831 King Louis Philippe I sent a diplomatic party to Morocco in order to establish friendly relations and negotiate a treaty with the Sultan. He assigned the young diplomat Charles de Mornay. At that time it was common to take artists along, in order to visually document the journey. Delacroix joined the diplomatic party by chance through social connections. Previously, when Delacroix was studying under Pierre Guérin, he had become friends with a fellow student, Henri Duponchel, who had recently become director of scenic design at the Paris Opera (and would later become its managing director). Duponchel was in the social circle of Mornay's mistress, the actress Mademoiselle Mars, and recommended Delacroix for this assignment.

Delacroix joined the party and together they set sail in 1831 and arrived in Tangier, Morocco, on 25 January 1832. Delacroix greatly relished the atmosphere, the colours, the objects, the people, and the architecture of this exotic world. Delacroix recorded everything in his journals. During his six-month trip Delacroix filled seven large sketchbooks and created an album of eighteen watercolours. Delacroix was invited into Jewish households to sketch. His 1832 journal recounts in detail the clothing, interior décor, and festivities of the Jewish households and he drew several small sketches of the Jewish families and households. From these he later painted the works Jewish Wedding in Morocco (1839) and Jewish Bride (c.1832). Delacroix found it significantly harder to sketch Arabic women, due to religious constrictions. Despite this setback Delacroix still attempted to sketch the Arabic women. As soon as he would seek to sketch them from afar, the Arabic women who would hang their washing out on roof terraces would immediately alert their husbands.

Delacroix returned home via Spain, and Algeria, where he stayed for three days. By luck he was at the Algerian port where he met a merchant who gave him access to his household's private harem. Delacroix created two small sketches of the women in the Algerian harem that he later used to create his oil painting Women of Algiers.

== Orientalism ==
The nineteenth century concept of North Africa was a warped and fantasised interpretation of the foreign countries. Ottoman Turkey, Egypt, Algeria, Morocco, and India were all condensed under the enigmatic category of "The Orient". It was perceived as a timeless, exotic land of fantasy and adventure. This ignorant understanding had been developing since the seventeenth century with the introduction of Chinese and Japanese culture and aesthetics into Europe by the Jesuits. Many fictional works were paraded as fact, such as Montesquieu's 1721 book Persian Letters. A fictional set of correspondence that satirically recounted the European character's response to North Africa. These books, as well as other paintings, drawings, literature, photographs, and travel diaries, created preconceptions that coloured the travelling artists interpretation of their surroundings in North Africa. French Orientalist painting took off with Napoleon's Egyptian campaign of 1798, the year in which Delacroix was born. French fascination again increased during the Greek revolution in 1821–30, during which time Victor Hugo authored the volume of poems Les Orientales and Delacroix contributed two paintings, The Massacre at Chios (1824) and Greece Expiring on the Ruins of Messolonghi (1826).

By the nineteenth century, this warped myth had developed into a perceived truth and each subsequent piece of information on North Africa validated, and in turn propagated this Oriental myth. European depiction of the harem was almost perpetually dependent on the Oriental myth. European male artists were unable to obtain access to the harem and so relied upon visits to brothels and their own imagination to conjure a fantasy image of the space. Research has shown that even first hand accounts by female artists and writers who had the opportunity to enter local harems were slightly embellished. These fantasy depictions regularly eroticized and objectified the spaces, see Jean-Léon Gérôme's 1876 Pool in a harem, for example. Eugène Delacroix had the benefit of physically visiting a harem in 1832, albeit very briefly.

The European myth of the harem fantasy intensified in the nineteenth century with the ready availability of the book Arabian Nights (also known as Thousand and One Nights). Antoine Galland first translated it into French in 1717. The enormously popular book of the eighteenth and nineteenth centuries painted a picture of a timeless fantasy world of exotic adventure. The influence of this tale on travelling artist's first hand absorption and interpretation of visual information is discussed in Mary Roberts's book Intimate Outsiders.

Delacroix himself paralleled his experiences in North Africa to the Arabian Nights. In a letter to Alexis de Tocqueville several years after his trip he mentioned, "Never in my life have I observed anything more bizarre than the first sight of Tangier. It is a tale out of the Thousand and One Nights... A prodigious mix of races and costumes...This whole world moves about with an activity that seems feverish."

== 1847–1849 painting ==
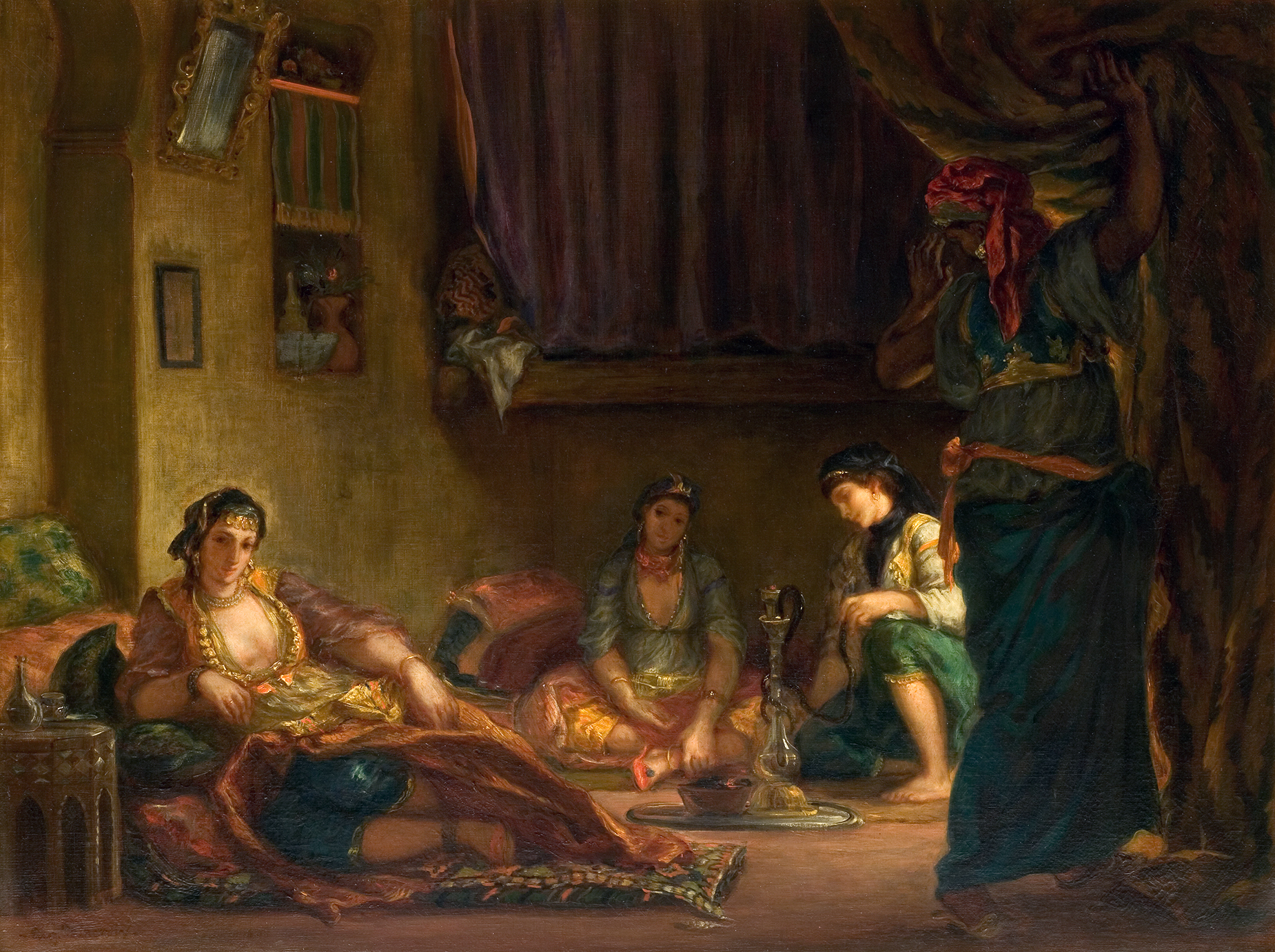
Femmes d’Alger dans leur Appartement

The second painting was created between 1847 and 1849 and currently resides at the Musée Fabre in Montpellier, France. The composition of the figures remains the same, however the women are now depicted as smaller figures and fade back into the background. The melody of gold, burnt umber, and red tones blending together creates a hazy, dreamlike reverie. Instead of leaving the scene, the enslaved black woman is now lifting away the curtain to reveal the seated women to the viewer. The women on the left wears a lower plunging neckline revealing her décolletage and she now stares softly at the viewer with a warm, inviting gaze.

The second painting was created fifteen years after the 1834 original. In comparison, the viewer can see the influence of time and nostalgia upon the interpretation of visual information. The slightly fantasied scene has been transformed into a picture of pure nostalgia. The European concept of the harem further implants itself within Delacroix's work, ultimately creating a painting that objectifies and eroticizes the Algerian women to a greater extent than the original 1834 version. It was exhibited at the Salon of 1849 at the Tuileries Palace.

== See also ==
- Parisian Women in Algerian Costume (The Harem), Pierre-Auguste Renoir, 1872.
