= John House (art historian) =

British art historian

- Born: 19 April 1945; Southborough, Kent, England
- Died: 7 February 2012 (aged 66); Catford, London, England
- Occupation: Art Historian

Academic background
- Education: Westminster School; New College, Oxford; Courtauld Institute of Art

Academic work
- Discipline: Art History
- Sub-discipline: Impressionism
- Institutions: Courtauld Institute of Art

John Peter Humphrey House (19 April 1945 – 7 February 2012) was an English art historian, focusing largely on Impressionism. He was considered one of the "world's leading experts on Monet".

== Personal life ==
John House was born in Southborough, Kent in 1945 to literary scholars Arthur Humphry House (1908-1955) and Madeline Edith (1903-1978) who lived at the time near Uckfield, Sussex. House attended Westminster School and after New College, Oxford, reading Literae humaniores and graduating with a first in 1967. In 1968, he married Jill Elaine Turner at St John's Presbyterian Church, Bromley, with whom House would have two sons, although the marriage would be dissolved in 2009. In 1969, House completed his master's degree at the Courtauld Institute in London, being awarded his doctorate after gaining his post in 1976. House died of a heart attack in 2012.

== Career ==
House began lecturing at the University of East Anglia in 1969. Seven years later he would move to UCL and finally in 1980 to the Courtald Institute for the rest of his career. Here he would become reader by 1987, a chair by 1995, deputy director between 1996 and 1999 and Walter H. Annenberg professor by 2002.

House was a respected scholar on Impressionist art, curating and producing catalogues for a number of significant exhibitions focusing on the period. Among these were exhibitions held at the Courtauld Institute, Hayward Gallery, Clark Art Institute and Royal Academy. House was also interested in promoting art history to schools and the public including working with the BBC.

== Selected publications ==
- 1986: Monet: Nature into Art. New Haven, CT: Yale University Press. ISBN 978-0-300-03785-2
- 1994: Impressionism for England: Samuel Courtauld as Patron and Collector. London: Courtauld Institute Galleries. ISBN 978-0-300-06128-4
- 2004: Impressionism: Paint and Politics. New Haven, CT: Yale University Press. ISBN 978-0-300-10240-6
- 2007: Impressionists by the Sea. London: Royal Academy of Arts/Harry N. Abrams. ISBN 978-1-903973-89-9
