= Salon of 1868 =

1868 art exhibition in Paris

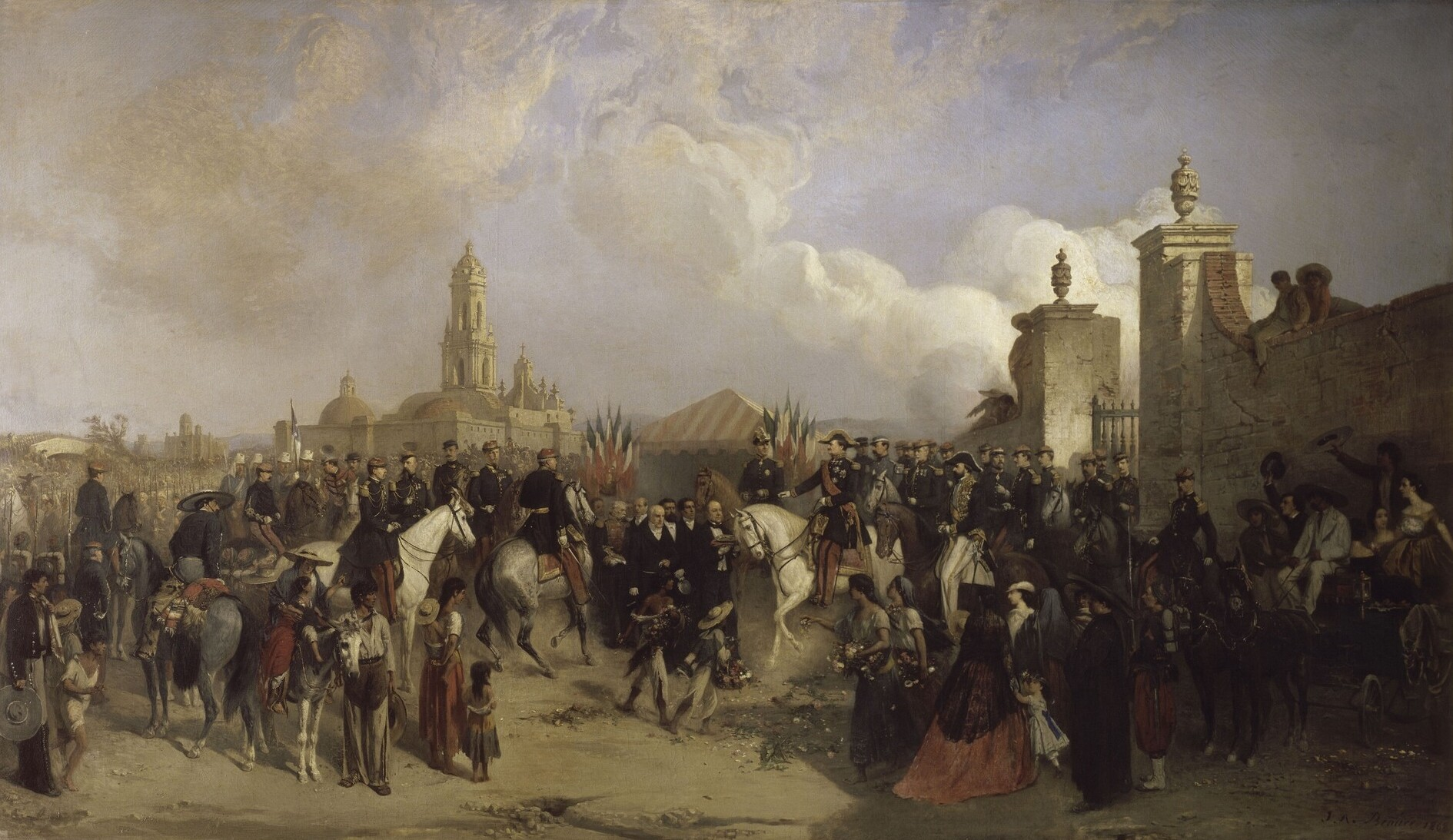
Entry of the French Expeditionary Force into Mexico City by Jean-Adolphe Beaucé

The Salon of 1868 was an art exhibition held at the Palace of Industry in Paris from 1 May 1868. The exhibition was the annual edition of the Salon organised by the Académie des Beaux-Arts and featured many leading artists of the Second French Empire.

The Salon featured paintings from several figures who would become associated with the Impressionist movement. After several years where his submitted works were rejected, Lise with a Parasol by Pierre-Auguste Renoir was displayed. Alfred Sisley's landscape Avenue of Chestnut Trees near La Celle-Saint-Cloud owed more to the tradition of the Barbizon school rather than Impressionism. Édouard Manet exhibited his Portrait of Emile Zola.

Napoleon III had commissioned a large history painting Entry of the French Expeditionary Force into Mexico City commemorating the French Intervention in Mexico for the Palace of Versailles, which was produced by Jean-Adolphe Beaucé and featured prominently at the Salon. Alfred Darjou also produced a depiction of the Emperor's 1865 visit to Relizane in French Algeria which also was intended for Versailles.

== Gallery ==
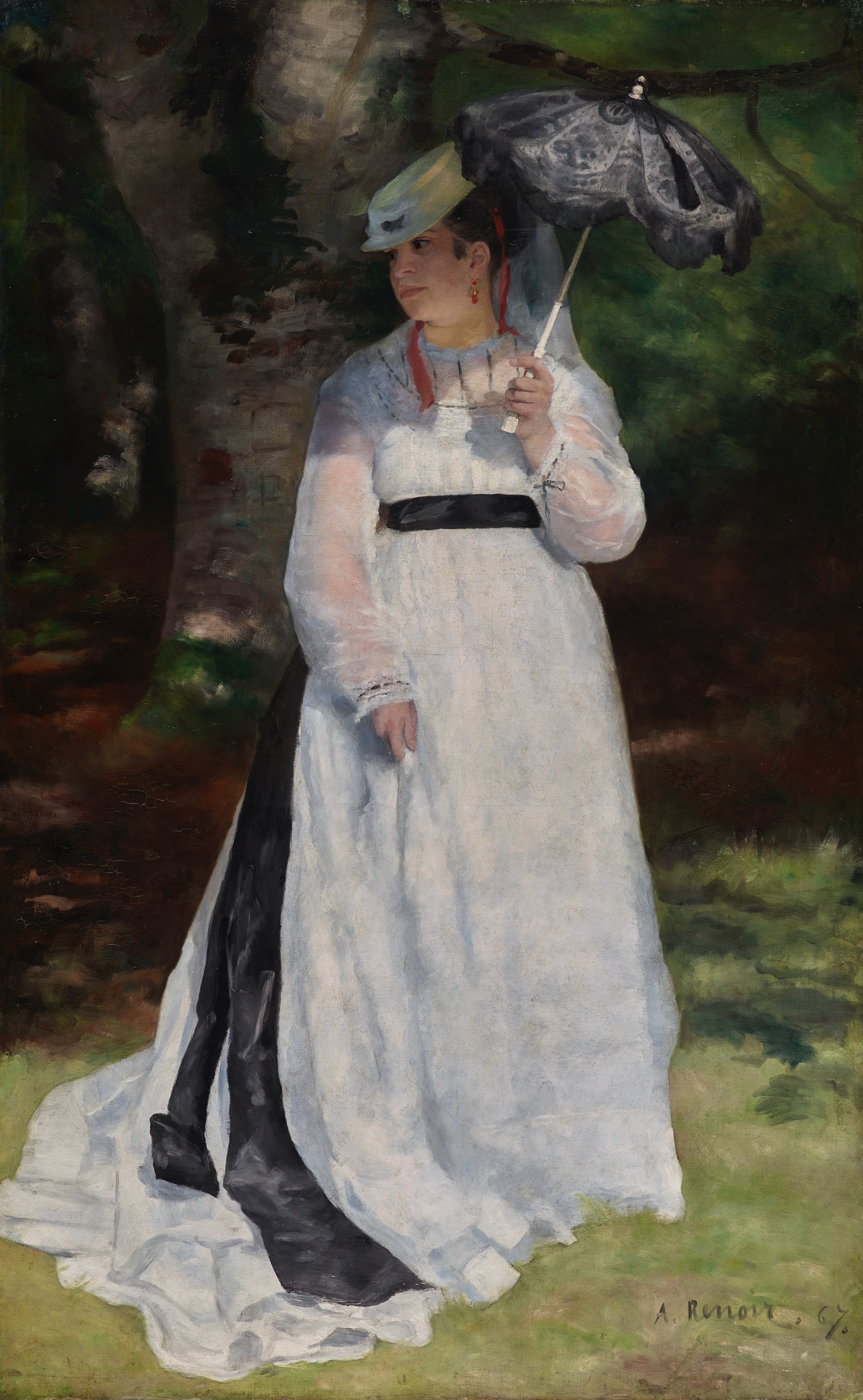
Lise with a Parasol by Pierre-Auguste Renoir

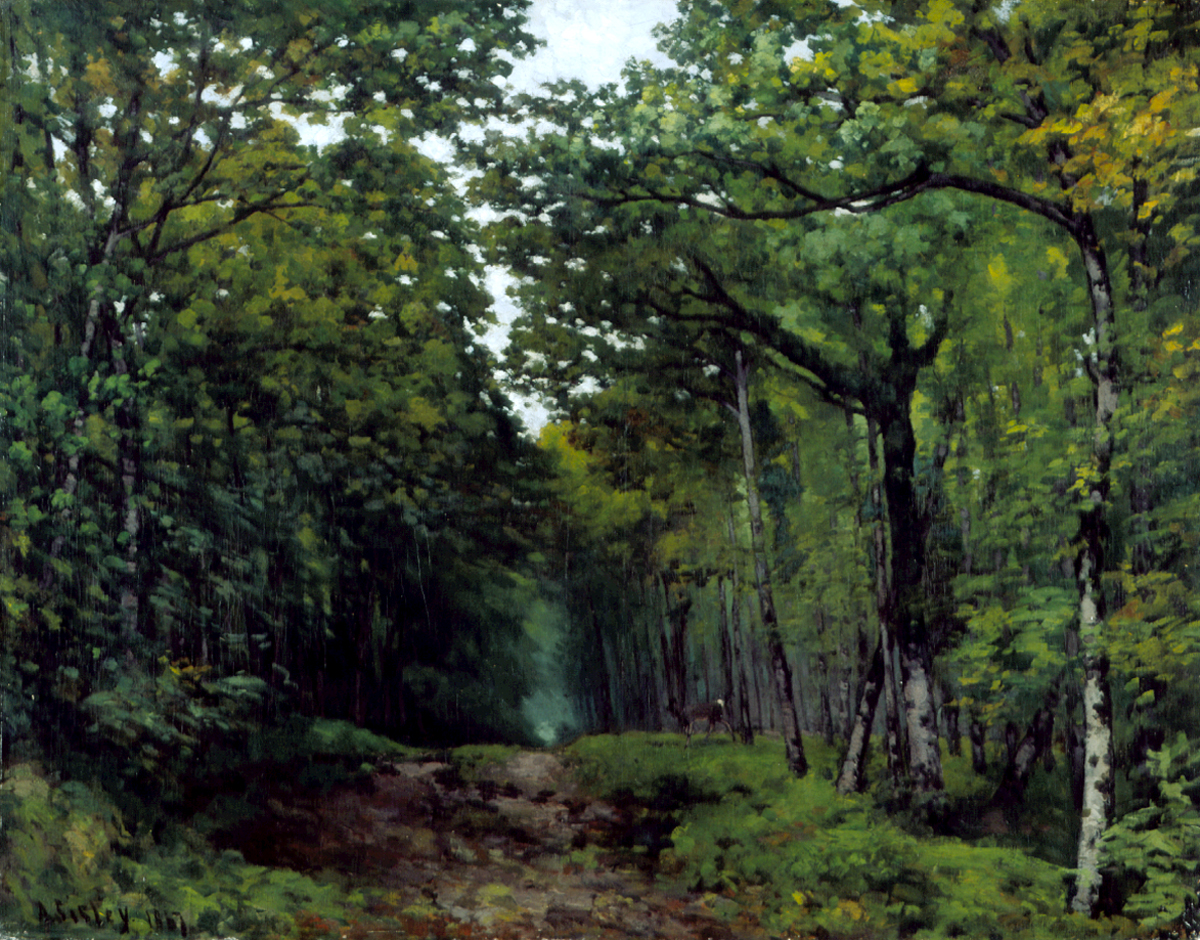
Avenue of Chestnut Trees near La Celle-Saint-Cloud by Alfred Sisley

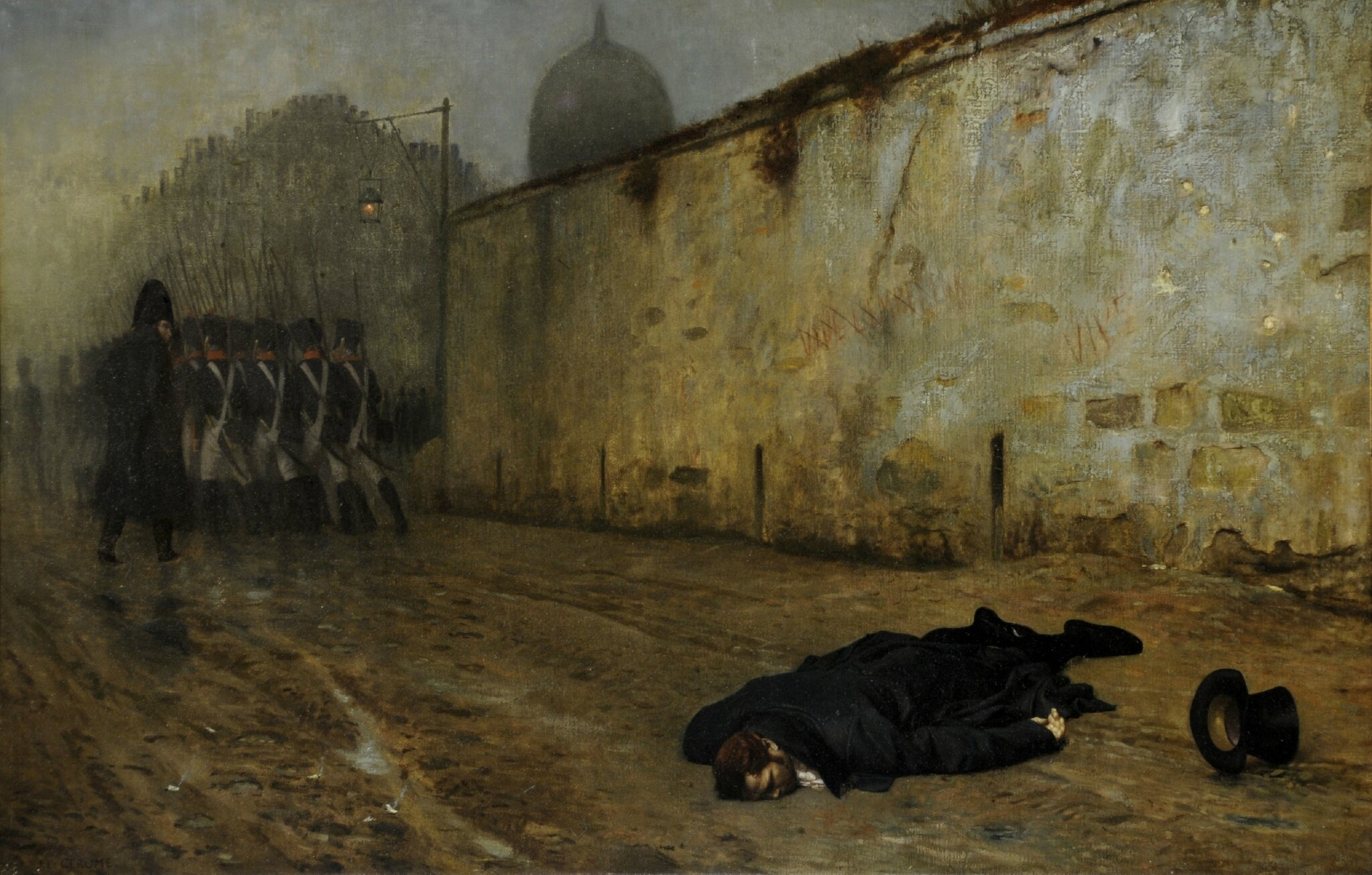
The Execution of Marshal Ney by Jean-Léon Gérôme

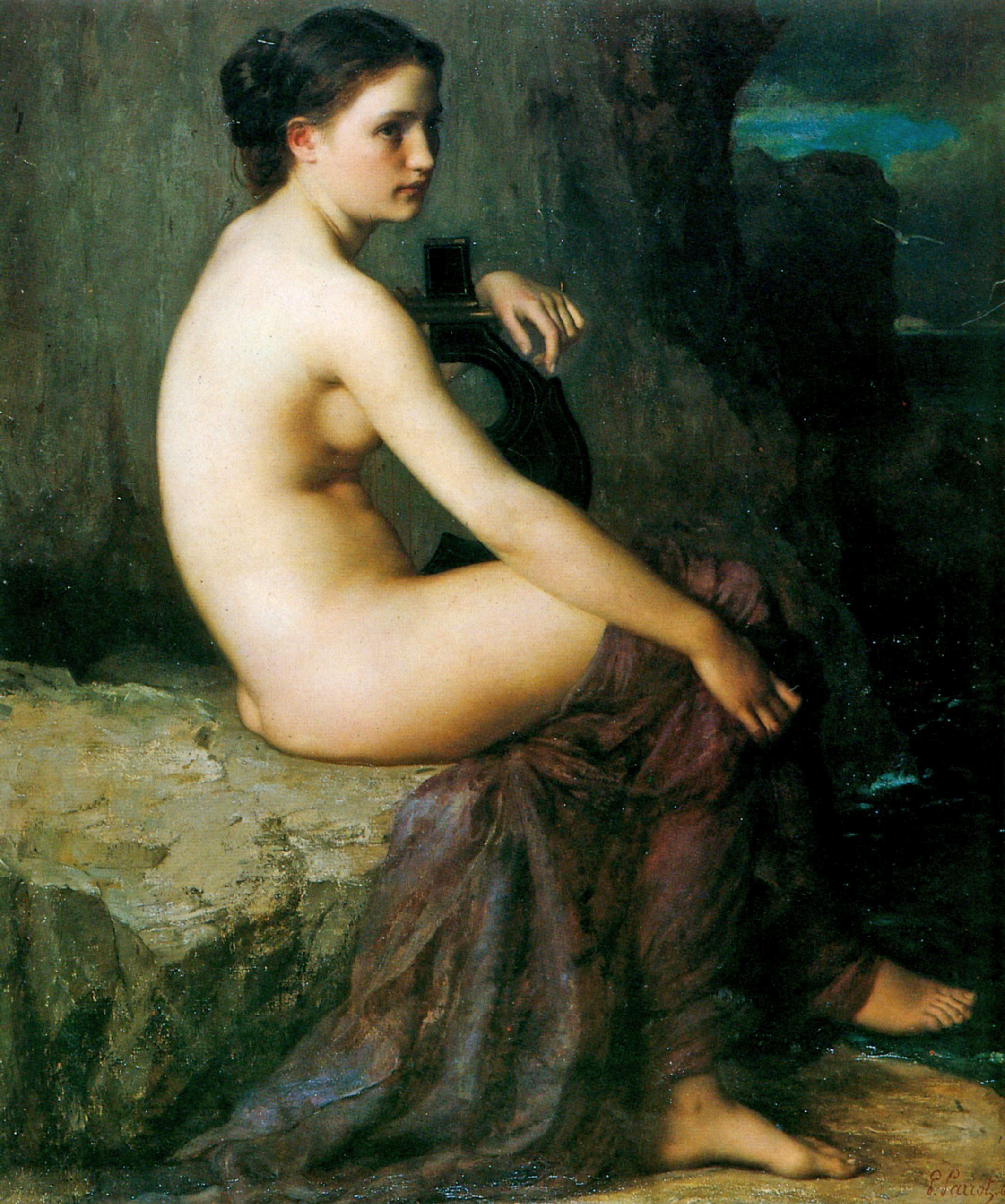
Elégie by Philippe Parrot

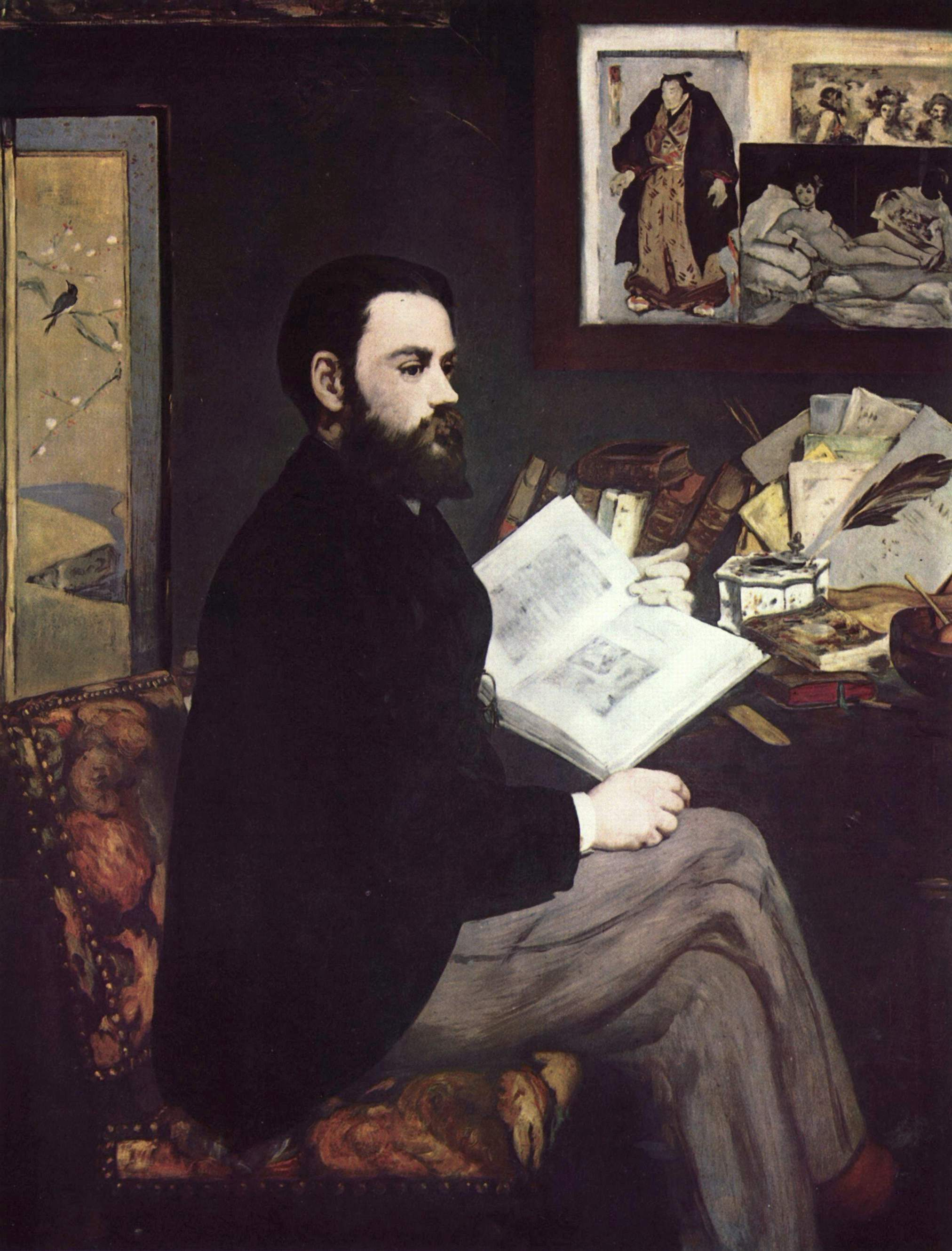
Portrait of Emile Zola by Édouard Manet

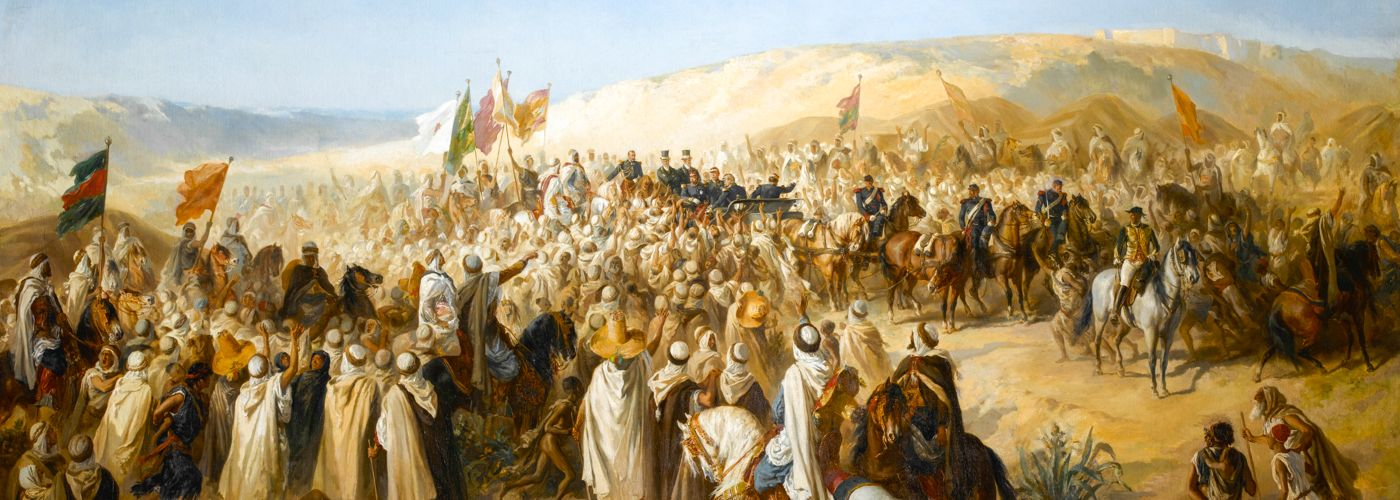
Emperor Napoleon III in Relizane by Alfred Darjou

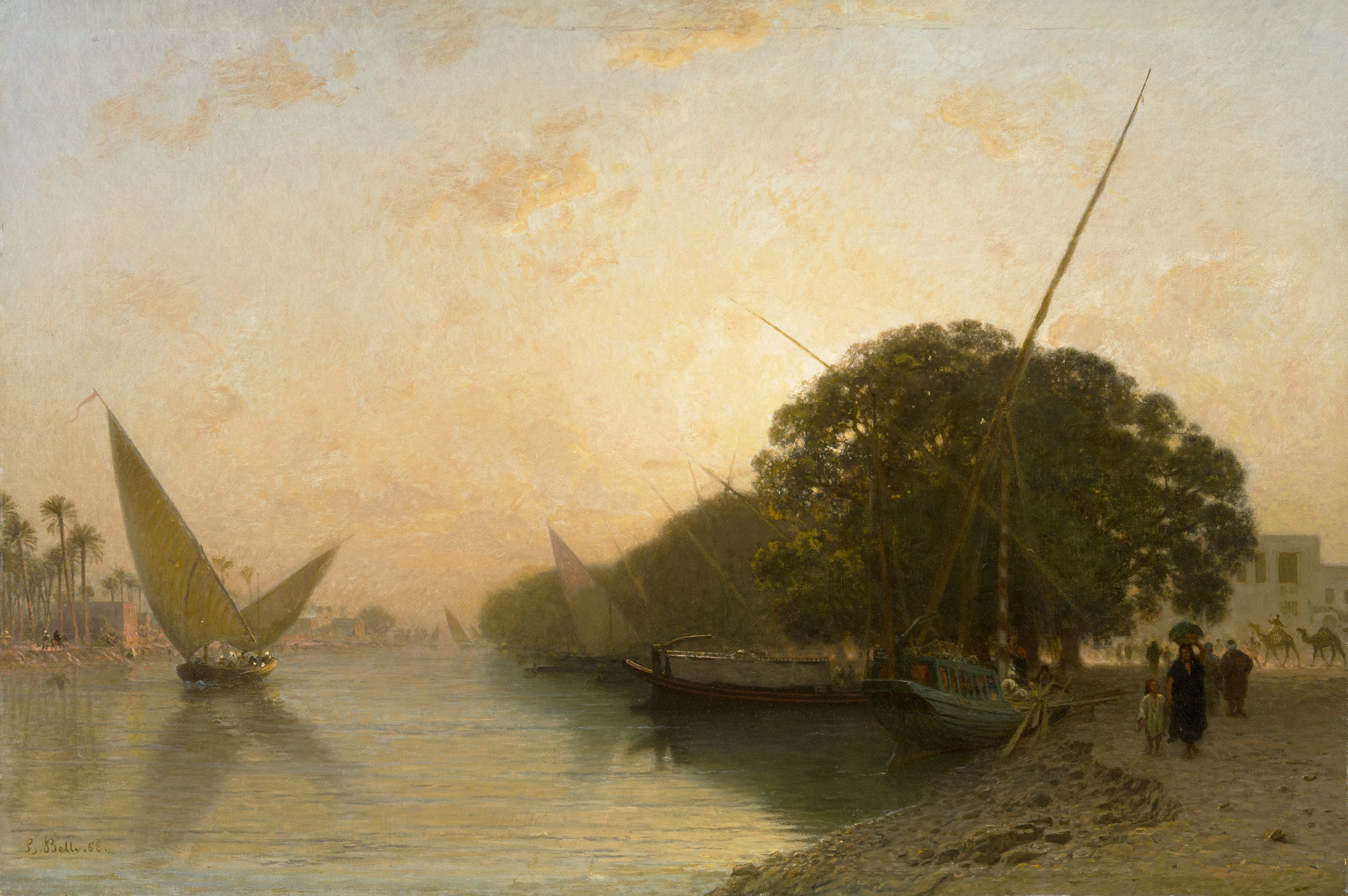
Canal de Mahmoudieh à Alexandrie le soir, Egypte by Léon Belly

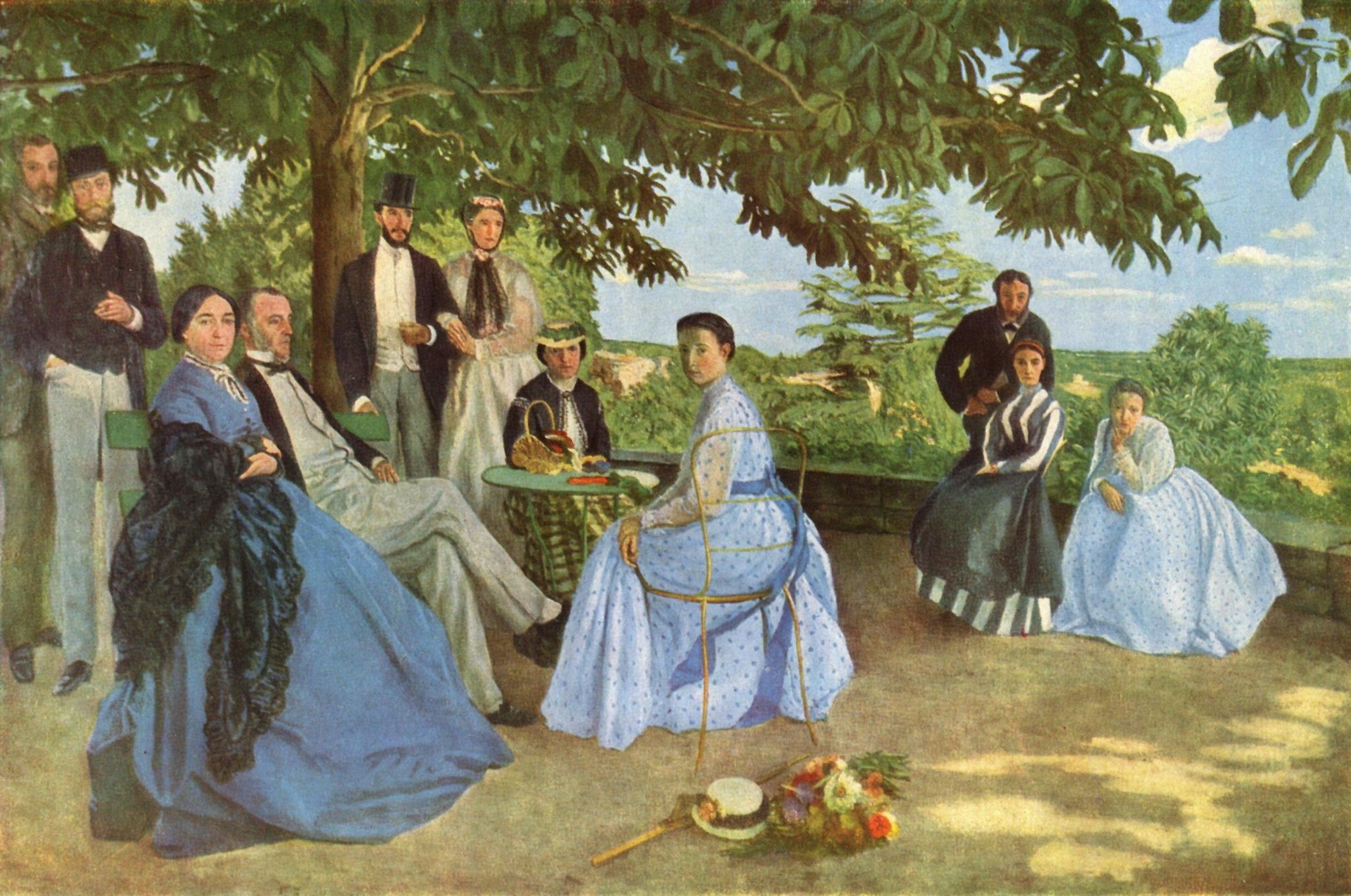
The Family Reunion by Frédéric Bazille

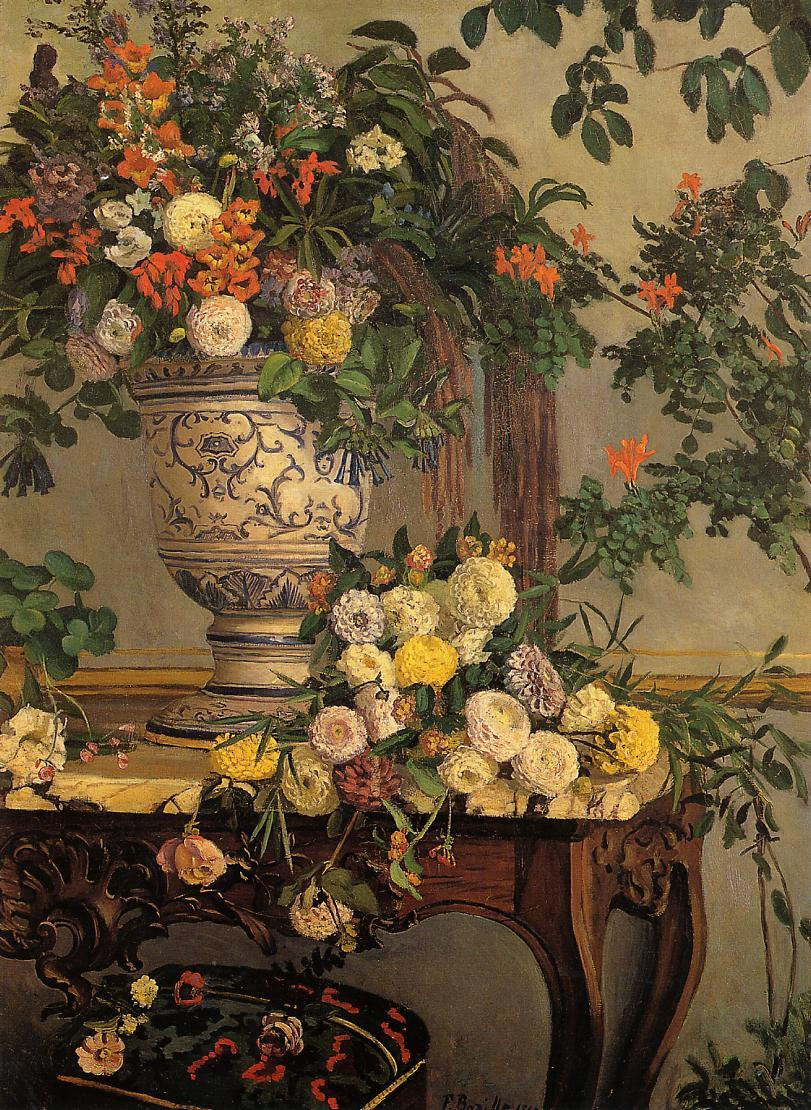
Flowers by Frédéric Bazille

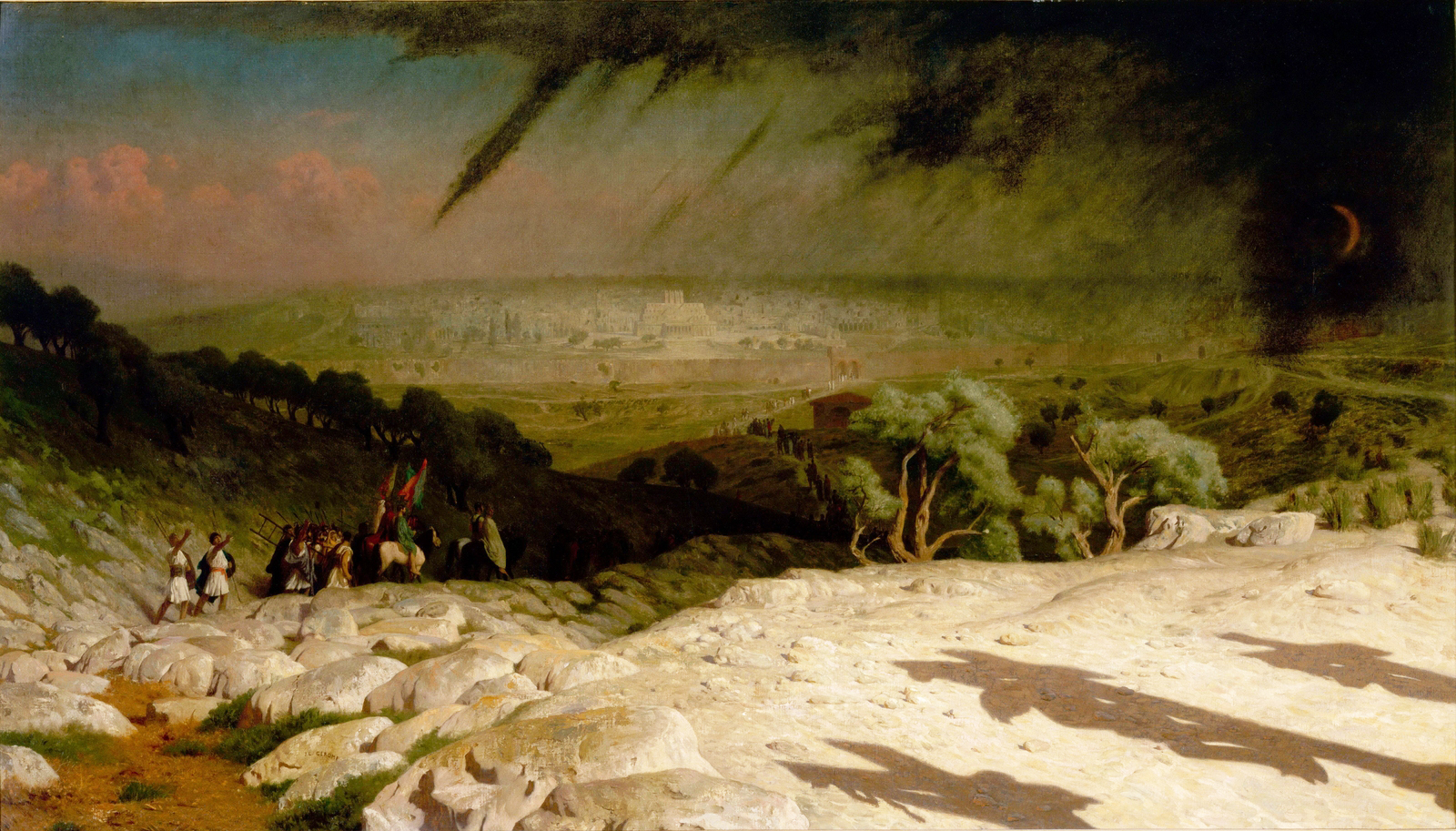
Jerusalem by Jean-Léon Gérôme

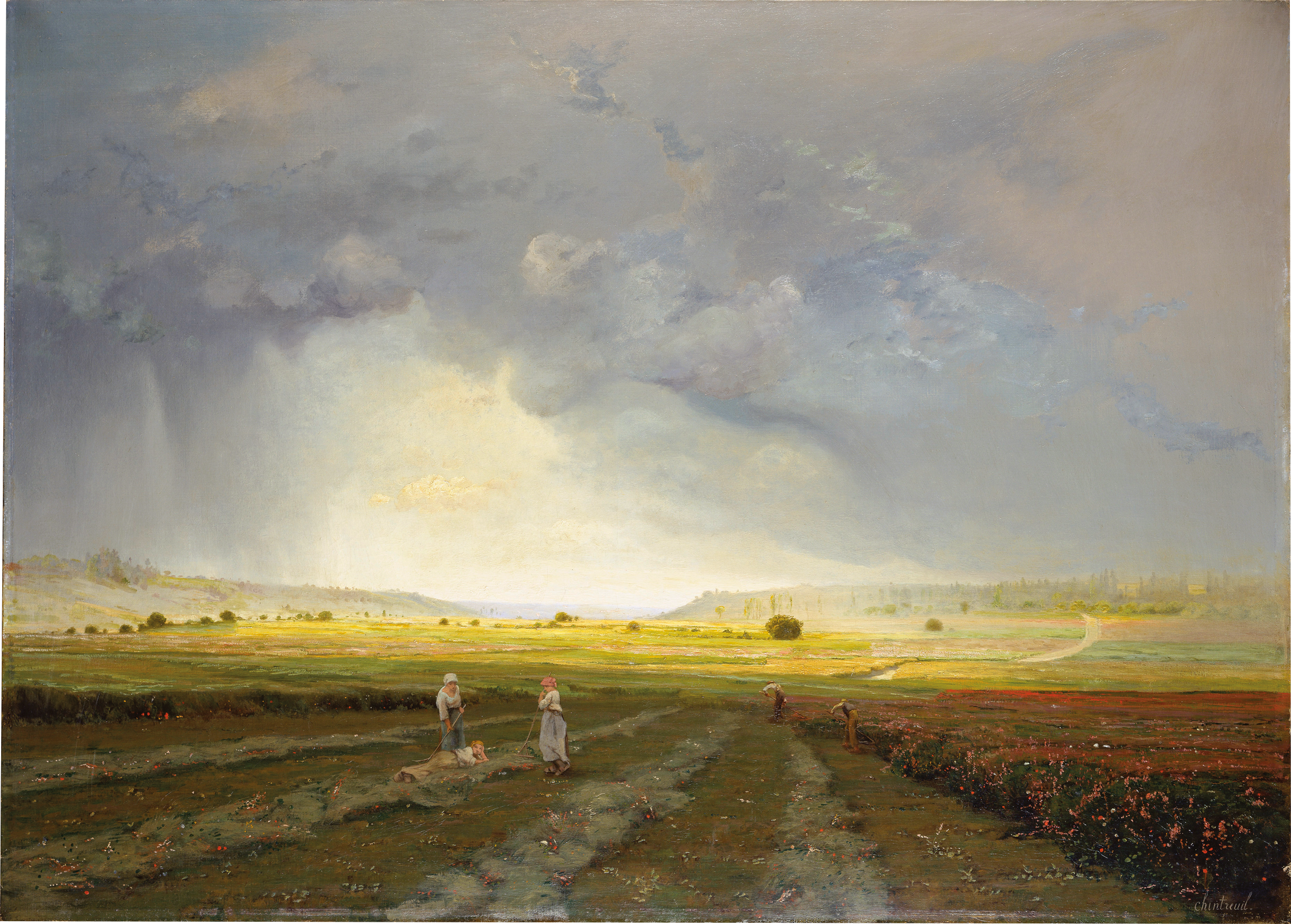
The Rain Shower by Antoine Chintreuil

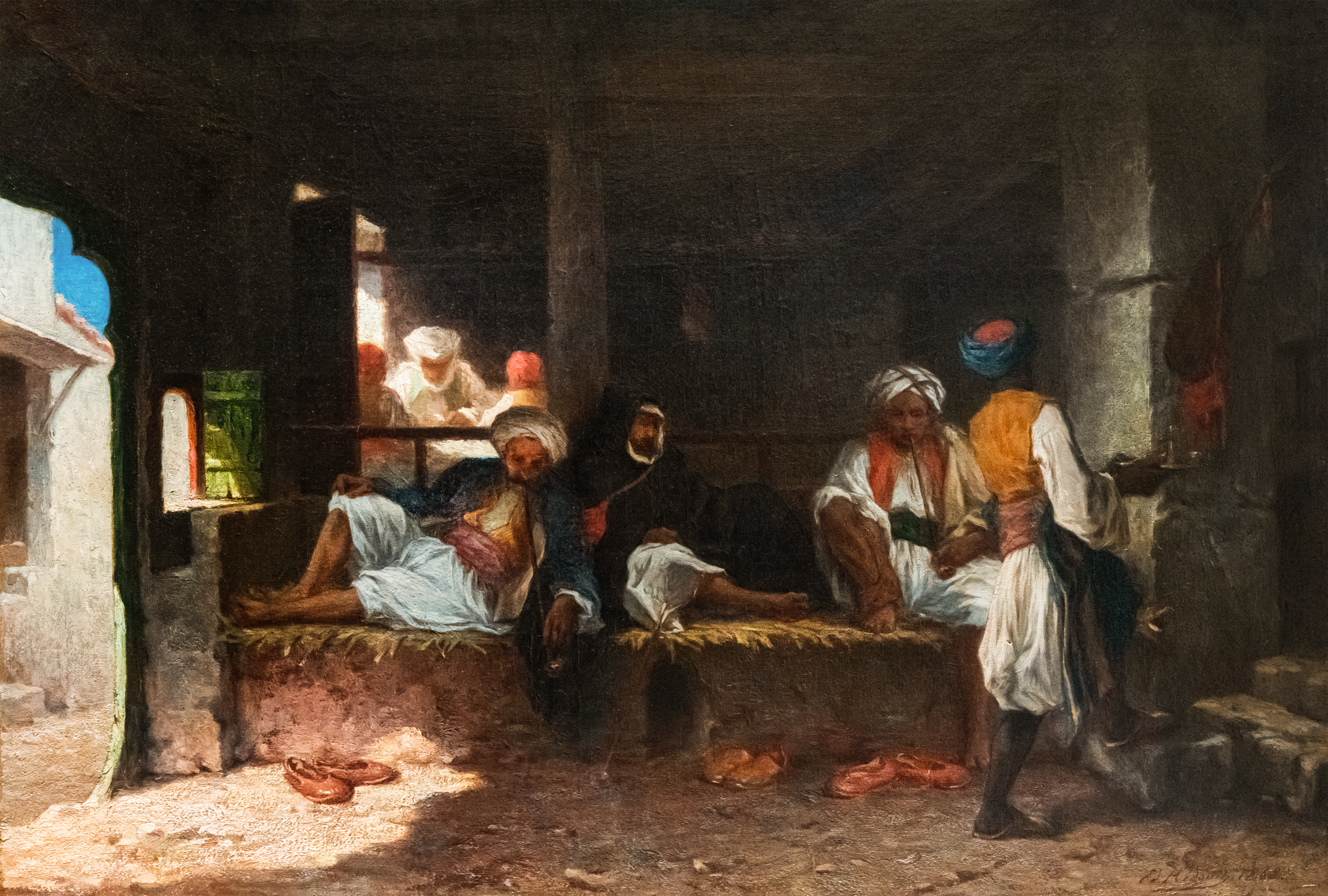
Café in Constantine by Edmond Hédouin

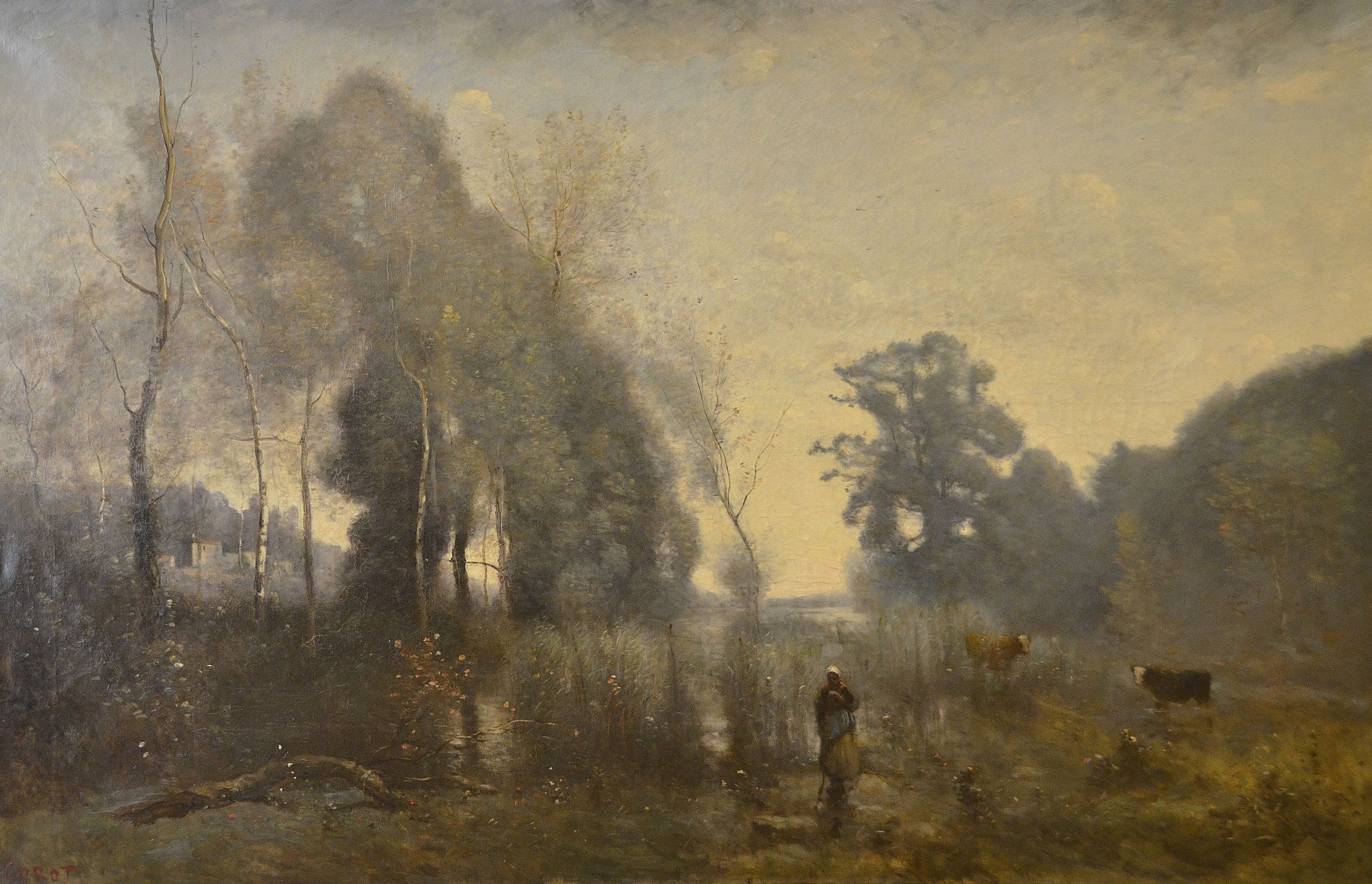
Un matin à Ville d'Avray by Jean-Baptiste-Camille Corot

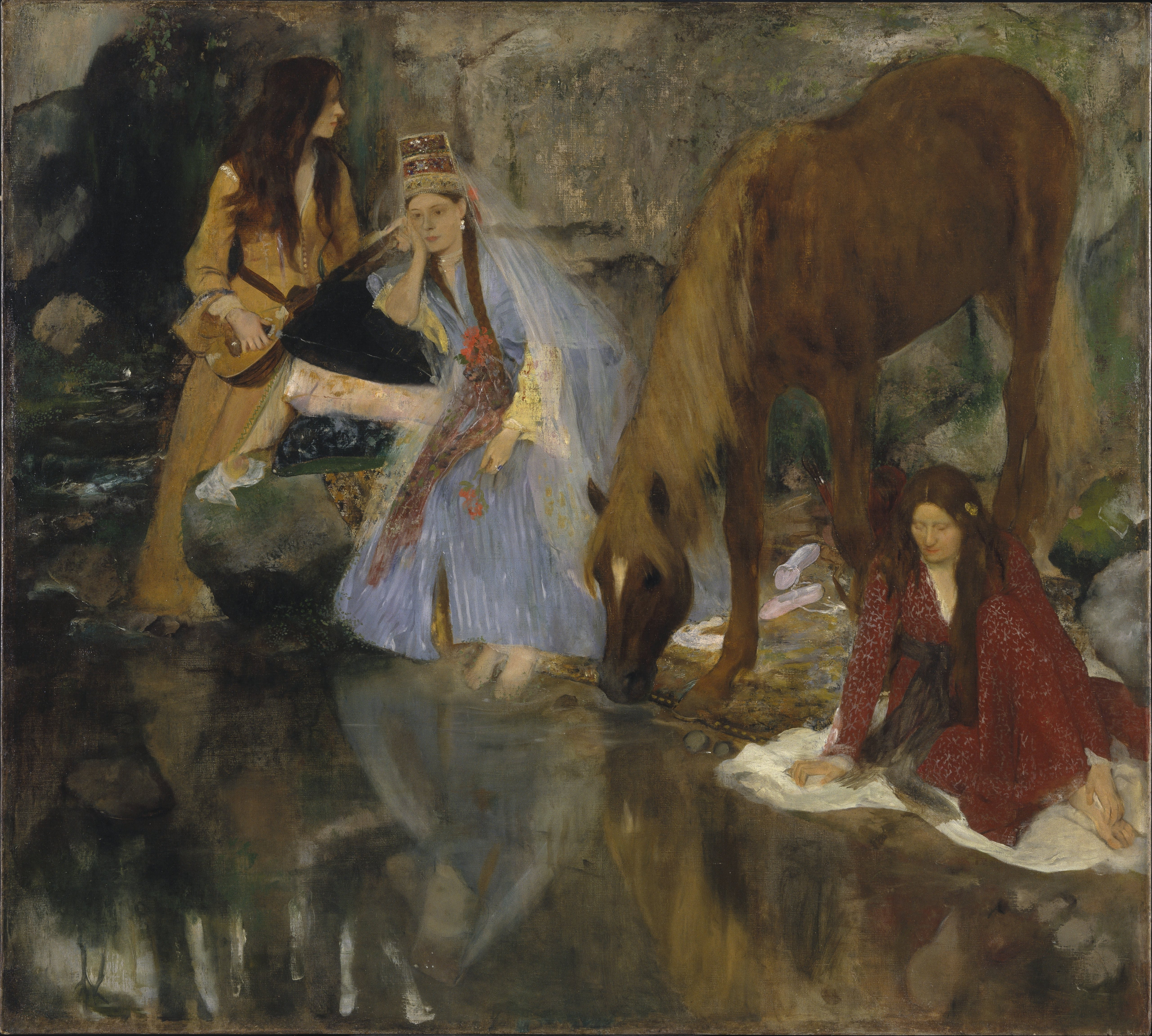
Portrait of Mlle Fiocre in the Ballet "La Source" by Edgar Degas

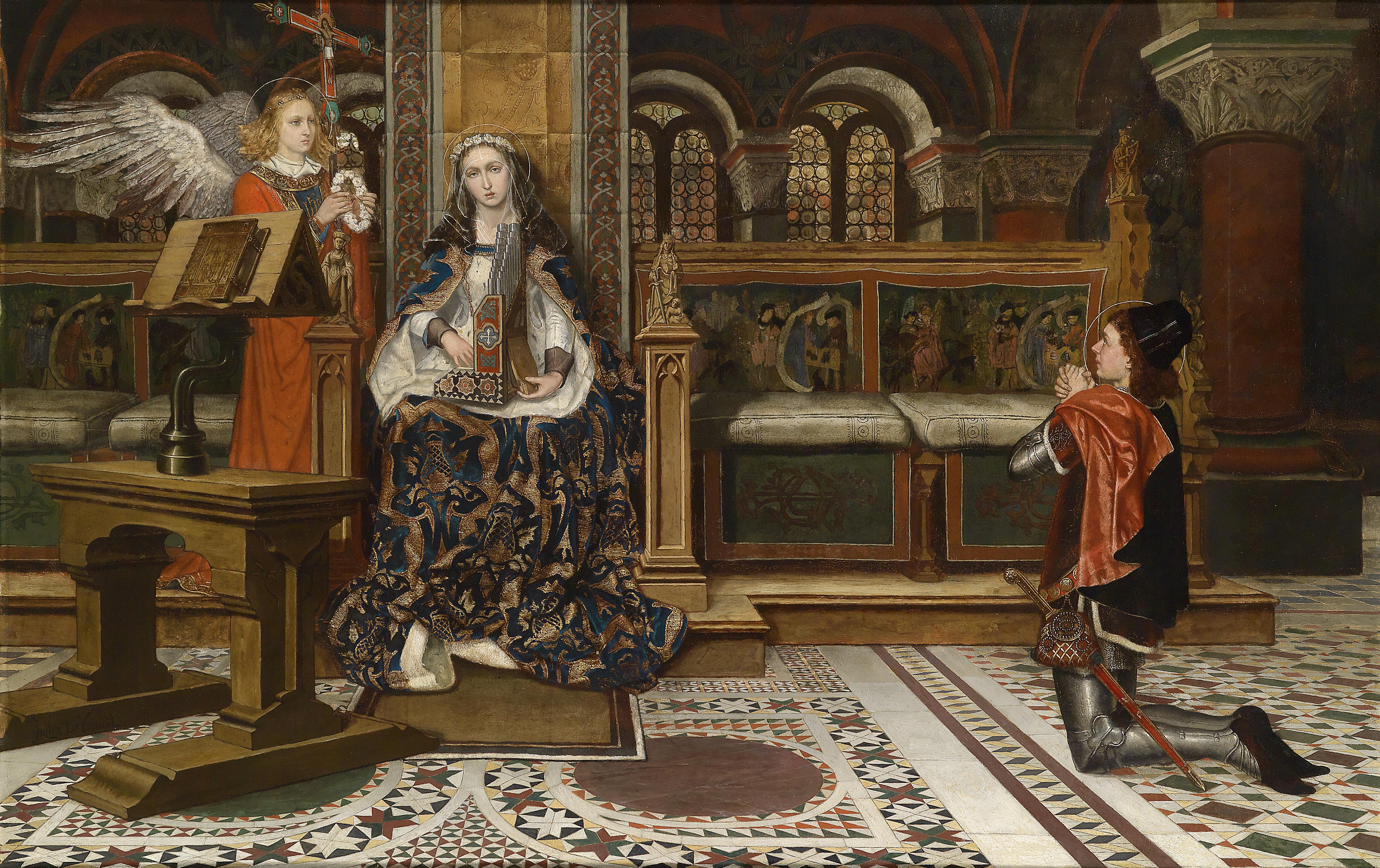
Valérien en adoration devant Sainte Cécile by Juliaan De Vriendt

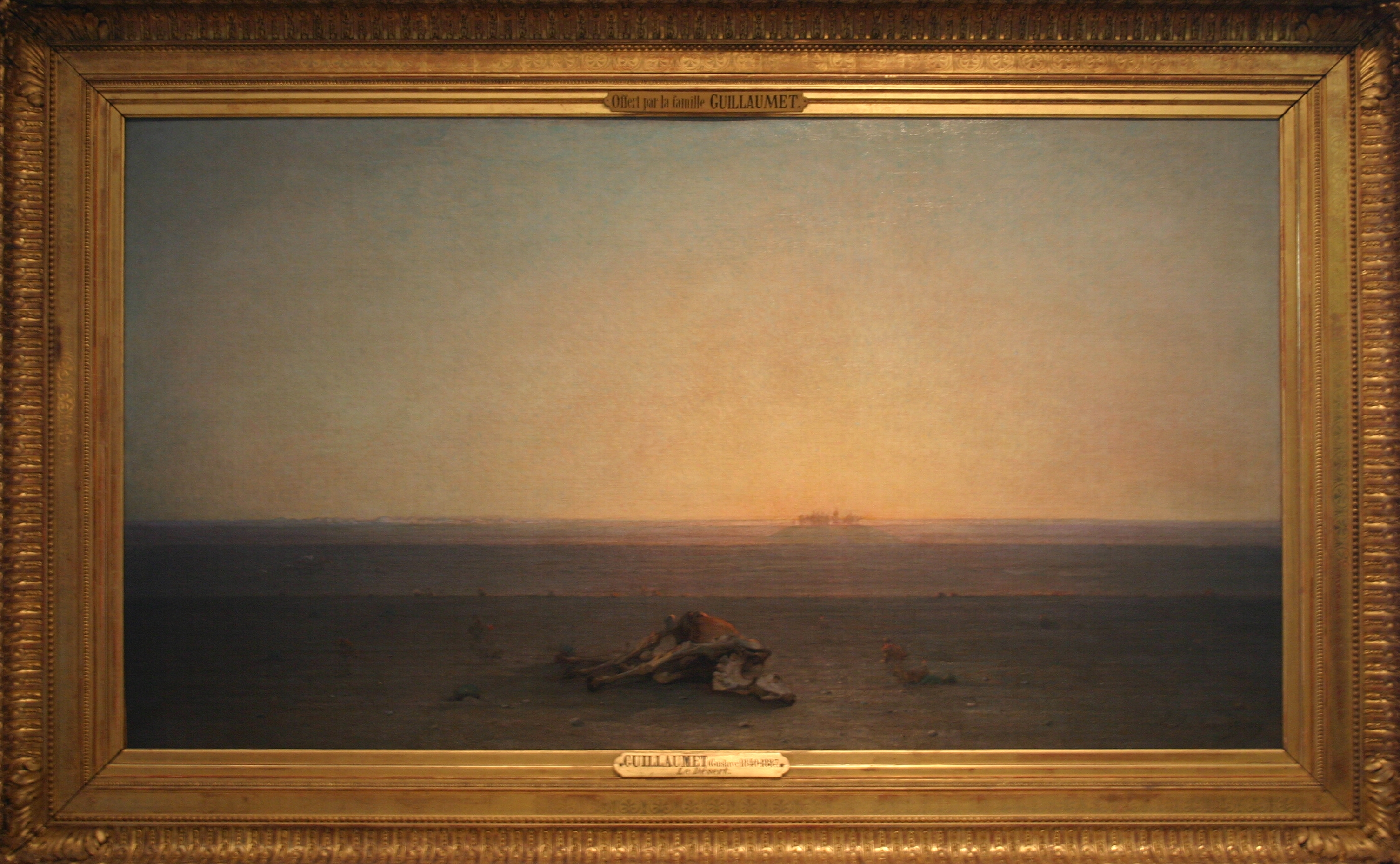
The Sahara by Gustave Achille Guillaumet

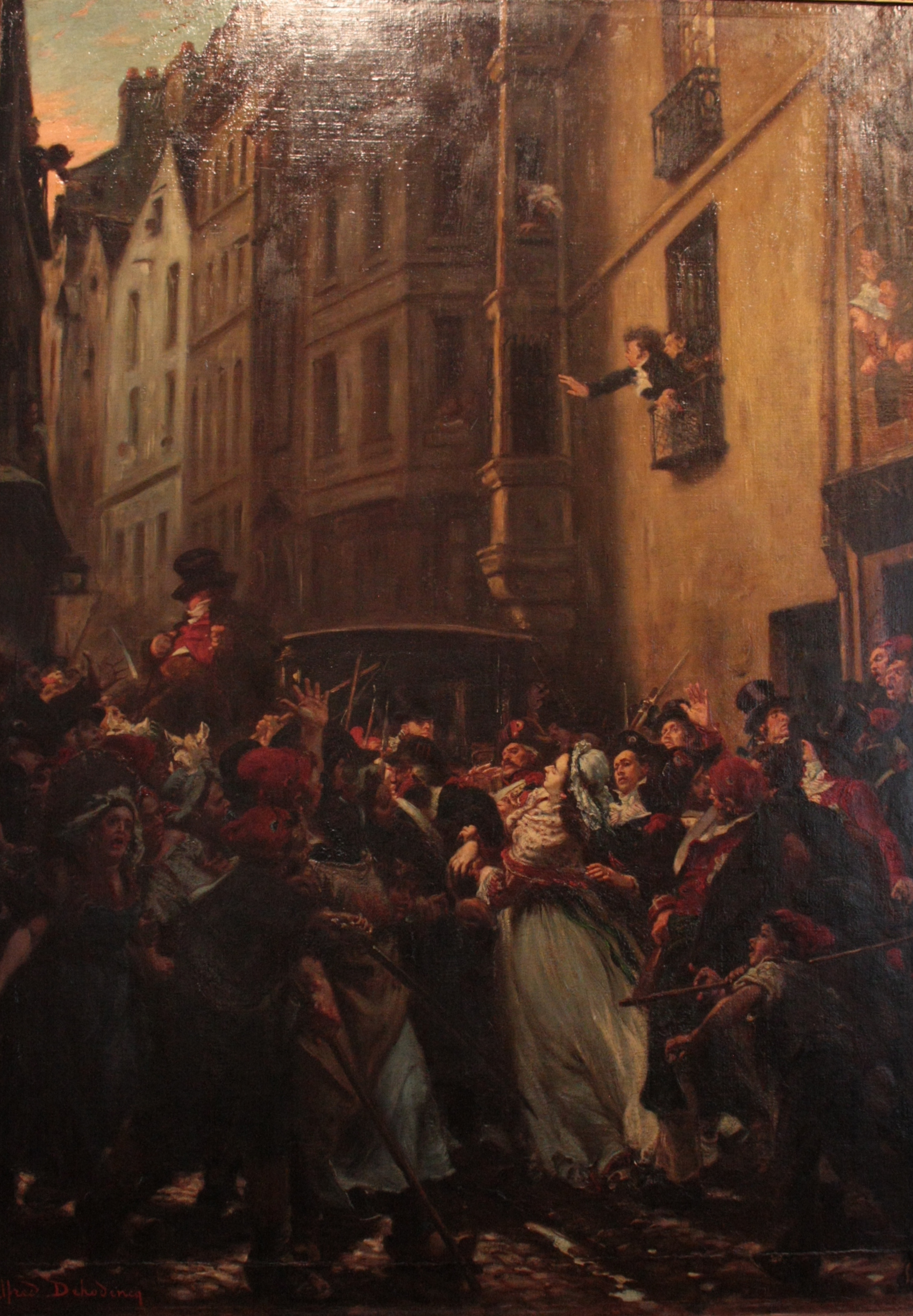
The Arrest of Charlotte Corday by Alfred Dehodencq

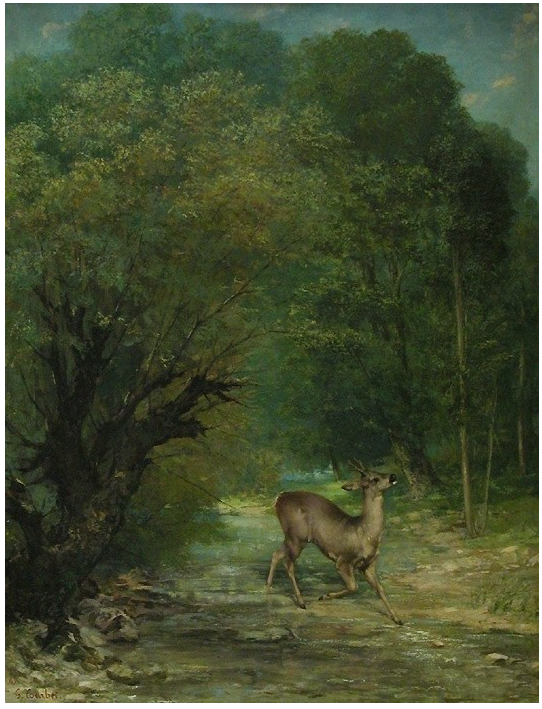
Le Chevreuil chassé aux écoutes, printemps by Gustave Courbet

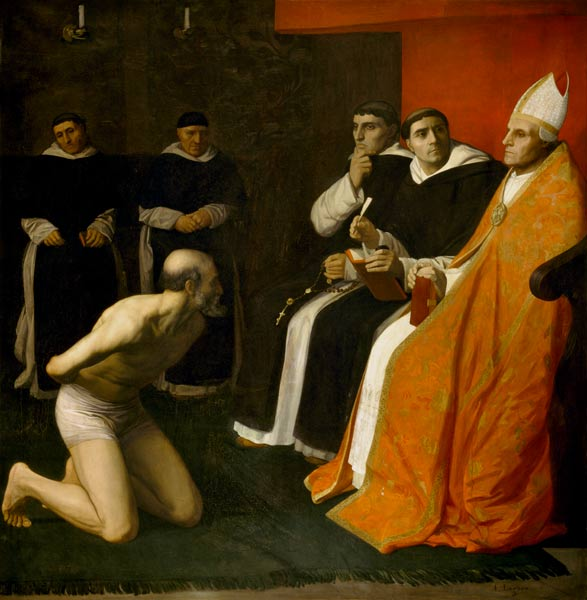
Une amende honorable by Alphonse Legros

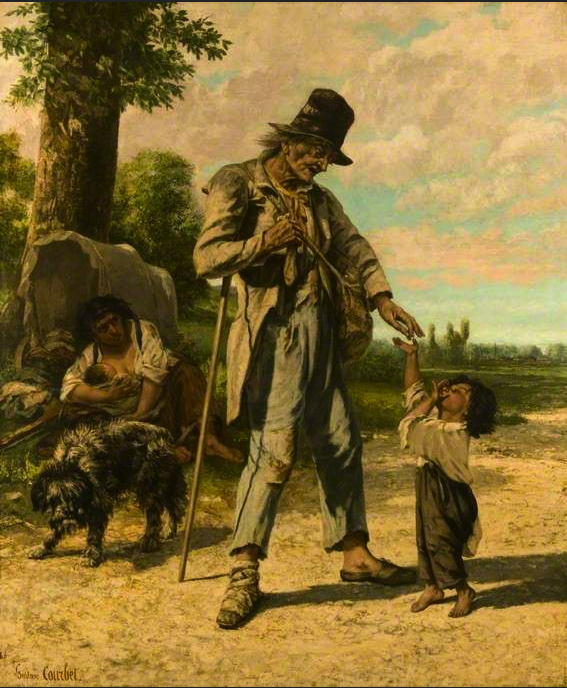
L'Aumône d'un mendiant à Ornans by Gustave Courbet

Portrait of Ziba Nubarian by Félix Auguste Clément

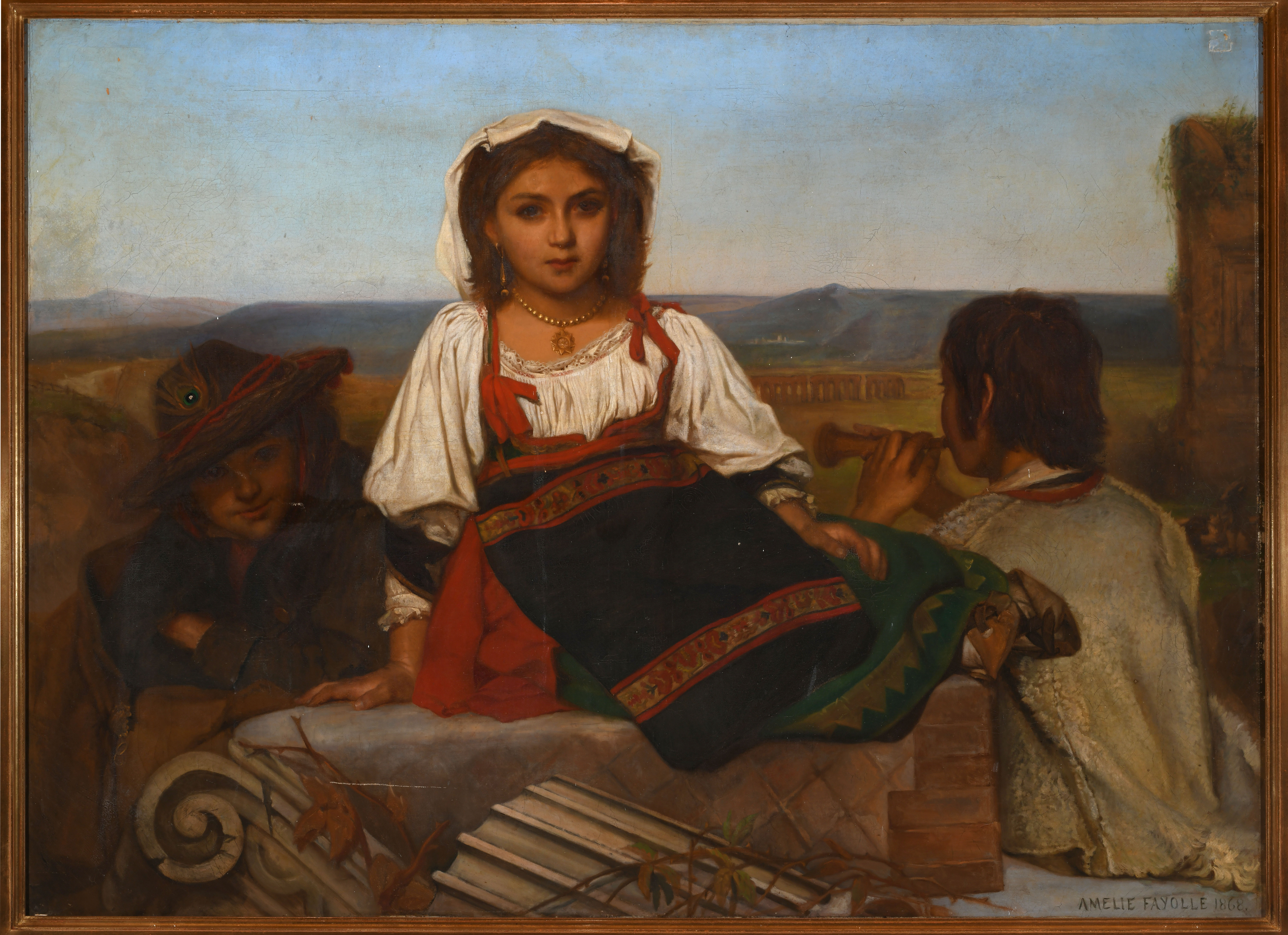
Jeunes pâtres romains by Amélie Léonie Fayolle

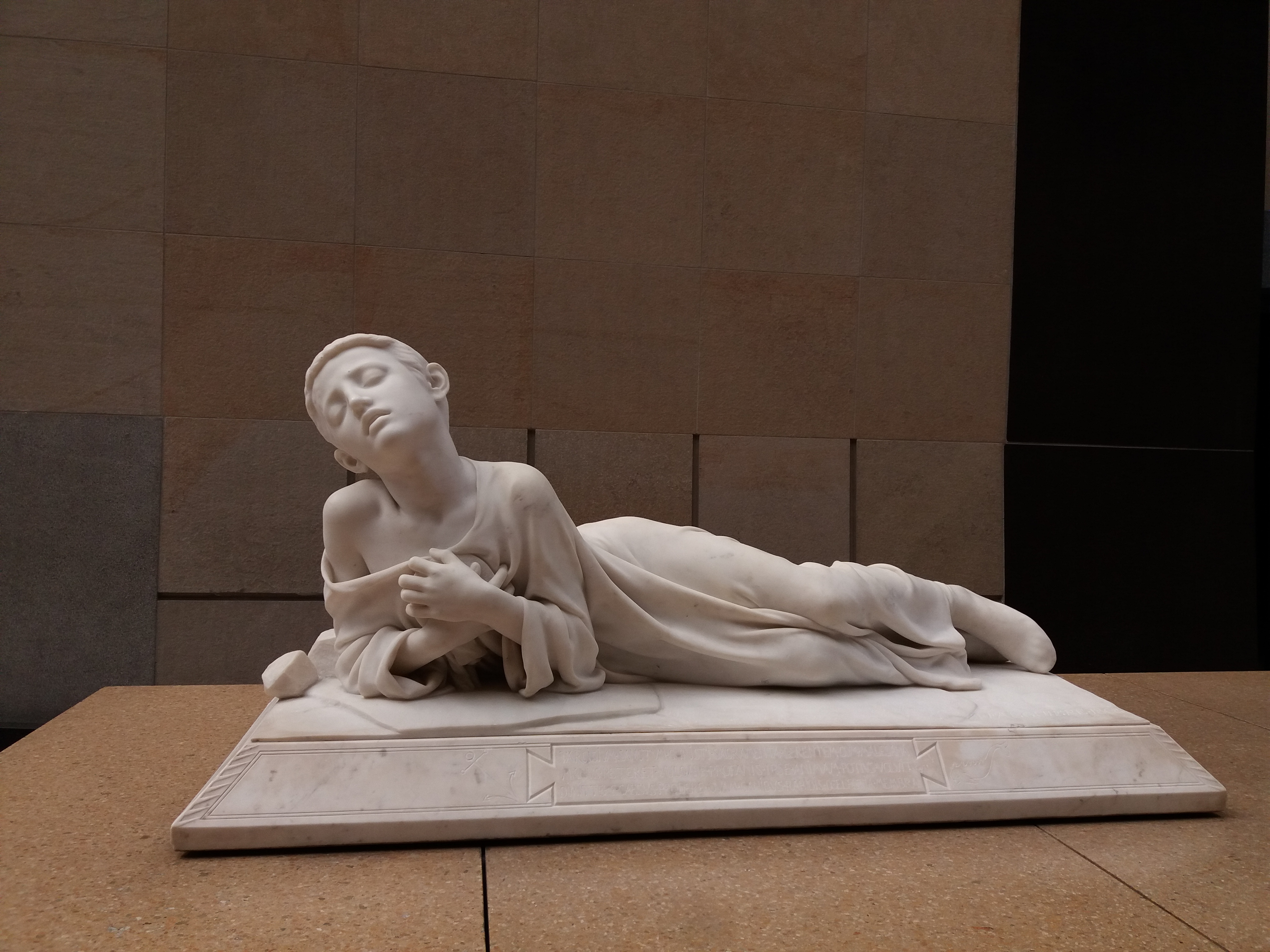
Tarcisius by Alexandre Falguière

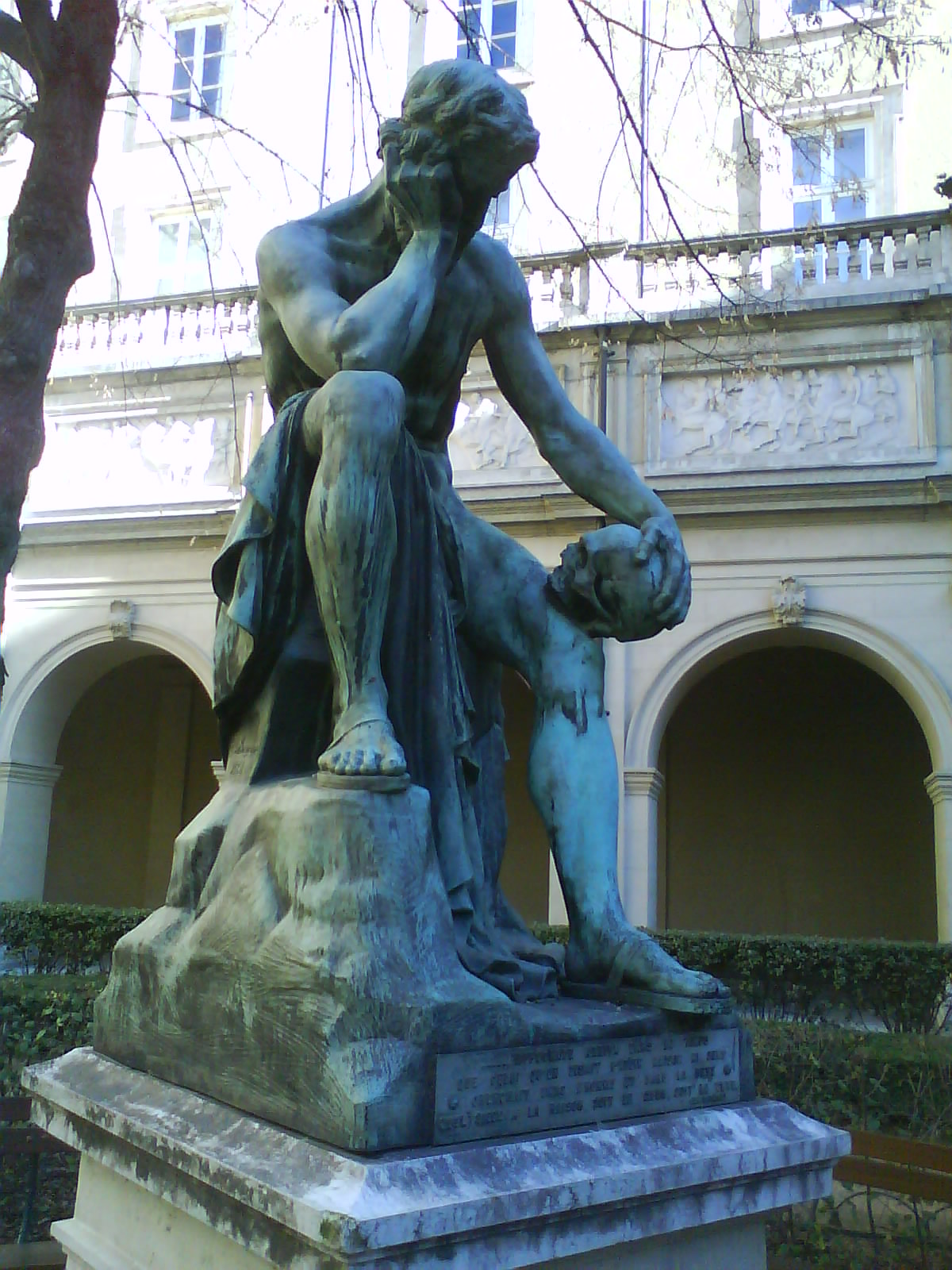
Democritus Meditating on the Seat of the Soul by Léon-Alexandre Delhomme

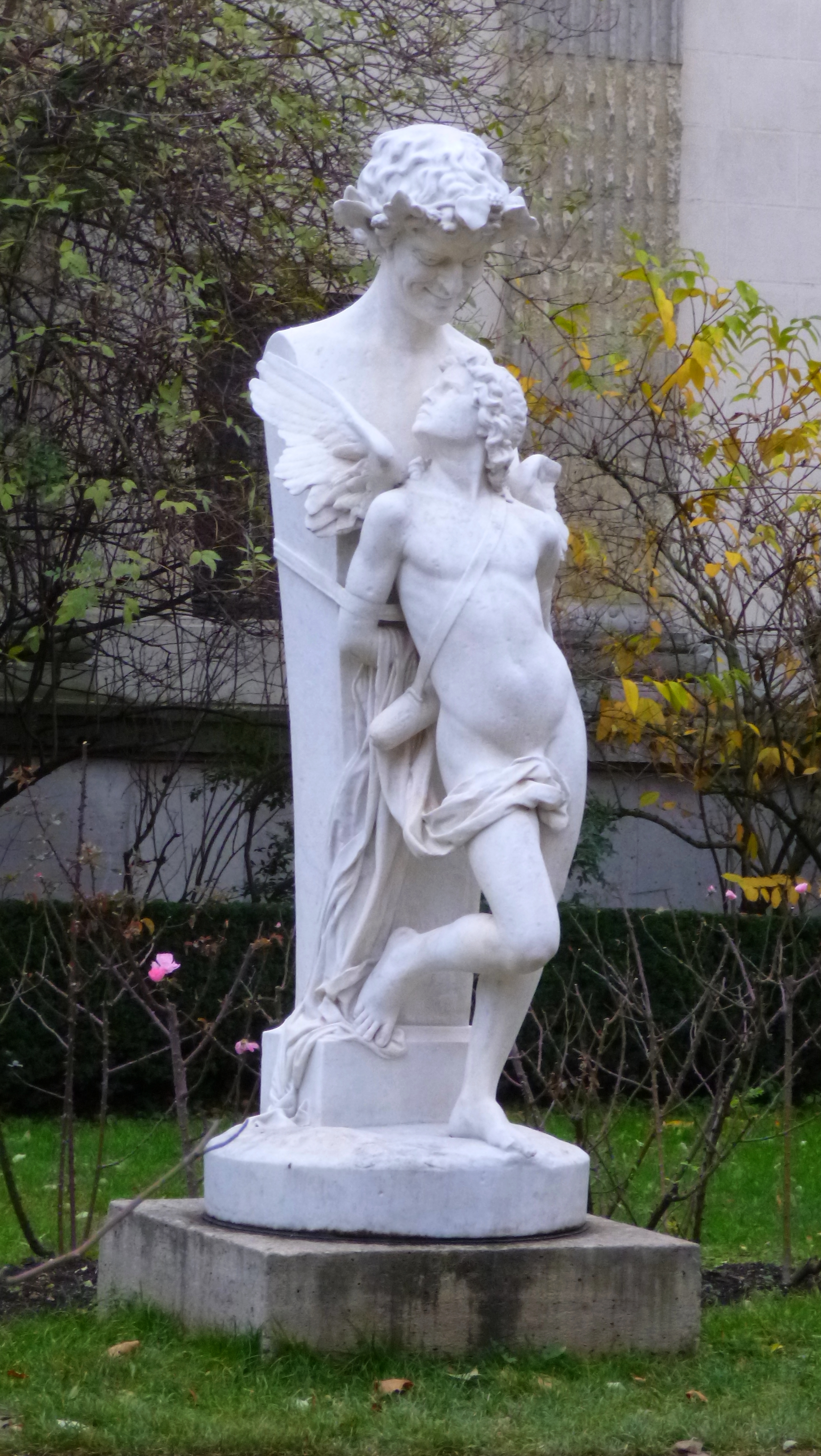
L'Amour captif by Félix Sanzel

== See also ==
- Royal Academy Exhibition of 1868, held at the National Gallery in London

== Bibliography ==
- Allard, Sébastien, Loyrette, Henri & Des Cars, Laurence. Nineteenth Century French Art: From Romanticism to Impressionism, Post-Impressionism and Art Nouveau. Rizzoli International Publications, 2007.
- Brauer, Fae. Rivals and Conspirators: The Paris Salons and the Modern Art Centre. Cambridge Scholars Publishing, 2014.
- Tinterow, Gary & Lacambre, Geneviève. Manet/Velázquez: The French Taste for Spanish Painting. Metropolitan Museum of Art, 2003.
