= Gustave Achille Guillaumet =

French artist (1840–1887)

Gustave Guillaumet
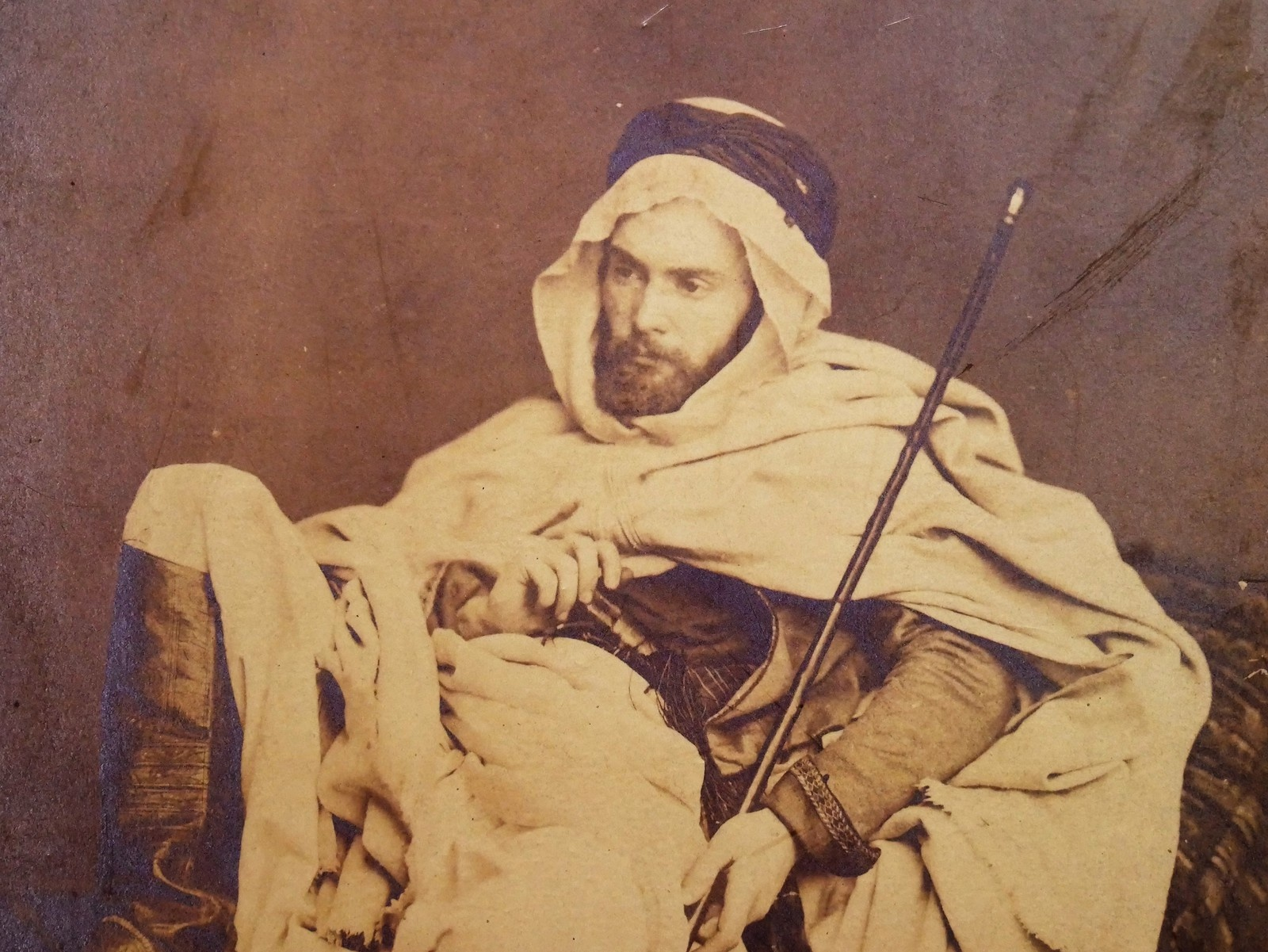
- Born: Puteaux, Paris, France
- Died: Paris, France
- Education: École des Beaux-Arts
- Known for: Painting, Writing
- Movement: Orientalism

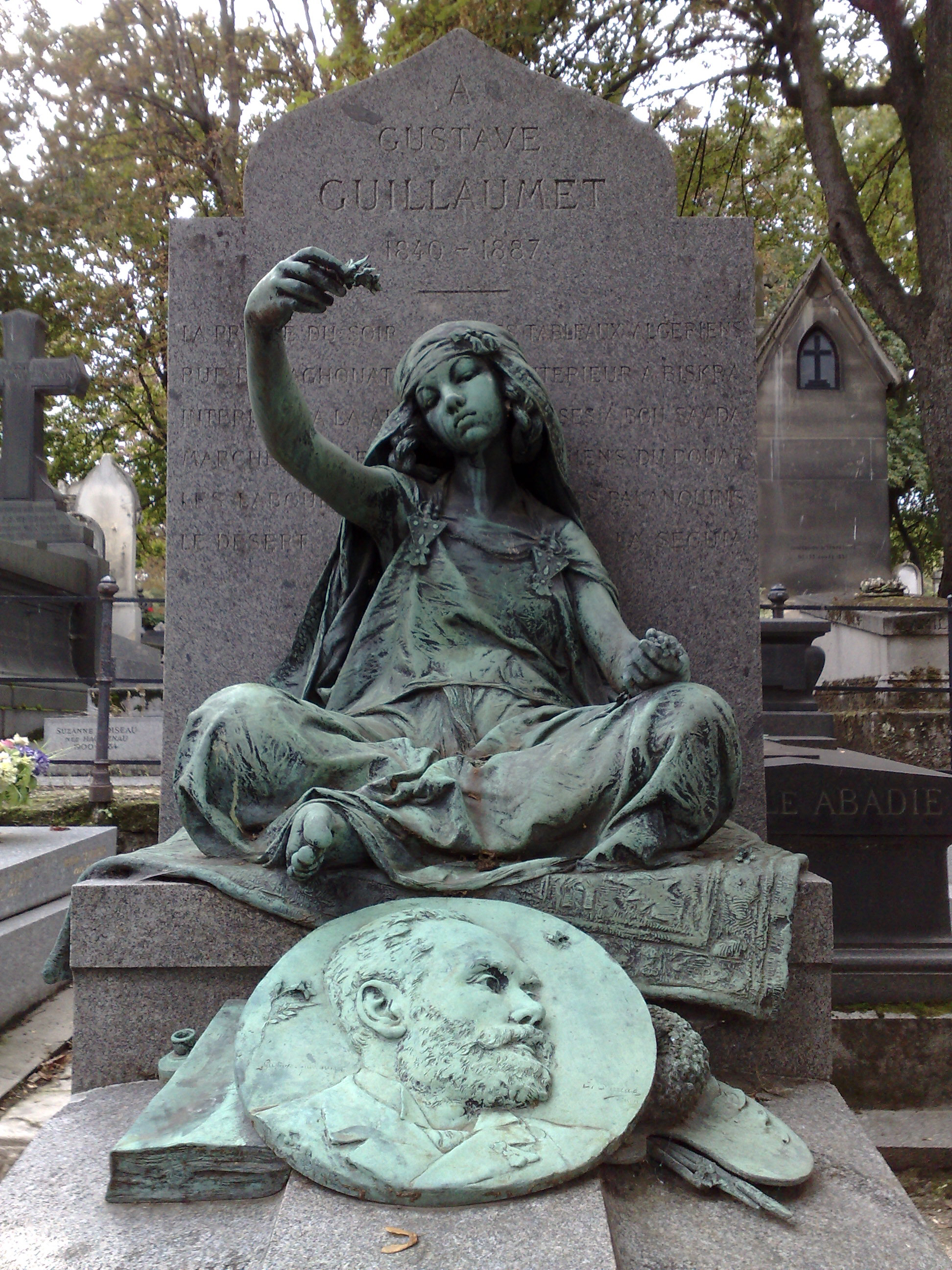
Guillaumet's tomb in Montmartre Cemetery, Paris

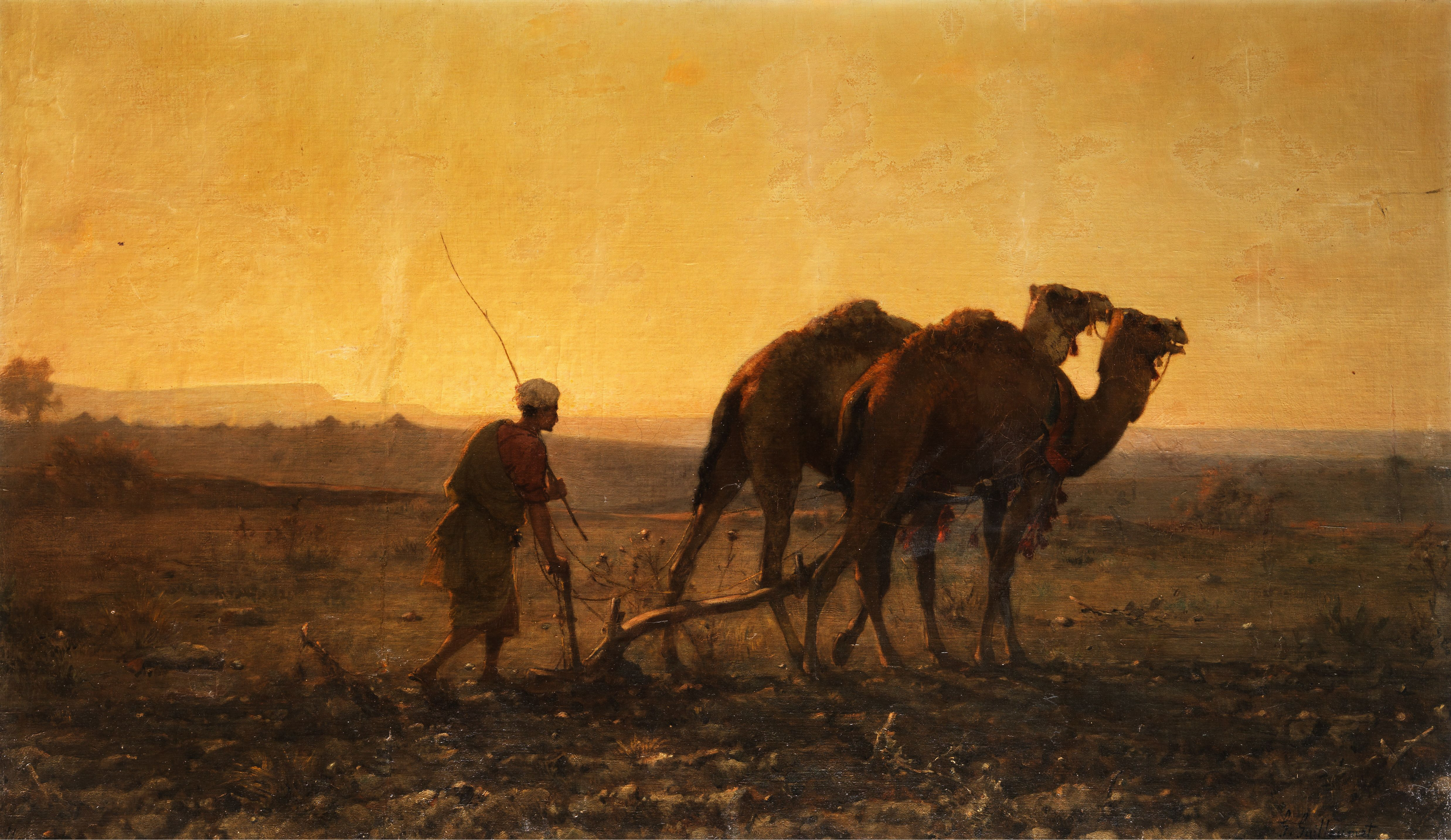
Arab Ploughing with Camels in the Evening Landscape, 1861

Gustave Achille Guillaumet (French: [ɡystav ɡijomɛ]; 26 March 1840 – 14 March 1887) was a French painter. He is best known for his paintings of North Africa.

== Early life ==
Gustave Guillaumet was born in 1840 in Puteaux (now in the Hauts-de-Seine, Paris).

== Career ==
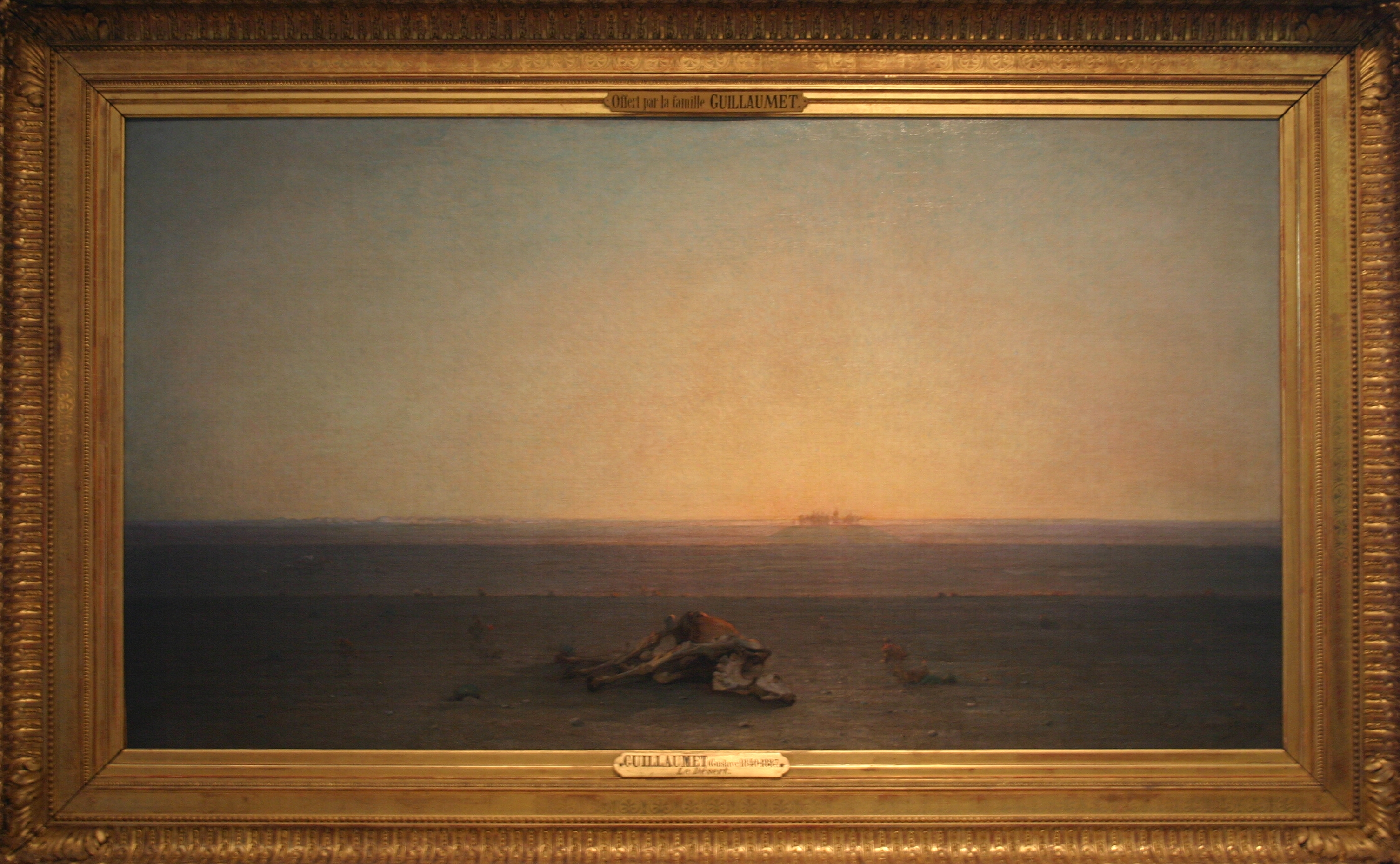
Le Sahara

Guillaumet was initially a student of François-Edouard Picot and Félix-Joseph Barrias. In 1857 he joined the École nationale supérieure des Beaux-Arts in Paris where he became a student of Alexandre Abel de Pujol.

In 1861 Guillaumet entered the Historical Landscape category of the Prix de Rome for a scholarship to study at the Academy of France in Rome. On failing to win, he instead travelled across the Mediterranean to Algeria, in north Africa. While there he contracted malaria and had to spend three months at the military hospital in Biskra.

Guillaumet visited Algeria ten times between 1861 and 1867. He preferred to travel in the south and many of his works depict the life of the people of the desert.

Whereas Orientalism generally gave a deliberately idealised or anecdotal picture of north Africa, Guillaumet's work was notable for portraying the harshness of life in a desert region. The Sahara features the carcass of a camel in the foreground with a caravan – or mirage of one – on the horizon and empty desert in-between. It was first exhibited to considerable success at the Salon of 1868.

Between 1879 and 1884 La Nouvelle Revue published tableaux of Algerian scenes collected together by Guillaumet. These were later published as a book, Tableaux Algériens. It includes twelve etchings by Guillaumet, Courtry, Paul Edmé Le Rat, Adolphe-Alphonse Géry-Bichard, August Müller and Toussaint; six photogravures by Dujardin and one hundred and twenty-eight engravings in relief from drawings and sketches by Guillaumet, himself. The book was published in 1888, after Guillaumet's death and is prefaced by a note on his life by Eugène Mouton.

In 1878, Guillaumet was made a Knight of the Legion of Honour, the highest decoration in France.

== Personal life ==
His son Gustave Guillaume (whose family name was changed), born in 1883, became a famous linguist.

== Death ==
Guillaumet died in Paris in 1887. Speculation about the circumstances of his death, supposedly of peritonitis, was published in The New York Times on 6 April. The article claimed that Guillaumet had left his wife and son to live with "a lady who was his senior by many years" but that a few weeks before his death he had shot himself following an argument with his mistress.

"The bullet lodged in his intestines, and he lingered from that moment in the agonies of a painful illness, terminated by death. His last words after the bullet had entered his body were for his wife and son, who, on being informed of the tragical occurrence, came and nursed him until his death. The painter died in his studio, whither he was carried at his own request. He wanted to see his Oriental sketches for the last time."

— unattributed, The New York Times, April 6, 1887

Guilaumet is buried in Montmartre Cemetery. His tomb bears a sculpture by Louis-Ernest Barrias of a Young girl from Bou Saâda, dropping flowers onto a portrait of Guillaumet embossed on a medallion.

== Paintings ==
- Arab Ploughing with Camels in the Evening Landscape, 1861
- The Oasis, 1862
- Evening Prayer in the Sahara, 1863, exhibited at the Salon of 1863 (Musée d'Orsay)
- The Sahara, also known as The Desert, 1867 (Musée d'Orsay)
- Laghouat, Algerian Sahara, 1879, exhibited at the Salon of 1879 (Musée d'Orsay)
- Saharan Dwelling, near Biskra, Algeria, 1882 (Chrysler Museum of Art)
- Dogs of the Douar Devouring a Dead Horse in the Gorges of El Kantar, 1883
- Irrigation Channel, near Biskra, Algeria, 1884, exhibited at the Salon of 1885 (Musée d'Orsay)
- Mountains in North Africa, with a Bedouin Camp (The National Gallery)
- Weavers of Bou-Saada, exhibited at the Salon of 1885 (Musée d'Orsay)
- Inside Bou-Saâda (Musée d'Orsay)
- Flute Players in bivouac, location Musée d'Orsay Salle des Orientalist

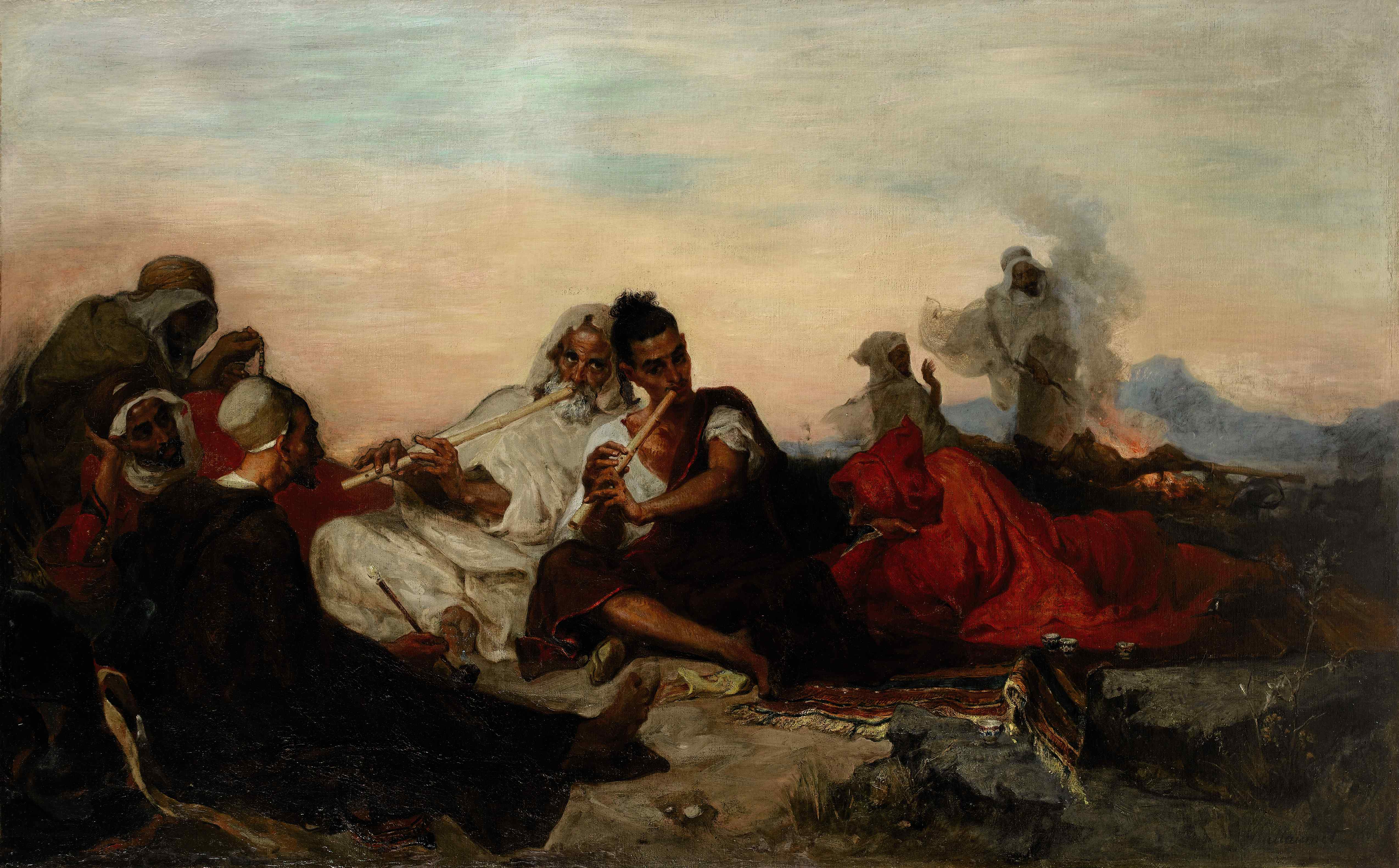
Les Joueurs de Flûte au Bivouac, Algérie 1866

== Selected works ==
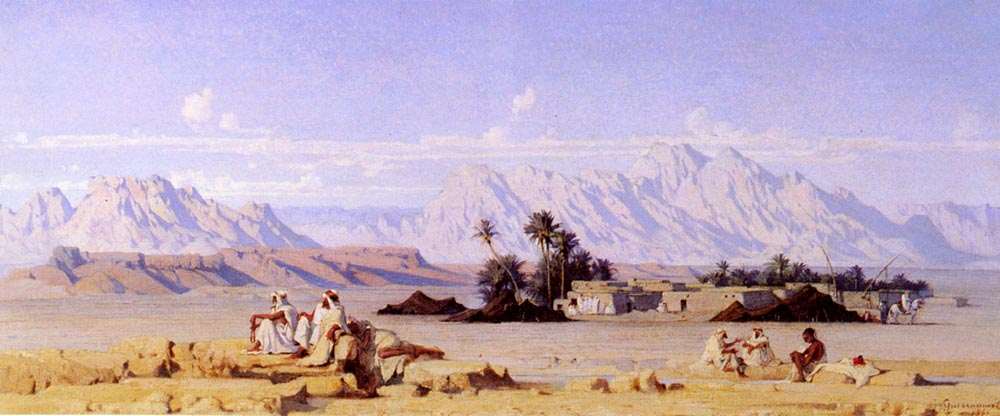
The Oasis, 1862

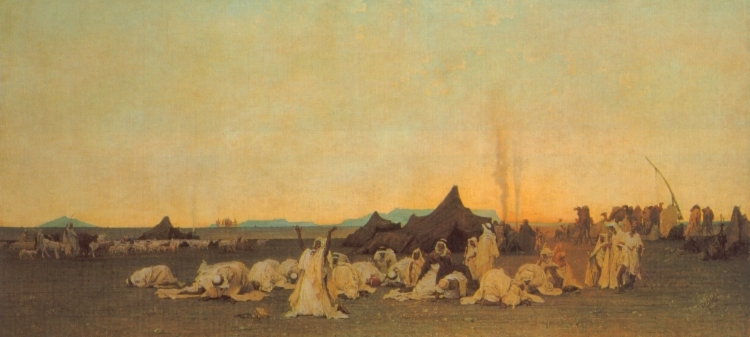
Evening Prayer in the Sahara, 1863 (Musée d'Orsay)

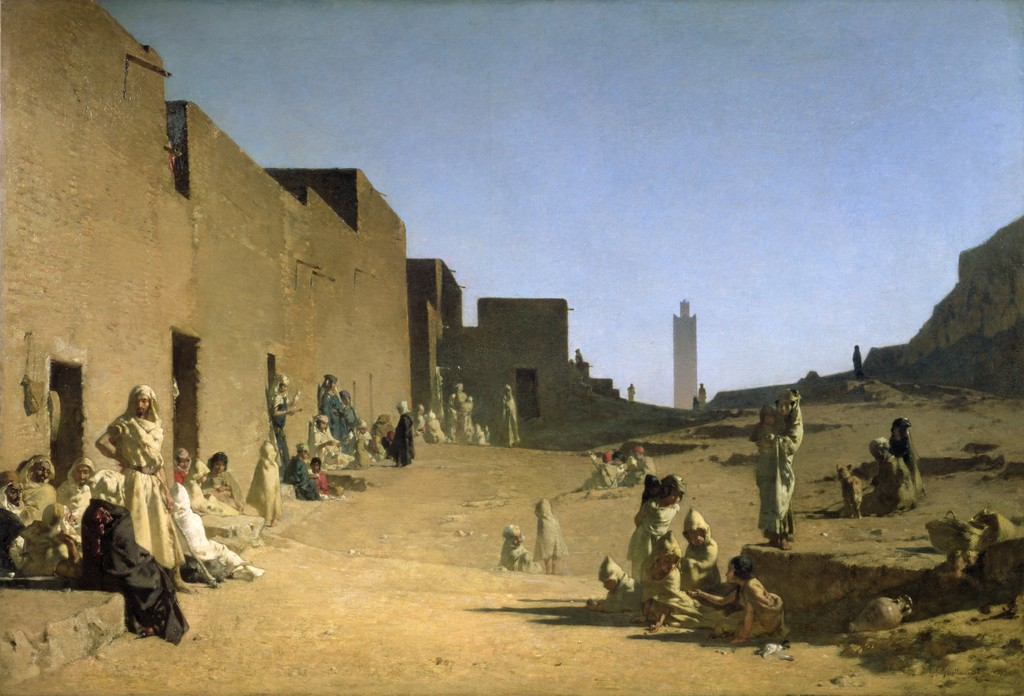
Laghouat, Algerian Sahara, 1879 (Musée d'Orsay)

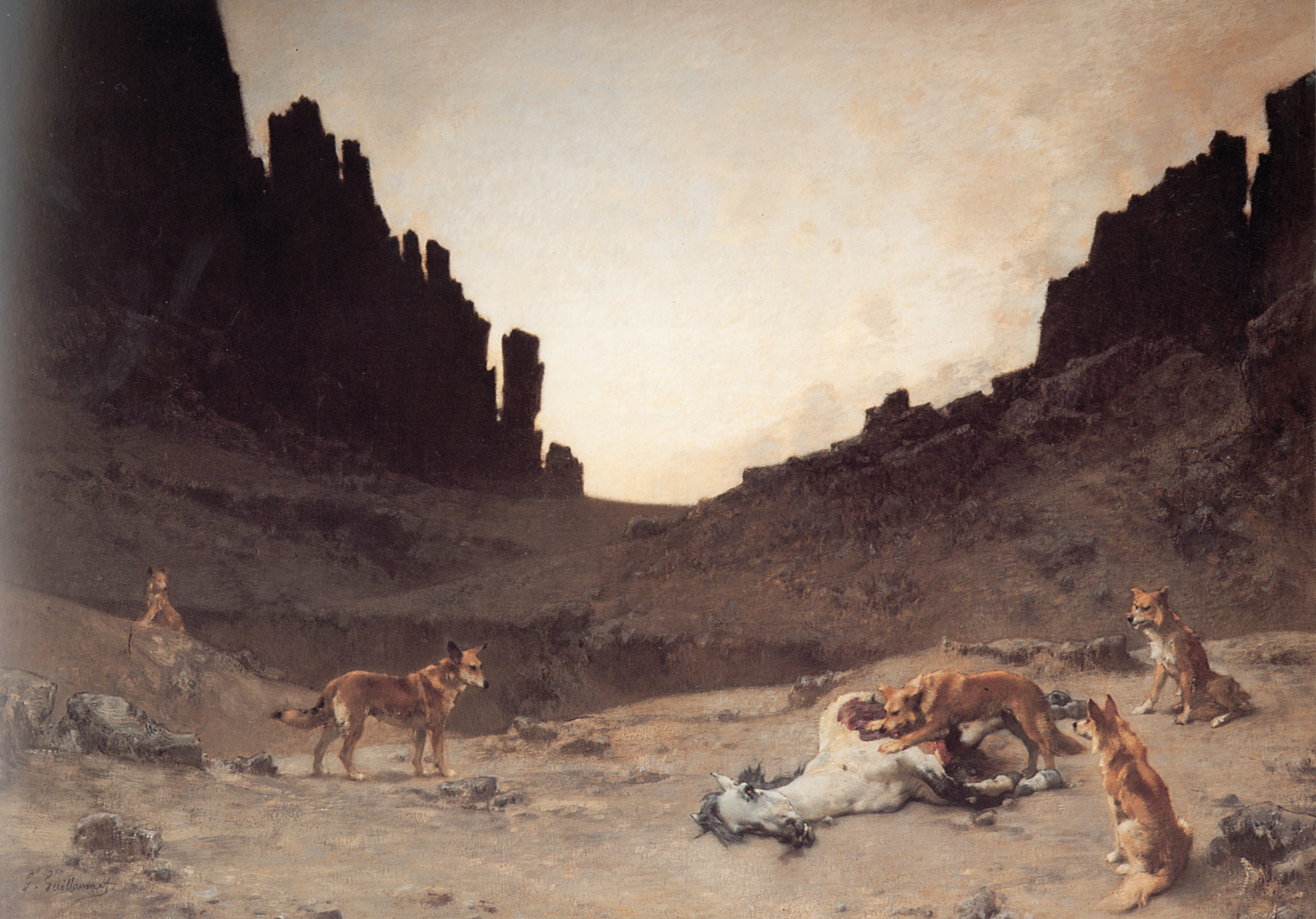
Dogs of the Douar Devouring a Dead Horse in the Gorges of El Kantar, 1883

== See also ==
- List of Orientalist artists
- Orientalism
