= The Sahara (Guillaumet) =

Painting by Gustave Guillaumet

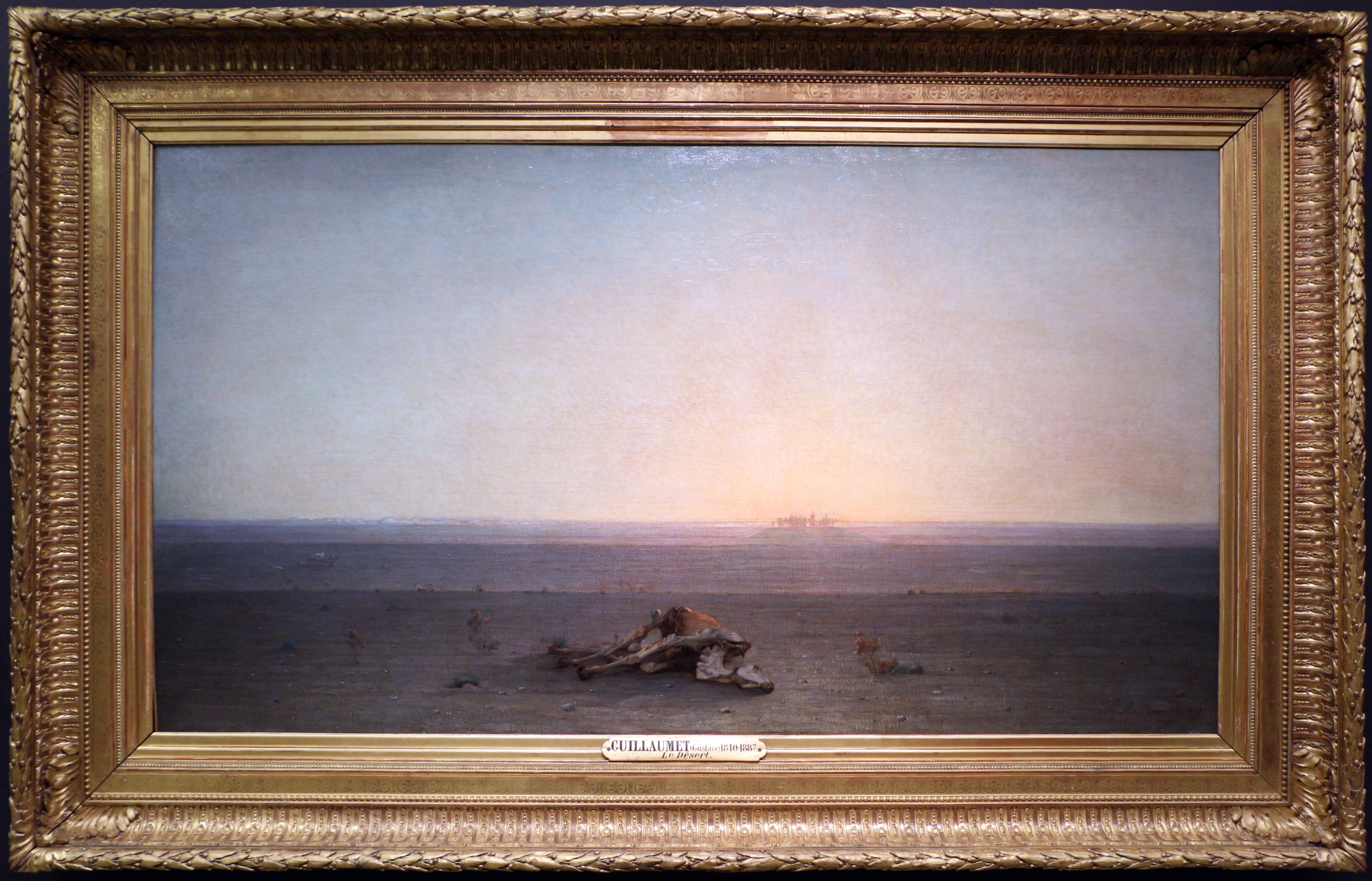
Gustave Guillaumet, The Sahara

The Sahara (French: le Sahara), sometimes also referred to as The Desert (French: le Desert) is an oil painting by Gustave Guillaumet. It was first exhibited at the Salon of 1868 and is now in the Musée d'Orsay.

== Provenance ==
Until 1888 the painting was part of the collection of the heirs of Gustave Guillaumet. In that year it was accepted by the French state as a gift and until 1896 it was kept at the Musée du Luxembourg. It was then briefly transferred to the Louvre before returning to the Luxembourg in 1897. In 1929 it went back to the Louvre before being assigned to the Musée d'Orsay in 1980.

== Composition ==
A popular work at the Salon of 1868, this painting is unlike most contemporary Orientalist pieces. Whereas many of these depicted an idealized or anecdotal picture of North Africa, this canvas focuses on the unrelentingly grim aspects of death in the desert. It renders the desert almost as an abstract, something not quite real. With a remarkable economy of means, a subtle graduation of planes which mingle the vast, dusty plain with the hazy sky, Guillaumet seeks to capture the quintessence of the desert. Despite its naturalistic details, the work has a dreamlike quality.

Guillaumet's depiction of the natural landscape shows two planes: the vast sky and the unending desert. All other elements, such as the camel skeleton in the foreground and backlit silhouette of a caravan in the distance, are secondary. The harsh landscape and the vast sky are filled with a fading sun—the artist’s preferred time to paint the sun was rising or setting.

== Exhibition history ==
- 1868 - Salon - palais des Champs Elysées - Paris
- 1888 - Exposition des oeuvres de Guillaumet - Ecole nationale supérieure des Beaux-Arts, Paris
- 1968 - Le Salon imaginaire: Bilder aus den grossen Kunstausstellungen der zweiten Hälfte des XIX. Jahrhunderts - Kunstverein - Allemagne, Berlin, 1968
- 1973 - "Equivoques": peintures françaises du XIXe siècle - musée des Arts décoratifs, Paris
- 1975 - L'Orientalisme en question 1825-1875 - De Missolonghi à Suez ou l'Orientalisme de Delacroix à Flaubert - musée Cantini - France, Marseille
- 1984 - The Orientalists: Delacroix to Matisse - European painters in North Africa and the Near East - Royal Academy of Arts, London
- 1996 - La modernité - Collections du musée d'Orsay - Metropolitan Art Museum, Tokyo
- 1996 - La modernité - Collections du musée d'Orsay - City museum, Kobe
- 2006 - La caravanne du Caire. L'Egypte sur d'autres rives - salle Saint-Georges - Belgique, Liège, 2006, oeuvre prêtée mais non reproduite dans le catalogue
- 2015 - El canto del cisne. Pinturas académicas del Salón de Paris. Colecciones Musée d'Orsay - Fundación Mapfre, Madrid
- 2018 - L’Algérie de Gustave Guillaumet (1840-1887) - musée des Beaux-Arts, La Rochelle
- 2018-19 - L’Algérie de Gustave Guillaumet (1840-1887) - musée des Beaux-Arts, Limoges
- 2019 - L’Algérie de Gustave Guillaumet (1840-1887) - musée d'Art et d'Industrie André Diligent - La Piscine, Roubaix
- 2023 - Near East to Far West. Fantasies of French and American Colonialism - Denver Art Museum
- 2025 - 100 oeuvres qui racontent le climat - Cognac - musée - Cognac

== Critical reception ==
At the time, the desert was symbolic of a world outside the reach of civilization and its progress - or at least in the eyes of colonial Europeans. The harshness of the landscape, the feeling of solitude and desolation are heightened by the division of the painting into wide horizontal bands, the monotony broken only by the presence of men and animals in the distance. From the skeleton in the foreground, the eye moves towards the glow surrounding the caravan that appears like a mirage on the horizon. Despite the pitiless harshness of the scene, the viewer is drawn into an intensely personal and intimate encounter with this territory. Guillaumet’s dramatic use of light and the minimal use of colour has been compared to the work of J. M. W. Turner.

“Never has the infinite nature of the desert been painted in a simpler, more grandiose and more moving way,” commented Théophile Gautier. Not all critics were so favourable. Paul Pierre considered it a painting without a proper subject, with no reason to exist. Jules-Antoine Castagnary described it as a “fantasy Sahara,” while Paul de Saint-Victor described it as “painted nothingness.

La Revue de l'Afrique française said that while the work did not rise to the level of a masterpiece, it was nevertheless a canvas of great worth, and certainly much superior to the mediocre works Guillaumet had produced in recent years. The immense size of the violet plain, with the mysterious effects of light playing on the horizon, give rise to the most poignant impression of complete solitude from which there is no respite.
