= Portrait of Emile Zola =

Painting by Édouard Manet

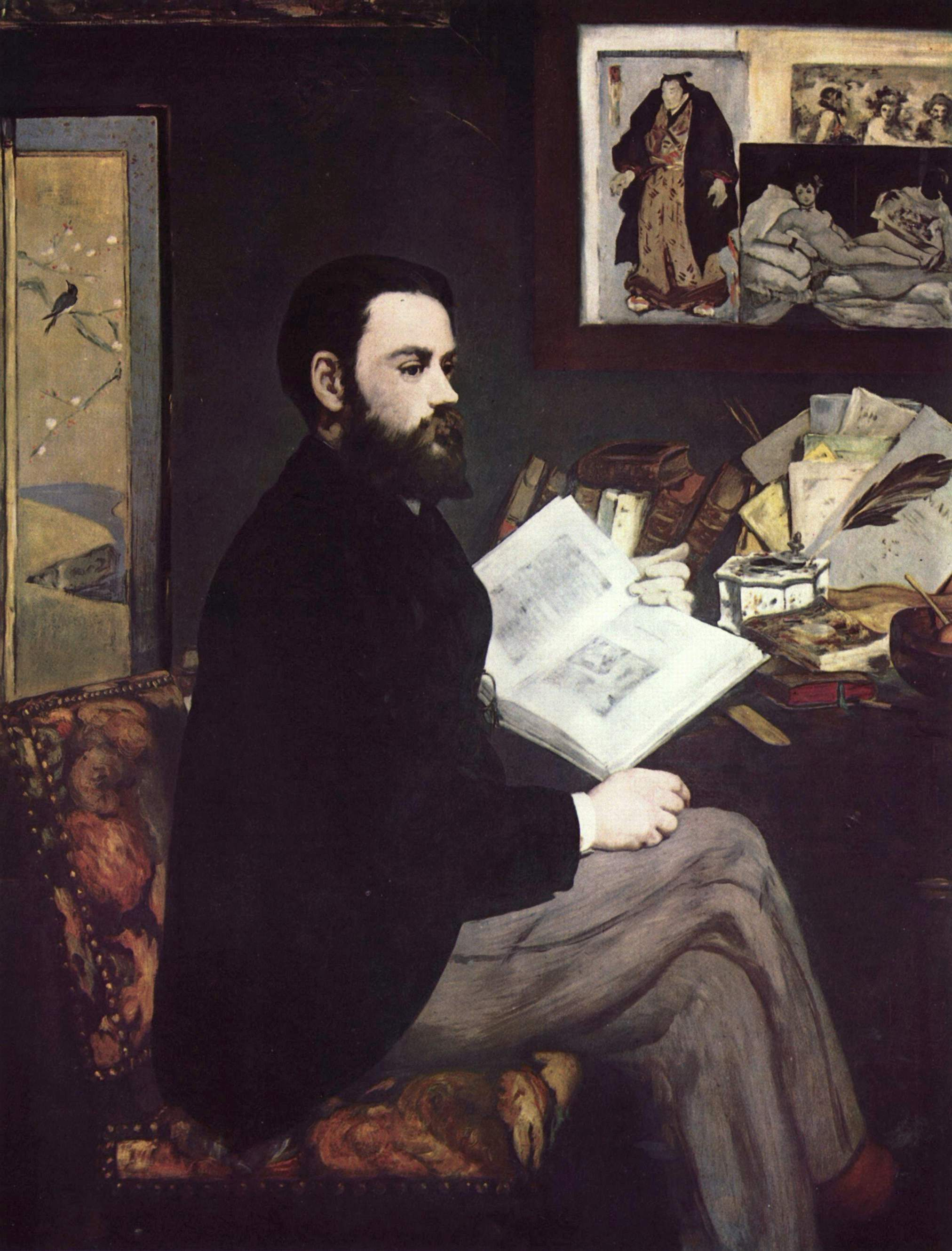
- Medium: Oil on canvas
- Dimensions: 146.5 cm × 114 cm (57.7 in × 45 in)
- Location: Musée d'Orsay, Paris

Portrait of Émile Zola is a painting of Émile Zola by Édouard Manet. Manet submitted the portrait to the Salon of 1868 in Paris.

At this time Zola was known for his art criticism, and perhaps particularly as the writer of the novel Thérèse Raquin. This told the story of an adulterous affair between Thérèse, the wife of a clerk in a railway company, and a would-be painter named Laurent, whose work, rather like that of Zola's friend Paul Cézanne, is denigrated by the critics. In the eleventh chapter the milieu of Manet's Le Déjeuner sur l’herbe is evoked, in the murder scene, where Camille, the husband, goes out for the day with his wife and her lover to Saint-Ouen.

On the wall is a reproduction of Manet's Olympia, a controversial painting at the 1865 Salon but which Zola considered Manet's best work. "Behind it is an engraving from Velazquez's Bacchus indicating the taste for Spanish art shared by the painter and the writer. A Japanese print of a wrestler by Utagawa Kuniaki II completes the décor." A Japanese screen on the left of the picture recalls the role that the Far East played in revolutionizing ideas on perspective and colour in European painting.

== See also ==
- List of paintings by Édouard Manet
