= Evening Prayer in the Sahara =

Painting by Gustave Guillaumet

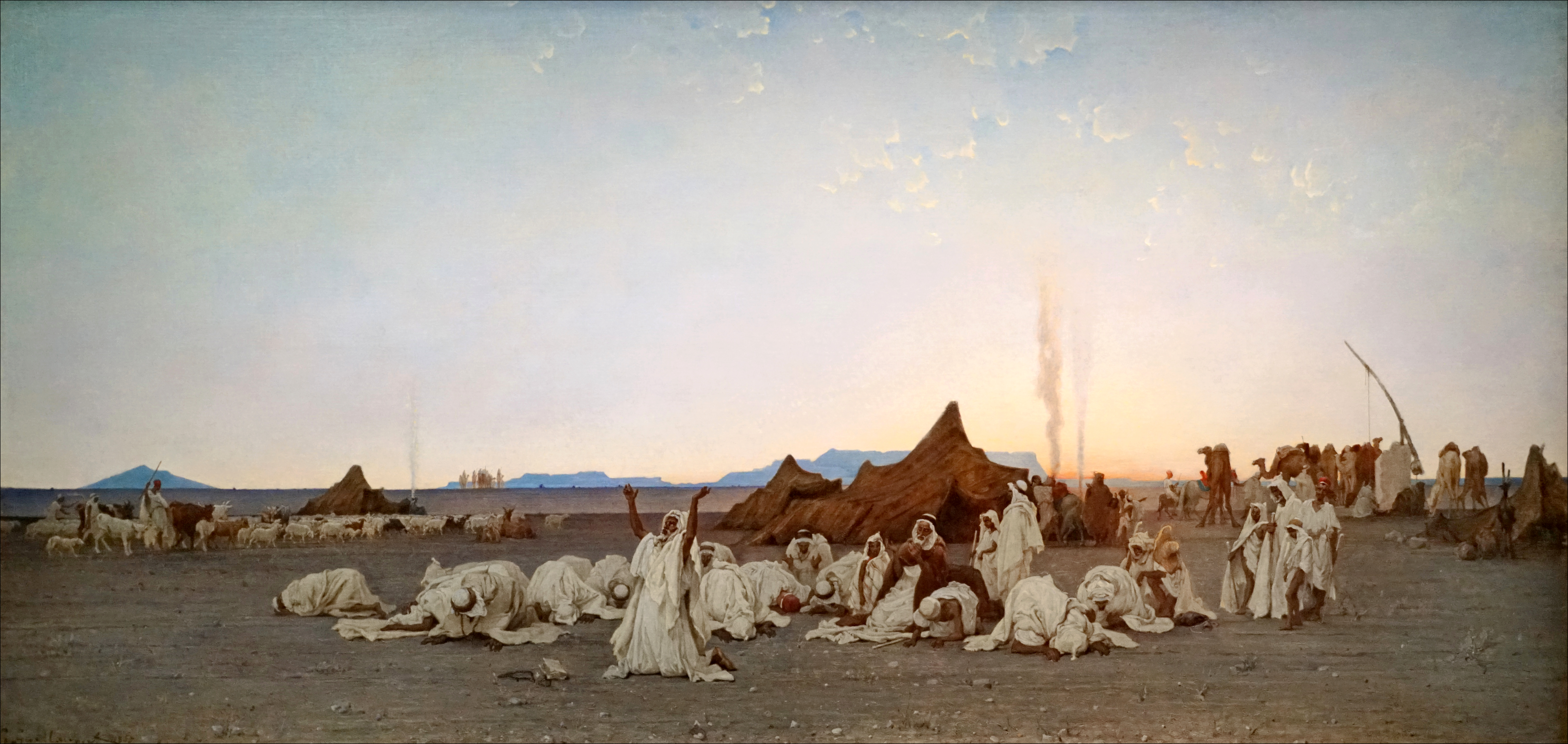
Evening Prayer in the Sahara (1863) by Gustave Guillaumet

Evening Prayer in the Sahara (French: Prière du soir dans le Sahara) is an 1863 painting by Gustave Guillaumet. Executed in oil on canvas and measuring 1.37m by 3.005m, it is one of the most celebrated desert paintings in the Musée d’Orsay. The painting is typical of Guillaumet’s earlier work, combining classical composition with a vast landscape populated by exotic figures, making it a standard orientalist genre scene.

== Description ==
The work depicts a group of Muslims in the Algerian desert in various stages of prostration during the Maghrib prayer as behind them smoke rises from campfires. The scene is set on a wide plain that stretches to the horizon, which is broken only by a few mountainous forms. The sun has already set, the light is fading and fine plumes of smoke indicate that the air is calm and still.

There are various inaccuracies in the scene represented in the painting, most notably in the pose of the central figure, which is unknown in Islamic prayer. Also, the complete absence of any women from the scene implies the desert is a masculine space.

== History ==
Guillaumet was fascinated by Algeria, visiting it nine times after his initial stay in 1862. During the period of his visits the conquest of the territory - particularly the Sahara - was still underway. Napoleon III visited the territory in 1860, and described himself as “just as much the Emperor of the Arabs as Emperor of the French”. The Emperor imagined a grand project: an Arab kingdom, which would stretch from Algiers to Baghdad, under the protection of France.

Guillaumet completed the work in Algeria and brought it back to France where it was exhibited in the Salon of 1863 and won a salon medal as well as being purchased by the state.

The painting has been in the permanent collection of the Musée du Luxembourg (1865-88), the Louvre (1888-91), the Museum of Fine Arts of Lyon (1891-1982) and the Musée d’Orsay (since 1982). It was also exhibited at the Exposition Universelle (1867); at an exhibition dedicated to the works of Guillaumet at the École nationale supérieure des Beaux-Arts (1888); the Exposition Universelle (1900); the Galeries nationales du Grand Palais (1974); L'Algérie de Delacroix à Renoir at the Institut du monde arabe (2003-2004); and L’Algérie de Gustave Guillaumet (1840-1887) at La Piscine Museum in Roubaix (2019).

== Interpretation ==
Guillaumet was a naturalist painter, interested in light and atmosphere. Unlike some other artists he was not primarily interested in the bright costumes or more conventional orientalist themes, but in the vastness of the infinite horizon and the majesty of the desert. As was common in his works the landscape is stripped down to bare essentials, denying the viewer any sense of perspective or alternative focus to the figures in the foreground. Instead, he focuses on the quality of light in the scene, and the atmosphere it evokes.

His work was a pivotal point in orientalist art, produced at a time of great interest in Algeria. Like some of his other Algerian works (such as Razzia in Jebel Nador and Famine), Evening Prayer in the Sahara is melodramatic in tone though it also conformed to the classical composition and clean finish expected of works favoured by the Académie des Beaux-Arts.

The desert was a symbolic construct in European art, a place outside of time or civilization, its infertility implying the need for European intervention to make it fruitful. Guillaumet himself has been described as “a realist, domesticating the exotic”. The monotony of the wilderness he depicts suggests that there is nothing for the human spirit in this space but religious delirium.

Guillaumet himself deplored “the disappearance of the strange, mysterious and evocative culture of Algiers as the price of a modern progress that bring the vandalism of the market economy and the perversion of morals.” In this context his painting may be seen as a counterpoint to the decadence of that modern progress. In his writings he described the evening prayer in the desert as a source of consolation and an expression of hope for those constantly subjected to harsh living conditions.

Reviewing the painting when it was exhibited at the salon of 1863, Auguste Cordier commented on the sharpness and depth of its colours, as well as on the authenticity and sobriety of the whole scene, most particularly in the figures of the praying Arabs. Its strong and simple beauty, he felt, was reinforced by the various noble attitudes of the men at prayer.

In contrast, reviewing the same exhibition, Philip Gilbert Hamerton commented “this is the oddest, queerest, most eccentric, least academic thing in the exhibition… it does the jury great credit to have admitted this picture, for it is precisely of the order which juries do often refuse.” He also described the Arabs portrayed in the painting as “not graceful, but strangely wild and pathetic.”
