= Alfred Darjou =

French painter

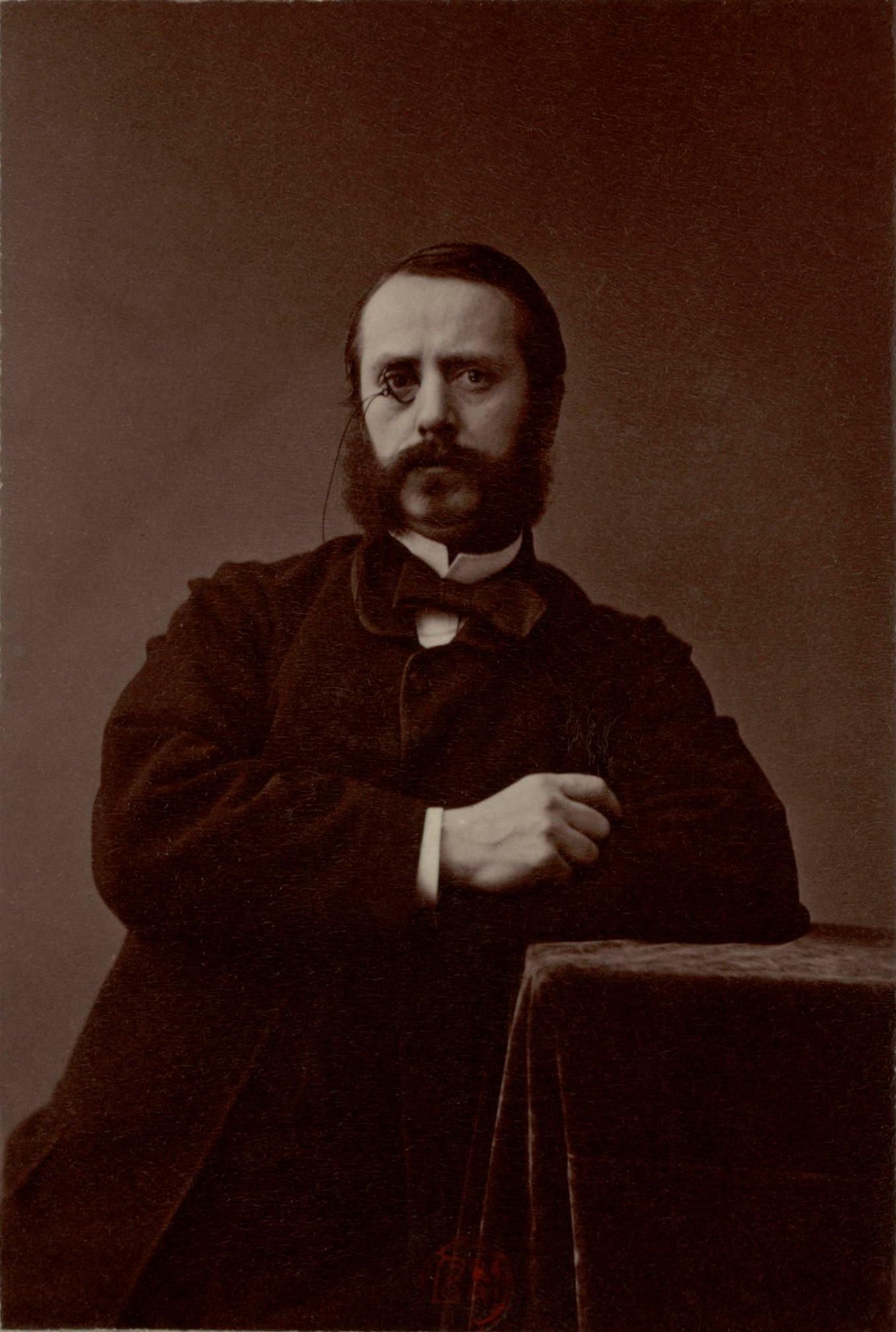
Alfred-Henri Darjou, by Nadar

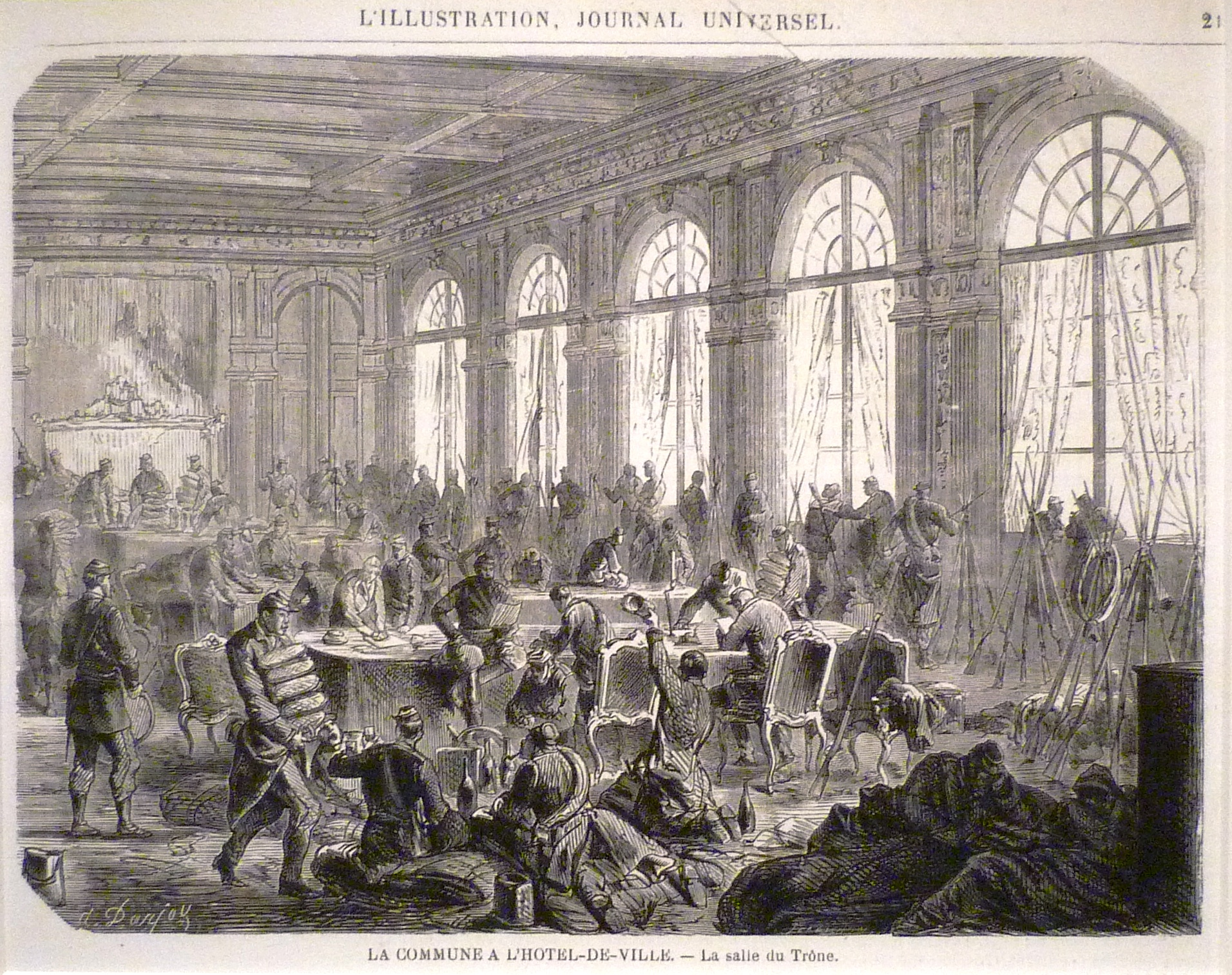
The Paris Commune at the Hôtel de Ville, from L'Illustration of 15 April 1871

Henri-Alfred Darjou (1832–1874) was a French painter and draughtsman. He was born in Paris. His father, Victor Darjou, was a portrait painter of some ability. Darjou studied under his father and under Léon Cogniet, and exhibited first at the Salon of 1853, from which time onwards he almost every year sent pictures which were for the most part of genre subjects. The paintings of Darjou have, however, done less for his reputation than the numerous designs which he made for the Illustration and the Monde illustré. He was also the designer of the front cover of the 1867 book Les Reves et les Moyens de les Diriger: Observations Pratiques by Marquis d'Hervey de Saint-Denys. He died in Paris in 1874.
