= 1929 in art =

Events from the year 1929 in art.

== Events ==
- January 6 – On the death of New York collector Louisine Havemeyer, her collection of paintings, rich in works of Impressionism, is bequeathed to the Metropolitan Museum of Art.
- January 10 – First appearance of Hergé's Belgian comic book hero Tintin as Tintin in the Land of the Soviets (Les Aventures de Tintin, reporter..., au pays des Soviets), begins serialization in children's newspaper supplement Le Petit Vingtième.
- January 17 – First appearance of E. C. Segar's American sailor comic book hero Popeye in Thimble Theatre.
- April 30 – English painters Stephen Bone and Mary Adshead marry.
- May 6 – The Royal Academy Exhibition of 1929 opens at Burlington House in London
- June 6 – Première of the Surrealist film Un Chien Andalou by Luis Buñuel and Salvador Dalí, in Paris.
- July 5 – In London, Scotland Yard seizes 13 paintings of male and female nudes by D. H. Lawrence from a Mayfair gallery on grounds of indecency under the Vagrancy Act 1838.
- August 21 – Mexican painters Diego Rivera and Frieda Kahlo marry for the first time, in a civil ceremony in the town hall at Coyoacán.
- October
  - La galerie Goemans opens in Paris with a Surrealist exhibition featuring Jean Arp, Salvador Dalí, Yves Tanguy and René Magritte.
  - American artist Lynd Ward publishes his first wordless "novel in woodcuts", Gods' Man, in New York City.
- October 12 – Joan Miró marries Pilar Juncosa in Palma, Mallorca.
- October 27 – Socialite Bryan Guinness and his new wife Diana present an exhibition at their London home of paintings by supposed German-born artist Bruno Hat. They are in fact by Brian Howard and Hat is portrayed by Tom Mitford.
- November – The East London Group (for the first time under this name) exhibit with Walter Sickert at the Lefevre Gallery in the West End of London.
- November 7 – The Museum of Modern Art opens in New York City. An exhibit, "Cézanne, Gauguin, Seurat and van Gogh", at the new museum attracts 47,000 visitors.
- December 1 – Underground Electric Railways Company of London officially opens its new headquarters building at 55 Broadway designed by Charles Holden, incorporating sculptures by Jacob Epstein, Eric Gill and Henry Moore.
- Aeropittura ("aeropainting") is launched in a manifesto, Perspectives of Flight, signed by Benedetta Cappa, Fortunato Depero, Gerardo Dottori, Fillìa, Filippo Tommaso Marinetti, Enrico Prampolini, Mino Somenzi and Guglielmo Sansoni (Tato) in Italy.
- Cercle et Carré group of abstract artists founded in Paris by Joaquín Torres García and Michel Seuphor.
- The Barcelona chair is designed by Ludwig Mies van der Rohe.
- Henri Matisse makes more than 300 (chine-collé) etchings and lithographs, chiefly of Lisette Löwengard.
- Musashino Art University originates as the Teikoku Bijutsu Gakkō ("Imperial Art School") in Tokyo.
- Curtis Moffat opens a gallery at 4 Fitzroy Square in London.
- Karl Blossfeldt publishes a collection of close-up photographs of plants and living things as Urformen der Kunst: Photographische Pflanzenbilder in Berlin.

== Awards ==
- Archibald Prize: John Longstaff – W A Holman, KC
- Laura Knight made a Dame Commander of the Order of the British Empire

== Works ==
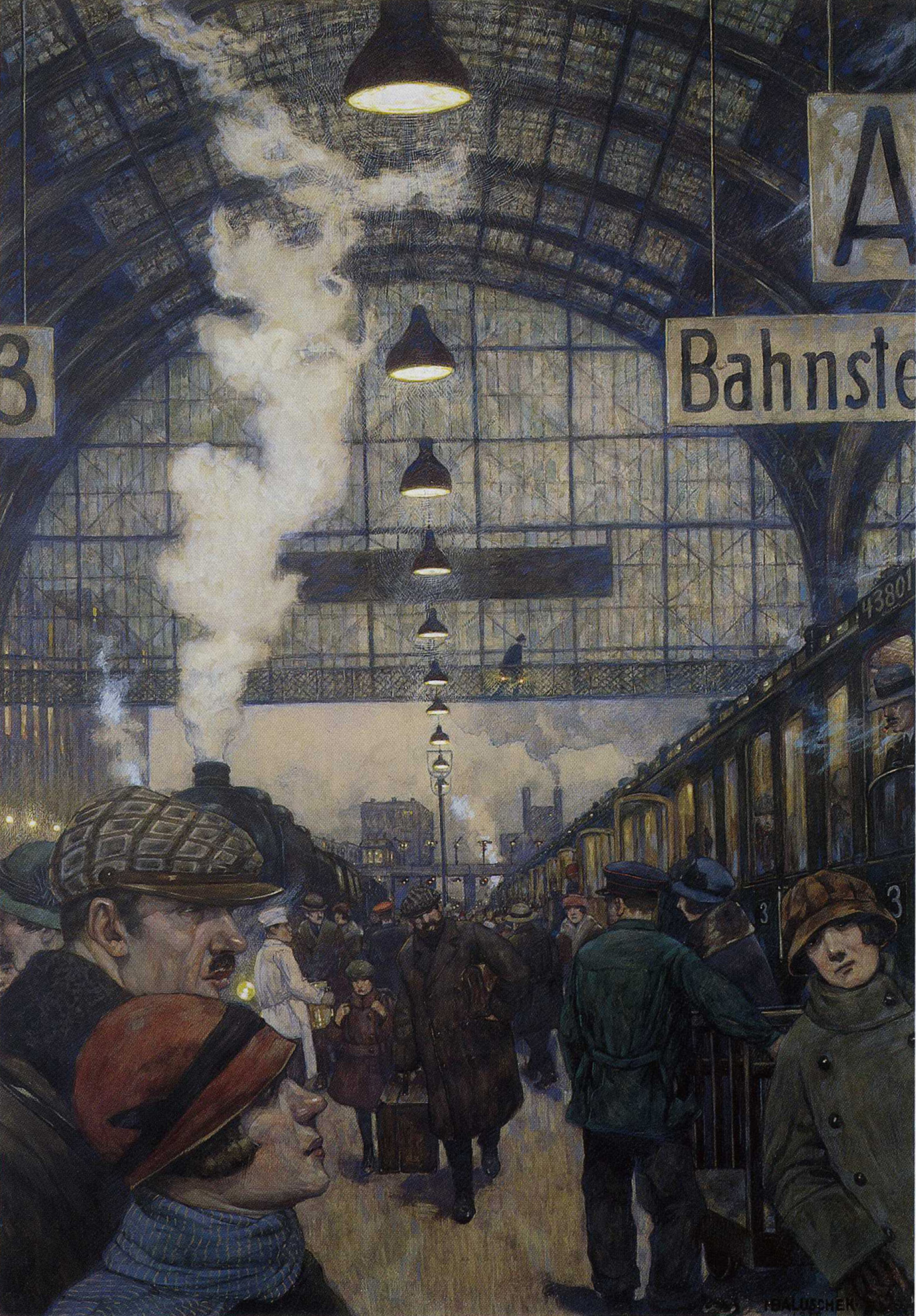
Lehrter Bahnhof by Hans Baluschek

- David Bomberg – Toledo from the Alcazar
- Emily Carr – The Indian Church
- Salvador Dalí
  - The Accommodations of Desire
  - The First Days of Spring
  - The Great Masturbator
  - The Lugubrious Game
- Guan Zilan – Portrait of Miss L
- Edward Hopper – Chop Suey
- Frieda Kahlo – The Bus
- Wassily Kandinsky – Upward
- Kawamura Kiyoo – Founding of the Nation (建国, Kenkoku, Le coq blanc)
- Paul Klee – Highway and Byways
- Harue Koga - The Sea
- John Lavery
  - The Chess Players
  - The Opening of the Modern Foreign and Sargent Galleries at the Tate Gallery
- Tamara de Lempicka
  - Autoportrait (Tamara in a Green Bugatti)
  - The Musician
- René Magritte
  - The False Mirror
  - On the Threshold of Liberty (first version)
  - The Treachery of Images
- Jeanne Mammen – Boring Dolls (watercolor)
- Carl Milles – The Sun Singer (bronze)
- Henry Moore – Reclining Figure (sculpture, Leeds Art Gallery)
- George Pitt Morison – The Foundation of Perth 1829
- Georgia O'Keeffe – The Lawrence Tree
- Francis Picabia – Hera
- Pablo Picasso
  - Nude in an Armchair (Musée Picasso, Paris)
  - Woman in a Red Armchair
- Louis Frederick Roslyn – Bronze reliefs on Rawtenstall Cenotaph (England)
- Stanley Spencer – The Resurrection of the Soldiers (Sandham Memorial Chapel)
- Helen Torr – Houses on a Barge
- Julio Romero de Torres – La Fuensanta
- Grant Wood – Woman with Plants
- Doris Zinkeisen – Mrs Grahame Johnstone (self-portrait)

== Births ==
=== January to June ===
- 2 January – Anton Lehmden, Slovak-born Austrian painter, co-founder of the Vienna School of Fantastic Realism (d. 2018)
- 8 January – Poul Kjærholm, Danish designer (d. 1980)
- 13 January – Roy Oxlade, English painter and critic (d. 2014)
- 26 January – Jules Feiffer, American cartoonist
- 28 January – Claes Oldenburg, Swedish-born American sculptor (d. 2022)
- 9 February – Clement Meadmore, Australian-born American sculptor (d. 2005)
- 24 February – Zdzisław Beksiński, Polish painter, photographer and fantasy artist (k. 2005)
- 4 March – Wolfgang Hollegha, Austrian painter
- 22 March – Yayoi Kusama, Japanese visual artist (d. 2026)
- 31 March
  - Liz Claiborne, Belgian-born American fashion designer and entrepreneur (d. 2007)
  - Jay DeFeo, American visual artist (d. 1989)
- 5 April – Hugo Claus, Belgian novelist, poet, playwright, painter and film director (d. 2008)
- 7 April – Gabriel Caruana, Maltese artist (d. 2018)
- 23 May – Vladimír Preclík, Czech writer and sculptor (d. 2008)
- 31 May – Nicholas Krushenick, American pop art painter (d. 1999)
- 4 June – Davidee Itulu, Inuk artist (d. 2006)
- 26 June – Milton Glaser, American graphic designer and illustrator (d. 2020)

=== July to December ===
- 13 July – René Laloux, French animator and film director (d. 2004)
- 25 July – Bryan Pearce, English naïve painter (d. 2007)
- 29 July – Jean Baudrillard, French cultural theorist, sociologist, philosopher, political commentator and photographer (d. 2007)
- 8 August – Josef Mikl, Austrian abstract painter (d. 2008)
- 4 September – Anne Dunn, English painter
- 21 September – Edgar Valter, Estonian writer and illustrator of children's books (d. 2006)
- 4 November — Jane Davis Doggett, American graphic artist (d. 2023)

=== Undated ===
- Barrie Cook, English abstract painter (d. 2020)
- Li Yuan-chia, Chinese-born artist, poet and curator (d. 1994)

== Deaths ==
- January 6 - Louisine Havemeyer, American art collector and philanthropist (b 1855)
- January 12 – Arthur Diehl, English landscape painter (b. 1870)
- January 13 – Emil Fuchs, Austrian American sculptor and painter (b. 1866)
- January 18 – Maurice Bouchor, French poet and sculptor (b. 1855)
- February 14 – Sydney Carline, English painter, war artist (b. 1888)
- February 22 – Louise Upton Brumback, American landscape painter (b. 1867)
- March 1
  - Vincenzo Gemito, Italian sculptor (b. 1852)
  - Ernst Oppler, German painter (b. 1867)
- March 5 – Francesco Paolo Michetti, Italian painter (b. 1851)
- April 22 – Henry Lerolle, painter and arts patron (b. 1848)
- May 5 – Charles Grafly, sculptor (b. 1862)
- May 9 – Kate Dickens Perugini, English painter (b. 1839)
- June 13 – Margaret Forrest, art collector (b. 1844)
- July 3 – Pascal Dagnan-Bouveret, painter (b. 1852)
- July 12 – Robert Henri, painter, leader of the Ash Can School (b. 1865)
- July 28 – Allen Hutchinson, sculptor (b. 1855)
- August 9 – Heinrich Zille, photographer and illustrator (b. 1858)
- October 1 – Antoine Bourdelle, sculptor (b. 1861)
- October 26 – Aby Warburg, German art historian (b. 1866)
- date unknown - Adelaïde Alsop Robineau, American painter and potter (b. 1865)

== See also ==
- 1929 in fine arts of the Soviet Union
