= Goseda Yoshimatsu =

Japanese painter

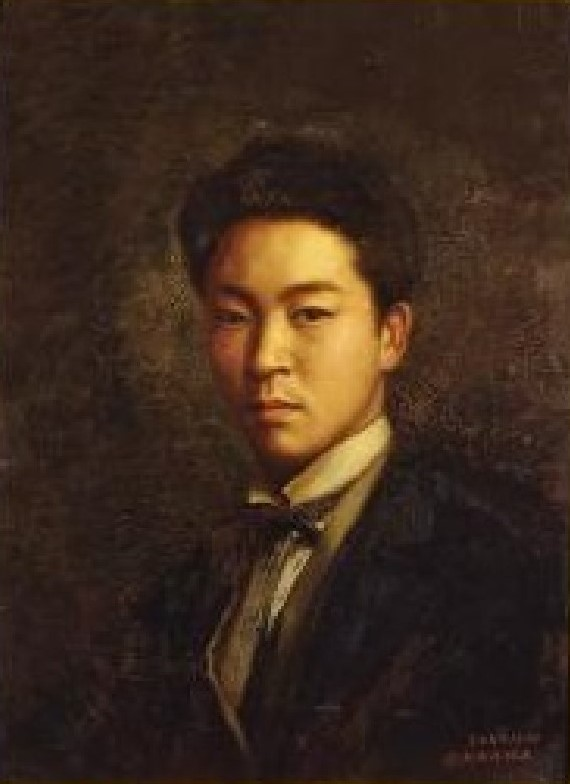
Self-portrait (1877)

Goseda Yoshimatsu (五姓田義松; June 12, 1855 – September 4, 1915) was a Japanese painter mainly active in the Meiji era.

== Biography ==
In 1855, he was born in Edo, as a second son of Goseda Hōriū who was a Yōga painter. In 1865, he became Charles Wirgman's pupil. In 1874, he was employed at Imperial Japanese Army Academy as a picture teacher by recommendation of Kawakami Tōgai. In 1876, he entered Engineering Technology Art School and became Antonio Fontanesi's pupil. In 1877, he left the school and won the Hōmon Prize (鳳紋賞) in Yōga section of the first domestic industrial exposition with Abekawa Fuji Zu (阿部川富士図). From 1878, he accompanied an Imperial tour to Hokuriku and Tokai as an attendant painter of Emperor Meiji.

In 1880, he went to France and became Léon Bonnat's pupil. In 1882, his work was accepted for the Salon, a famous exhibition. He is the first Japanese painter who was accepted for the Salon. In 1889, he returned to Japan via the United States of America and participated in the establishment of the Meiji Art Society. He participated in the First Sino-Japanese War. In 1915, he died in his own home in Yokohama.

== Noted works ==
Name	Japanese name	Type	Number of paints	Owner	drawn in	Note
self-portrait	自画像	oil on canvas	1	The University Art Museum, Tokyo University of the Arts (ja)	1877	
Imperial tour to Hokuriku and Tokai in 1878	明治十一年北陸東海御巡幸図	oil on board	41	Gyobutsu	1878	
portrait of Goseda Hōriū	五姓田芳柳像	oil on canvas	1	The University Art Museum, Tokyo University of the Arts	1880	
Dress of a doll	人形の着物	oil	1	Kasama Nichido Museum of Art	1883	
Port (Yokohama landscope)	港（横浜風景）	oil on canvas	1	Museum of Modern Art, Kamakura & Hayama	around 1891	

== See also ==
- Takahashi Yuichi – Charles Wirgman's pupil
- Goseda Hōriū II – Goseda Yoshimatsu's pupil and husband of Goseda Hōriū's daughter
