= Kiyoo =

- Gender: Male

Origin
- Origin: Japanese
- Meaning: Different meanings depending on the kanji used

Kiyoo (written: 清雄, 清夫 or 潔雄) is a masculine Japanese given name. Notable people with the name include:

- Kiyoo Kanda (神田 清雄; died 1970), Japanese footballer
- Kawamura Kiyoo (川村 清雄; 1852–1934), Japanese yōga artist
- Kiyoo Mogi (茂木 清夫; born 1929), Japanese seismologist
- Kiyoo Wadati (和達 清夫; 1902–1995), Japanese seismologist
- Kiyoo Yui (油井 潔雄; born 1943), Japanese hurdler
