= Wyatt Eaton =

Canadian-American painter

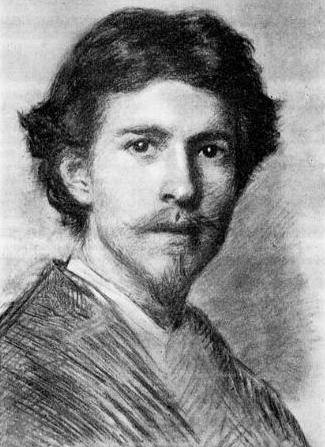
- Self portrait of Wyatt Eaton
- Born: Charles Wyatt Eaton; May 6, 1849; Philipsburg, Canada East
- Died: June 7, 1896 (aged 47); Newport, Rhode Island, United States
- Education: National Academy of Design, New York City
- Known for: Painter

Wyatt Eaton, baptised Charles Wyatt Eaton, (May 6, 1849 – June 7, 1896) was a Canadian-American portrait and figure painter, remembered as one of the founders of the Society of American Artists.

== Biography ==
Born in Philipsburg, Quebec, Lower Canada, Eaton was a student of the National Academy of Design, New York, studying with Samuel Colman, Daniel Huntington and others. In 1872, he moved to Paris and studied at the École des Beaux-Arts under Jean-Léon Gérôme. During this time, he made the acquaintance of Jean-François Millet at Barbizon, and was also influenced by his friend Jules Bastien-Lepage to believe that his art should focus on rural life.

After his return to the United States in 1876, he painted a series of portraits of American poets for the Century magazine which were engraved by Timothy Cole (Eaton`s portrait of him is in the collection of the Art Gallery of Ontario). He became a teacher in the Cooper Institute, and opened a studio in New York City but returned to Montreal often to paint portraits. In 1880, he travelled to France and Italy. He became one of the founders of the American Art Association, later the Society of American Artists, of which he was the first secretary. He was also a founding member of the Society of Canadian Artists in Montreal (1867). Eaton died from tuberculosis at Newport, Rhode Island on June 7, 1896.

== Works ==
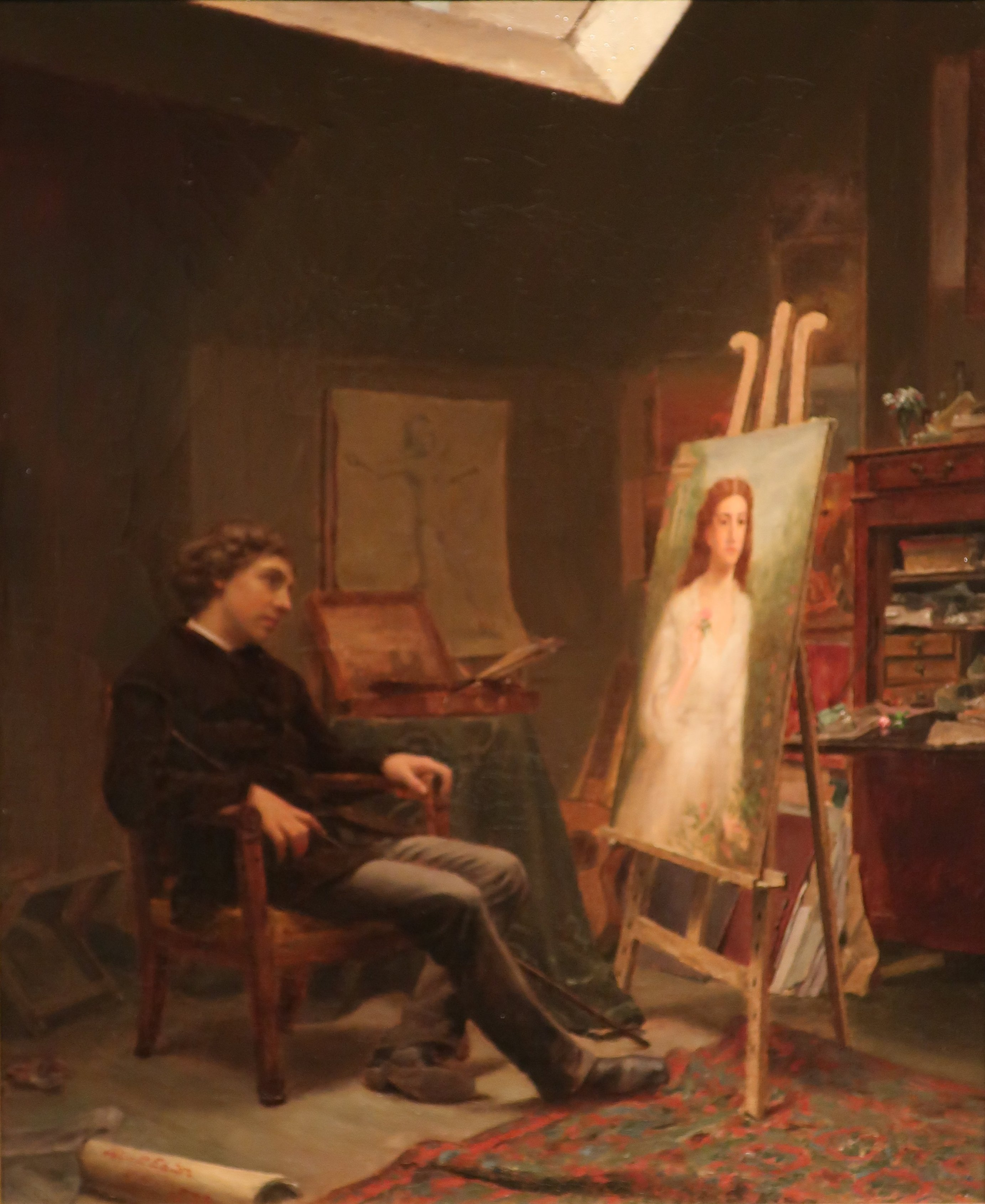
The Artist in His Studio (1873), the National Academy of Design

- 1868 - Study of a Classical Bust, oil on canvas, National Gallery of Canada
- 1869 - Study after the Antique, c. 1869, oil on paper, National Gallery of Canada
- 1870 - Ann Letta Stanton Baker, oil on canvas, National Gallery of Canada
- 1870 - Arthur Henry Gilmour, oil on canvas, National Gallery of Canada
- 1870 - Farmer's Boy
- 1870 - John Baker, oil on canvas, National Gallery of Canada
- 1870 - John Carpenter Baker, oil on canvas, National Gallery of Canada
- 1870 - Mary Jane Baker Gilmour, oil on canvas, National Gallery of Canada
- 1870 - Lillian Krans, oil on canvas, Robert McLaughlin Gallery, Oshawa
- 1870 - Hiram Krans, oil on canvas, Robert McLaughlin Gallery, Oshawa
- 1873 - Landscape Sketch, oil on canvas, mounted on cardboard –National Gallery of Canada
- 1873 - Monsieur Coclèze, c. 1873, National Gallery of Canada
- 1873 - Portrait of a Man, National Gallery of Canada
- 1875 - Reverie, view
- 1876 - Harvesters at Rest
- 1877 - Haystacks at Barbizon, etching in brown on cream laid paper, National Gallery of Canada
- 1877 - Laure, etching on cream wove paper,National Gallery of Canada
- 1877 - Trees in the Forest of Fontainebleau, etching in brown on cream laid paper,National Gallery of Canada
- 1879 - Boy Whittling
- 1879 - Portrait of William Cullen Bryant, oil on canvas, Brooklyn Museum
- 1880 - Grandmother and Child
- 1881 - Portrait of a Lady (Mrs. W.W. Ladd Jr.?), charcoal on buff laid paper, National Gallery of Canada
- 1884 - The Shepherdess, oil on canvas, Owens Art Gallery, Mount Allison University
- 1884 - The Gleaner, pastel on buff laid paper, National Gallery of Canada
- 1885 - Timothy Cole, oil on canvas,
- 1888 - Ariadne, oil on canvas, Smithsonian American Art Museum
- 1889 - William T. Evans, oil on canvas, Smithsonian American Art Museum
- 1894 - Sir William Van Horne, oil on canvas, National Gallery of Canada
- Lassitude, view

== Portraits of Wyatt Eaton ==
- Portrait of Wyatt Eaton, c. 1878, J. Alden Weir, oil on canvas Smithsonian American Art Museum
- Self-portrait, 1879 Canadian gallery of Art
