= 1870 in art =

Events from the year 1870 in art.

== Events ==
- 2 May – The Royal Academy Exhibition of 1870 opens at Burlington House in London
- June 28 – Claude Monet marries his mistress and model Camille Doncieux in Paris; Gustave Courbet is a witness.
- July – Franco-Prussian War breaks out: Monet, Pissarro, Daubigny and the dealer Paul Durand-Ruel flee to London; Cézanne and his mistress, Marie-Hortense Fiquet, leave Paris for L'Estaque (on the French Riviera) where he predominantly paints landscapes. In August, Frédéric Bazille joins a Zouave regiment. In September the Dutch painter Lourens Alma Tadema moves permanently to London where he adopts the name Lawrence Alma-Tadema.
- Édouard Manet and Louis Edmond Duranty fight a duel at Café Guerbois, Paris.
- Russian industrialist and patron of the arts Savva Mamontov acquires the Abramtsevo Colony and hosts a group of traditionalist artists there.
- Dante Gabriel Rossetti's Poems are published, exhumed from Elizabeth Siddal's grave.
- Daoud Corm goes to Rome to study under Roberto Bompiani at the Accademia di San Luca.

== Paintings ==
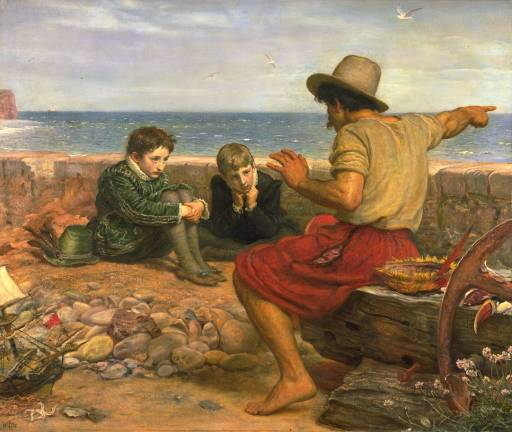
Millais – The Boyhood of Raleigh

- Wilhelm Amberg – Reading from Goethe's Werther (Vorlesung aus Goethes Werther)
- Frédéric Bazille
  - Countryside near Lex
  - Studio in the rue Condamine
  - La Toilette
- Cathy Madox Brown – Ford Madox Brown at his Easel
- Ford Madox Brown – Romeo and Juliet
- Edward Burne-Jones – Phyllis and Demophoon
- Paul Cézanne – Paul Alexis reading a manuscript to Émile Zola (1869–70; São Paulo Museum of Art)
- Edgar Degas
  - The Dancing Class (c.)
  - The Orchestra at the Opera (c.)
- Jean-Jules-Antoine Lecomte du Nouÿ – Demosthenes Practicing Oratory (Démosthène s'exerçant à la parole)
- Henri Fantin-Latour – A Studio in the Batignolles (Musée d'Orsay, Paris)
- Anselm Feuerbach – The Judgement of Paris (c. 1869–70)
- Mariano Fortuny – The Spanish Wedding (Museu Nacional d'Art de Catalunya)
- Jean-Léon Gérôme – Moorish Bath
- Arthur Hughes – You Cannot Barre Love Oute
- Christian Inger - Smith Rescued by Pocahontas
- Jean-Paul Laurens – Pope Formosus and Stephen VI (Le Pape Formose et Étienne VII)
- Édouard Manet
  - La Brioche (Metropolitan Museum of Art, New York)
  - Effect of Snow on Petit-Montrouge (National Museum Cardiff)
- John Everett Millais
  - The Boyhood of Raleigh (Tate Britain, London)
  - The Knight Errant
- Pierre-Auguste Renoir
  - ‘’Bather with a Griffon Dog’’
  - Madame Clémentine Valensi Stora (L'Algérienne)
  - ‘’Odalisque’’
  - La Promenade
- Dante Gabriel Rossetti
  - Beata Beatrix (approximate completion date)
  - Sibylla Palmifera
- Dmitri Sinodi-Popov – An Old Greek
- James Tissot
  - Portrait of Frederick Burnaby
  - La Partie carrée
- Raja Ravi Varma – Shakuntala

== Sculpture ==
- Statue of Abraham Lincoln (New York City)

== Awards ==
- Grand Prix de Rome, painting:
- Grand Prix de Rome, sculpture:
- Grand Prix de Rome, architecture: Albert-Félix-Théophile Thomas.
- Grand Prix de Rome, music: Charles Edouard Lefebvre & Henri Maréchal

== Births ==
- January 1 – Louis Vauxcelles, French Jewish art critic (died 1943)
- January 11 – Alexander Stirling Calder, American sculptor (died 1945)
- February 5 – C. E. Brock, English painter and illustrator (died 1938)
- March 13 – William Glackens, American painter (died 1938)
- June 22 – Antonio Dattilo Rubbo, Italian-born painter and art teacher (died 1955)
- July 21 – Emil Orlík, Czech-born painter and lithographer (died 1932)
- July 25 – Maxfield Parrish, American painter and illustrator (died 1966)
- November 4 – Basil Temple Blackwood, British book illustrator (died 1917)
- November 18 – Franz Metzner, German sculptor (died 1919)
- November 25 – Maurice Denis, French painter and decorative artist (died 1943)
- December 23 – John Marin, American painter (died 1953)
- date unknown – Arthur Diehl, English-born landscape painter (died 1929)

== Deaths ==
- January 17 – Alexander Anderson, American illustrator (born 1775)
- January 27 – Johannes Flintoe, Danish-Norwegian painter of Norwegian landscapes (born 1787)
- February 21 – Robert Jefferson Bingham, English-born photographer (born 1824 or 1825)
- March 19 – William Egley, English miniature painter (born 1798)
- April 25 – Daniel Maclise, Irish-born painter (born 1806)
- May 17 – David Octavius Hill, Scottish painter and pioneer photographer (born 1802)
- July 13 – Christian Albrecht Jensen, Danish painter (born 1792)
- August 25 – Richard Seymour-Conway, 4th Marquess of Hertford, English francophile art collector (born 1800)
- November 7 – Cornelia Aletta van Hulst, Dutch painter (born 1797)
- November 28 – Frédéric Bazille, French Impressionist painter (born 1841) (killed in action)
- December 9
  - Max Emanuel Ainmiller, German glass painter (born 1807)
  - Patrick MacDowell, Irish sculptor from Belfast (born 1799)
- December 12 – Martin Cregan, Irish portrait painter (born 1788)
- Undated – Achille Leonardi, Italian genre painter (born 1800)
