= Charles Wirgman =

English artist and cartoonist (1832–1891)

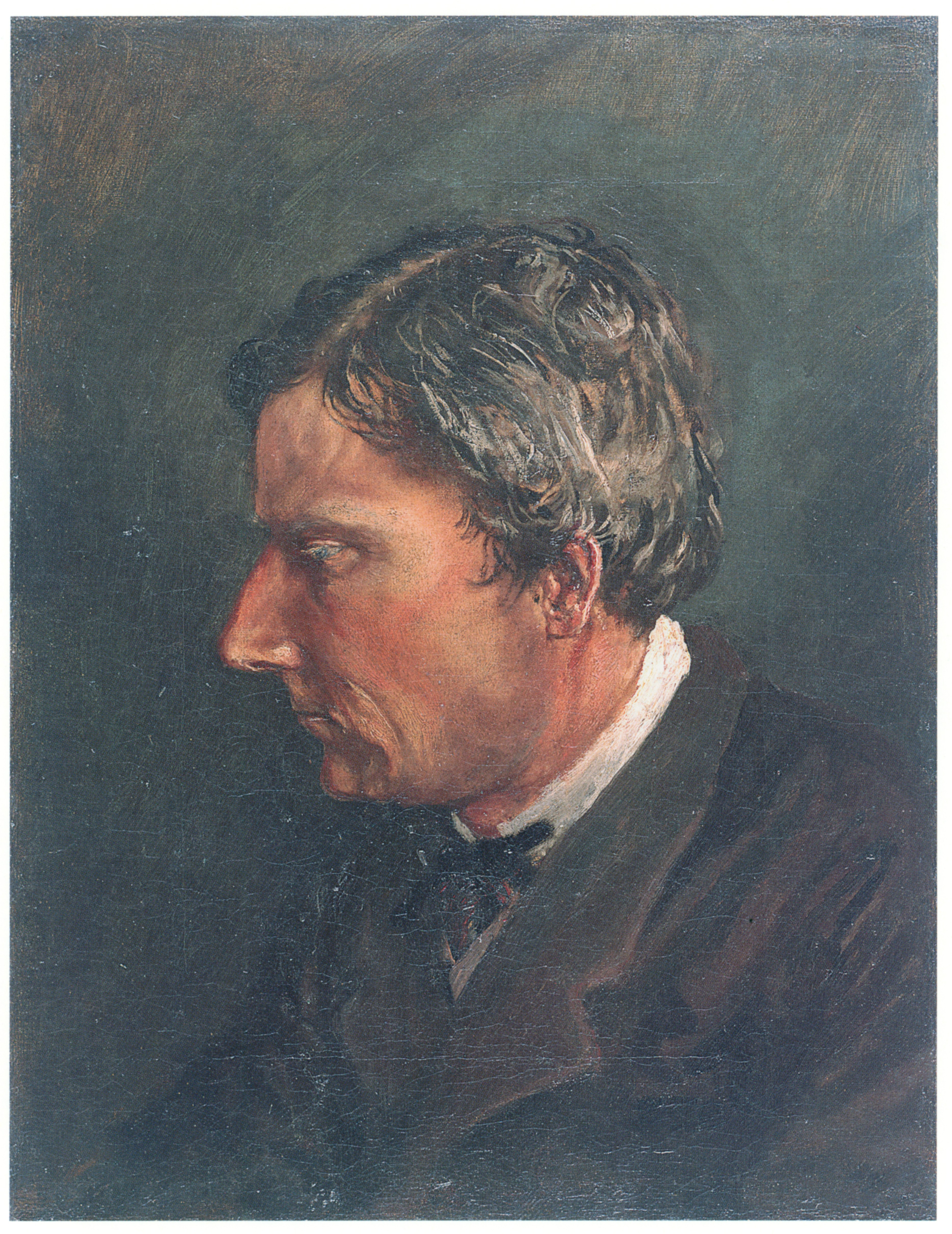
Oil portrait of Charles Wirgman, by his apprentice Takahashi Yuichi

Charles Wirgman (31 August 1832 – 8 February 1891) was an English artist, caricaturist and editorial cartoonist, the creator of the Japan Punch and illustrator in China and Meiji period-Japan for the Illustrated London News.

Wirgman was the eldest son of Ferdinand Charles Wirgman (1806–1857) and brother of Theodore Blake Wirgman. He married Ozawa Kane in 1863, and the couple had one son.

Wirgman arrived in Japan in 1861 as a correspondent for the Illustrated London News, and resided in Yokohama from 1861 until his death. He published the first magazine in Japan, the Japan Punch, monthly between 1862 and spring 1887. Like its British namesake, the magazine was written in a humorous, often satirical manner, and was illustrated with Wirgman's cartoons.

Wirgman formed a partnership called "Beato & Wirgman, Artists and Photographers" with Felice Beato from 1864 to 1867. Wirgman again produced illustrations derived from Beato's photographs while Beato photographed some of Wirgman's sketches and other works.

Wirgman taught western-style drawing and painting techniques to a number of Japanese artists, possibly including the ukiyo-e artist Kobayashi Kiyochika. From 1865 he had Goseda Yoshimatsu and Kanō Tomonobu as his pupils. In 1866 he taught Takahashi Yuichi, sponsoring his work for the International Exposition of 1867. He also was briefly an English tutor, most notably to the future Admiral Tōgō, then a young cadet.

In the 1860s, he accompanied British envoy Sir Ernest Satow on a number of journeys around Japan as described in Satow's Diplomat in Japan.

Wirgman's grave is in the Yokohama Foreign General Cemetery.

== See also ==
- Anglo-Japanese relations
- Georges Ferdinand Bigot
