= Effect of Snow on Petit-Montrouge =

Painting by Édouard Manet

- Effet de neige à Petit-Montrouge (French)
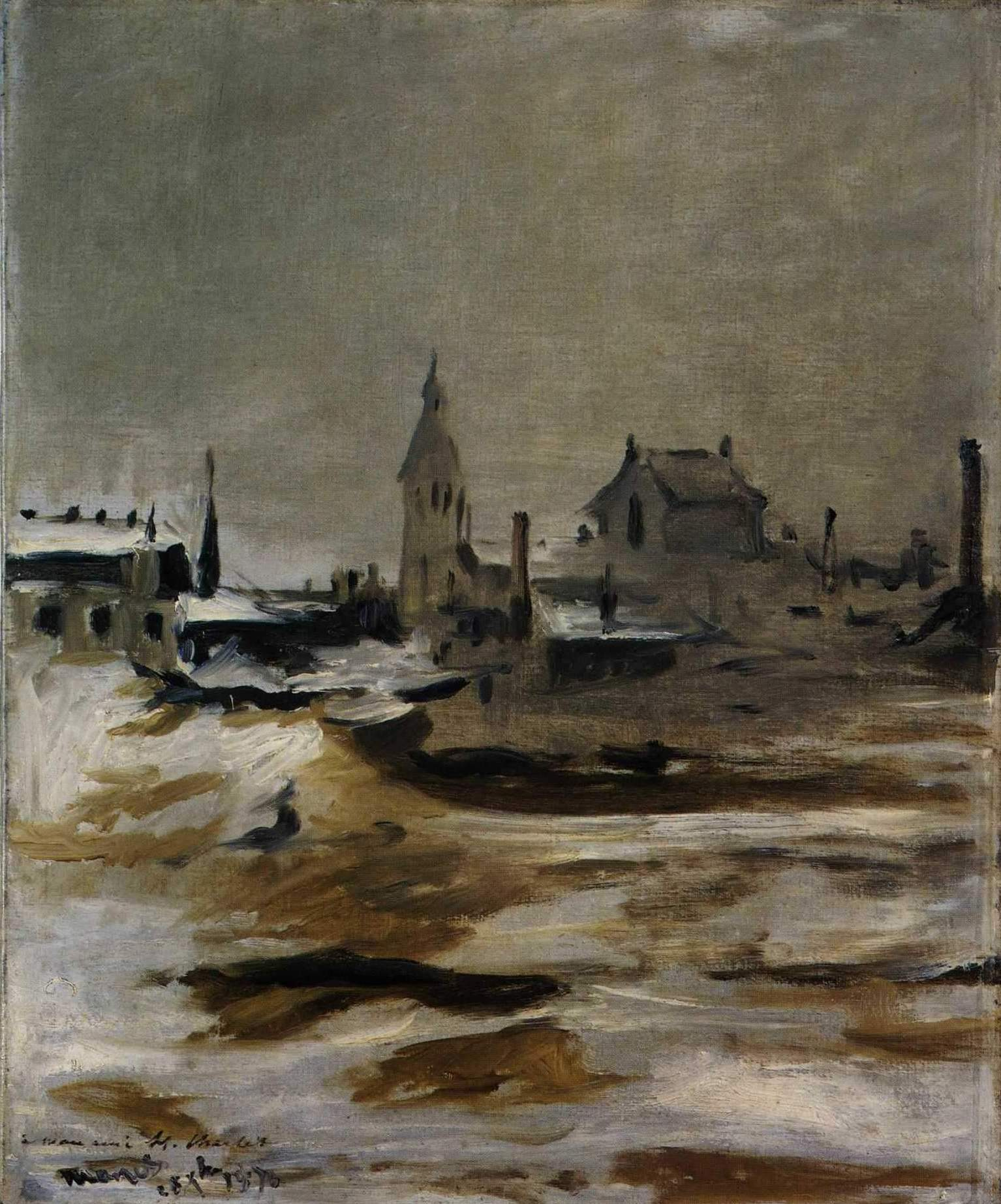
- Artist: Édouard Manet
- Year: 1870
- Medium: Oil on Canvas
- Dimensions: 59.7 cm × 49.7 cm (23.5 in × 19.6 in)
- Location: National Museum Cardiff, Cardiff

Effect of Snow on Petit-Montrouge (French: Effet de neige à Petit-Montrouge) is an 1870 landscape painting by the French painter Édouard Manet. The 61.6 cm x 50.4 cm oil on canvas composition depicts the 14th arrondissement's district, Petit-Montrouge, under a wintry landscape.

== History ==
The oil on canvas painting shows a winter view of Petit-Montrouge, an area in the 14th arrondissement of Paris. Manet painted this picture while a member of the National Guard during the 1870–71 Siege of Paris of the Franco-Prussian War. As opposed to the history painters of his time, Manet does not show a heroic view of battle, but rather the dusky ambiance of a looming battle. The image reflects Manet's loss of hope about the military situation, his profound loneliness, and the deprivation he suffered during this time. It is one of the few landscapes in Manet's oeuvre, and is one of his first plein air paintings. Today this work is in the collection of the National Museum Cardiff.

The painting is divided horizontally into two halves. The upper half features an almost monochromatic grey sky. The lower half of the painting is depicted in coarse brushstrokes that showcase a snowy landscape. Dividing the two halves is a horizontal line outlined with buildings; the church tower at the centre of the painting has been identified to be the bell tower of the church of St-Pierre de Montrouge, which was built in the 1860s in the Petit-Montrouge district of Paris.

The crossing tower of the church rises to the right of the bell tower. The black contours of the roof of the crossing tower are clearly contrasted with the grey of the building, while the bell tower lacks such borders and thin brushstrokes indicate the windows in the characteristic spire. The snow-covered roof of the nave can be seen between the two towers, cut through by a chimney in front of it. Further chimneys can be found to limit the horizon line on the right edge of the picture and to the right of the residential building on the left edge of the picture, the identity of which can no longer be determined today. Only the upper floor and the roof of the building cut off by the edge of the picture are executed. The windows are indicated by three black dabs of color in the grey-ochre façade. On the upper area of the black roof, the snow lying on it is sketched in high-contrast white paint. Between this house and the church and directly in front of the church there are other dark roofs covered with snow, without these buildings being able to be identified.

The lower portion of the work is dedicated to representing a landscape in front of the cityscape silhouette. Using broad strokes of black, brown, ochre and white, Manet provides an undefined and rudimentary depiction of the scenery. The area to the right is calmer and drier, likely representative of a field or similar level area. Meanwhile, the uneven patch of ochre on the left indicates a mound of earth with hints of snow. The inclusion of an earth wall in the foreground on the left of the cavas is thought to allude to the Franco-Prussian War of 1870–1871, while the general lack of military imagery and personnel is considered striking.

The painting is signed, dated and dedicated to "H. Charlet" in the lower left corner, with the inscription "à mon ami H. Charlet" and "Manet 28 Xbre 1870". As this name cannot be found in Manet's address book, art scholars assume this person was a comrade of Manet in the National Guard. The exact date of execution of the painting is uncertain, though the signature was presumably added on the noted date.

== Composition ==
The overall colour scheme is predominantly muted grey, lacking the presence of green, as if to encapsulate a wintry and overcast atmosphere, where no strong source of light illuminates the image – thus creating a lack of shadows. Manet uses earthly and muted tones to illustrate an urban snow landscape; between the large peaks of white and diagonals of murky brown the Paris district of Petit-Montrouge is depicted, overshadowed by the brown dirty snow and bleak beige sky. The buildings in the background were painted with muted colours to give an appearance of balancing precariously on a huge expanse of brown.

== Name ==
The naming etymology of the painting has experienced a long history of different iterations and translations since it left Manet's possession, as no name for the painting has survived from Manet himself and authors and translators have arrived at no uniform suggestion. As the painting has been in British possession since 1912, the majority of literature on the painting exists in English and thus translation between languages has proven difficult.

In French, the last title appearing in the artist's catalogues raisonnés is Effet de neige à Petit-Montrouge, "Snow Effect at Petit-Montrouge" from Rouart/Wildenstein in 1975, which has been assumed by the National Museum Cardiff. German titles for the painting vary, including misspellings of title from translation from French or English language sources: "Landschaft bei Petit-Mont-Rouge", "Schneeffekte bei Mont-Rouge", "Die Kirche von Petit-Montrouge, Paris", "Die Kirche von Petit-Montrouge im Schee" and "Das kleine Montrouge während des Krieges".

== Provenance ==
Effet de neige à Petit-Montrouge is not mentioned in Manet's sales documents, indicating that it is possible that he gave the painting to H. Charlet, mentioned in the dedication of the painting, shortly after it was completed. However, the Rouart/Wildenstein authors speculate that Manet gave the painting to the journalist Pierre Giffard (1853–1922), who in turn sold the painting to the Durand-Ruel art dealership in 1905. Durand-Ruel maintained possession of Effet de neige à Petit-Montrouge until October 1912, when it was acquired by the Welsh art collector Gwendoline Davies. After her death, Davies' impressive art collection, which housed this painting, was bequeathed to the present National Museum in Cardiff.

== Manet as a National Guard – background to the creation of the painting ==
In 1870, Manet took an innovative step in his artistic career by completing a work en plein air for the first time. This work, entitled In the Garden, was the first of its kind as his previous outdoor pieces arose from sketches that we later transferred to an oil canvas in his studio. On July 19 of the same year, France declared war on Prussia, with Manet taking part in the conflict as a staunch Republican opposed to the policies of Napoleon III. He spent the summer holiday with his family in Saint-Germain-en-Laye before returning to Paris in August, to observe the war's developments.

Upon the defeat of the French troops at the Battle of Sedan in 1870, Manet welcomed the proclamation of the Republic on 4 September, but recognised the danger of enemy armies advancing on Paris. He sent his mother, wife, and their son to Oloron-Sainte-Marie in the Pyrenees for safety. While some of Manet's artist friends, such as Claude Monet, had fled to London prior to the war, Manet remained in Paris and enlisted in the National Guard. During the ensuing months of the Siege of Paris, Manet, who otherwise left few written testimonies, wrote numerous letters to his family and friends, documenting the changing daily life of the capital and providing insight into his thoughts and emotional state. Since Paris had been surrounded by enemy troops from the 19 September, these letters had to be sent by balloon in order to leave the city.

At the beginning of the Siege of Paris, Manet wrote about his daily military exercises and his duty as a sentry on the fortifications surrounding the city. His letters expressed a certain patriotic confidence, but he came to lament the boredom and increasing costs of food in his latter writings. In October 1970, Manet was afflicted by a foot ailment and wrote to his wife the following month that he was "gradually dying of hunger." Three days later Manet reported the existence of slaughterhouses for cats, dogs, and rats. His experiences during the siege are believed to have inspired his etching of Snake in Front of the Butcher's Shop, which Edward Lilley interpreted as a representation of "history from below," depicting the great deprivation wreaked by the war on the general populace.

== See also ==
- List of paintings by Édouard Manet
- 1870 in art
