= Japan Punch =

Satirical comic magazine, 1862 to 1887

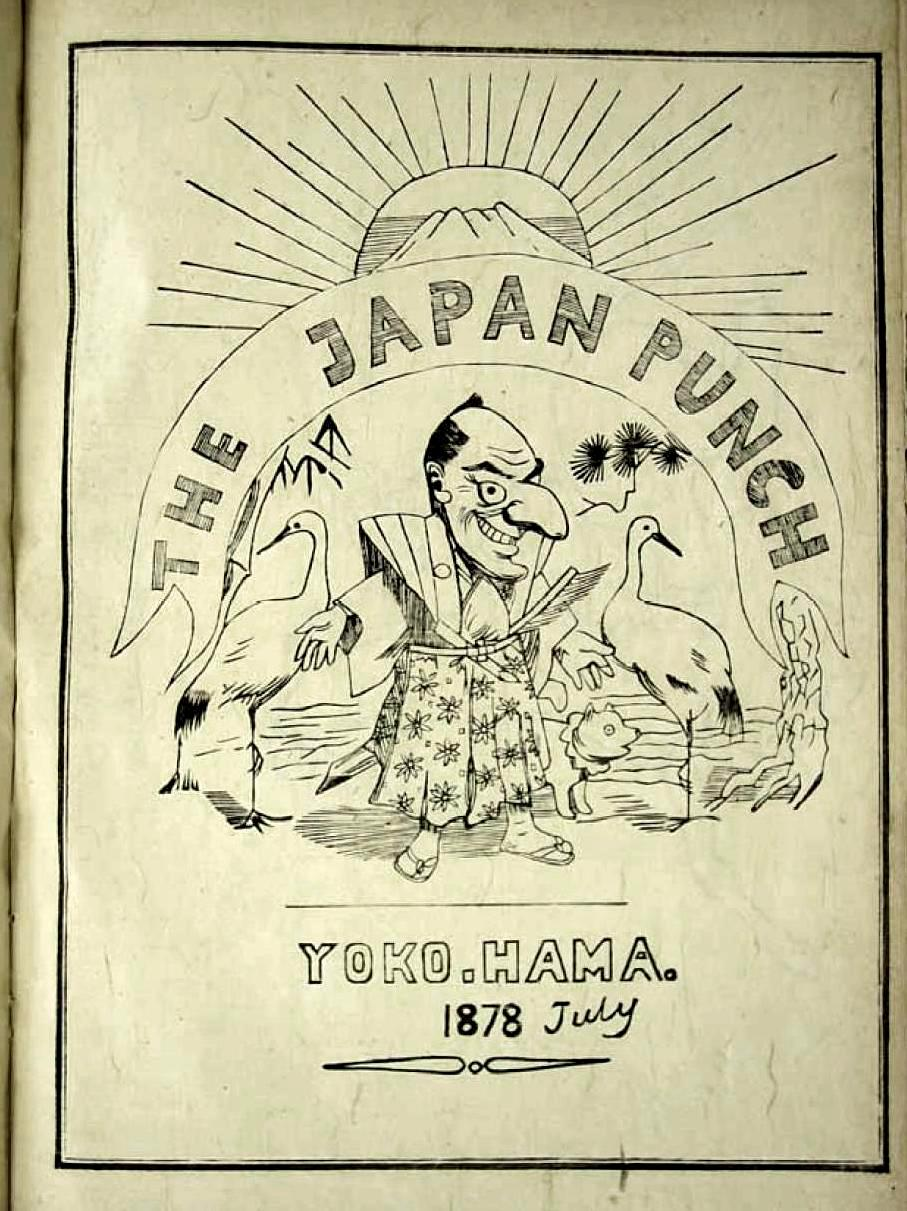
- Editor: Charles Wirgman
- Publisher: Charles Wirgman
- Founder: Charles Wirgman
- Founded: 1862
- First issue: 1862
- Final issue: 1887
- Based in: Yokohama, Japan
- Language: English

The Japan Punch was a satirical comic magazine and journal that was authored, illustrated and published by English painter and cartoonist Charles Wirgman from 1862 to 1887. The publication reflected the social context of Bakumatsu Yokohama and often depicted the frustrations that emerged from conflicts between Japanese domestic politics and early foreign settlement life in Japan. It utilised cartoons to comment and critique the media and political landscape of the social and political issues of the Meiji era. It might have been influenced by another English magazine called Punch.

== History ==
Wirgman published the Japan Punch for 25 years, from 1862 to 1887. Though the publication debuted in 1862, it is known that a total of 64 pages were printed that year, but the number of volumes are unclear, indicating that the magazine was first published irregularly. In 1865, issues were published monthly as the magazine quickly began to gain popularity amongst foreigners. It is believed that the irregularity of the Punch was due to the state of affairs between 1862 and 1865, in which the government threatened to punish those who published content that defamed or ridiculed others, leading to a brief suspension of the publication. On the other hand, some critics such as John Clark attribute this irregularity to major events that occurred in Wirgman's personal life. Clark suggests that Wirgman got married and bought a house during this time and even travelled back to England to settle some loose financial or business ends. Wirgman also clearly hinted his leave in the Punch as he exhibited it through a few of his cartoons which showcased a crowd sending him off and an implication of his destination, London. In 1865, he resurrected the Punch by attributing his absence and marking his return to failure in "searching for truth." Wirgman then maintained a regular pace of about ten to twelve issues per year till the end of the publication. He also expanded the Punch's boundaries from criticising media press and satirising local society to focusing on and revealing the irrationality and issues within treaty port life, critiquing human deficiencies of greed and self-centredness, and domestic politics revolving around the Japanese civil war and the Meiji Restoration.

Wirgman produced over 200 issues of the magazine, in which each issue consists of about 10 pages and made use of various Japanese techniques. It was mainly produced through woodblock printing on the Japanese paper washi, but lithography was also used from 1883 onwards and the Japanese style of stitching was also used.

The title of the publication is named after and alluded to the original British version or equivalent, the Punch (The London Charivari), in which "Punch" is short for "Punchinello," from the traditional puppet show Punch and Judy. The cover of the debut issue of the Japan Punch featured the original British Punch's mascot, a grinning hand puppet known as "Mr Punch" to exhibit its affiliation or relation to the original. The impetus for the creation or existence of the Japan Punch is generally attributed to its scrutiny of members of the Yokohama press and their imperious opinions. A major newspaper of the settlement, the Japan Herald, threatened "punishment of no gentle character" towards those who defaced circular documents, provoking Wirgman to respond and criticise them through his series of cartoons in the Japan Punch, as depicted in the publication's content in the first year where its pages were filled with attacks and parodies of the editorial style of the settlement's major newspaper and its publisher, Albert Hansard.

== Features ==
The Japan Punch featured humorous commentaries on follies within port treaty life, international relations in Japan, domestic Japanese politics, criticised and satirised media press and prominent figures in diplomacy and business. It also outlined diversity within the foreign settlement of Yokohama as Wirgman noted in the Punch that businesses were owned by people varying from “337 nationalities”. Wirgman even utilised comics to his advantage and attempted to include and communicate to all by writing in multiple languages which included English, French, Italian, Latin, Japanese, Chinese and Dutch. This was due to Wirgman being a skilled linguist, who was fluent in English, German and French and his competence in various languages.

Dipsomaniacs YTO BbI KYIIIaAN calidum cum dai ski c'est pourquoi taking all cosas into consideration 我の意 said fufu confused e bigen no tubig, pero notwithstanding al fui se paga todo que es la pena del infieruo et cela does not boot me but it...

— Cassi Ape' Belatti Pamme leau, The Japan Punch, Vol.1

=== Style ===
The Japan Punch is characterised as a satirical cartoon magazine whose scrutiny of Japan's politics and society was able to inform the foreign community of Yokohama of Japan's domestic political and social issues which were often imperceptible to foreigners. The publication exerts parodies of purple prose and heavily uses rhetorical elements such as alliteration and pathetic fallacy to communicate their critique. Wirgman ridiculed and scrutinised the 'high-handed opinions' of the Yokohama press in the publication by parodying the 'high-minded prospectus' of the Japan Herald through non-sensical rhyming and ornate yet often misspelled and ungrammatical language which would become the trademark or signature style of the Japan Punch. Wirgman's distinctive writing style has been characterised as a type of 'deadpan playfulness' to which academic John Clark describes as representative of his 'engaging, eccentric, polyglot' personality.

=== Cartoons ===
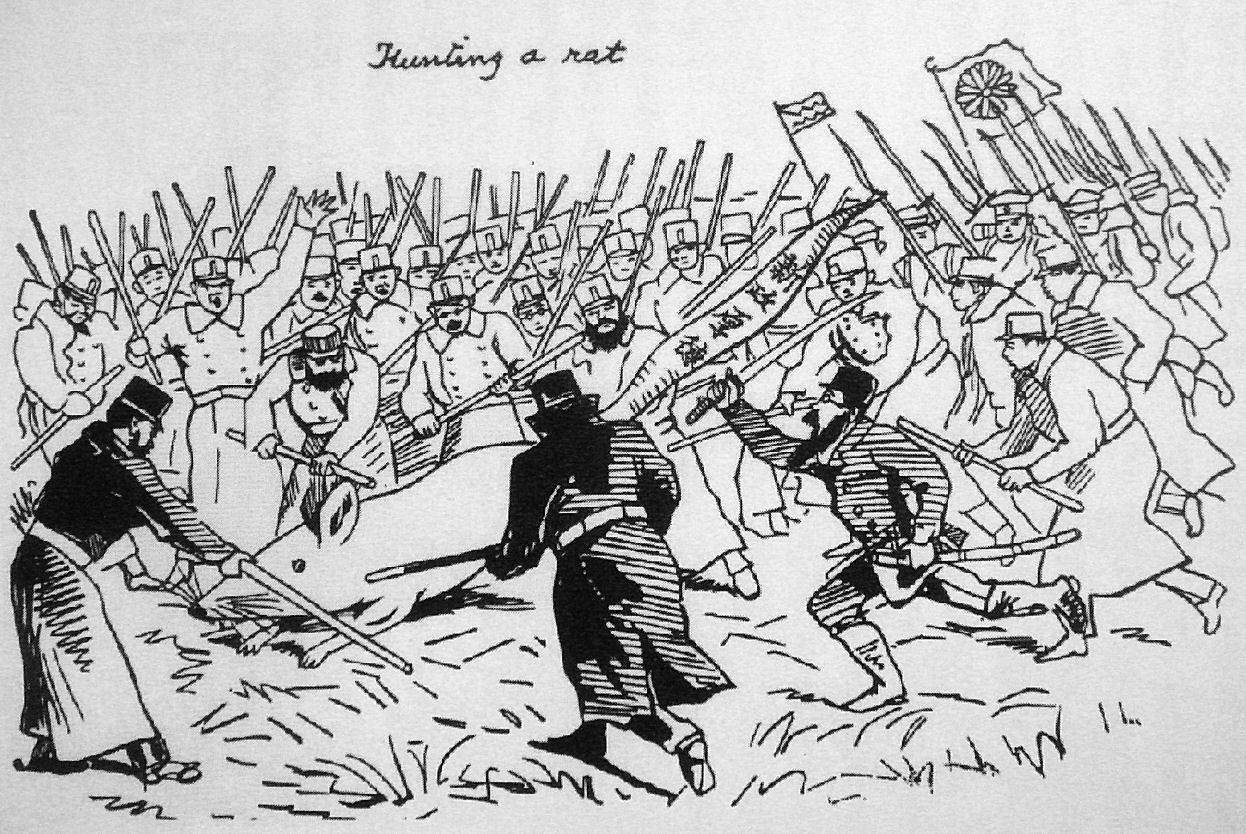
Japan Punch April 1877 Issue

The cartoons illustrated in the Japan Punch are characterised as political cartoons and are generally regarded as a prototype for political cartoons. The cartoons are also considered as caricatures, a prototype or early form of manga and punch pictures. A key feature or cartoon of the publication is the figure of Mr. Punch who appears in every issue and is always represented through frivolous or silly costuming and his arched eyebrows. Otsuka Eiji attributes and outlines the Japan Punch's cartoons as an early form of manga which were independent and consisted of single-framed illustrations that satirised religious leaders, aristocrats and politicians as well as social manners and customs. Furthermore, the Japan Punch's illustrations maintains its unlikeness and uniqueness through its localisation of 'punch pictures' by adapting and assimilating it to Japanese elements which distinguishes it from subtle similarities between Edmund Lear's illustrations and other punch artists, which some critics have noted.

== Reception ==
The Japan Punch was typically received well by its target audience, the foreign community in Yokohama. As the publication addressed Japanese politics, society and people which were often topics limited to news items, it sparked great interest from the community. In addition, with a few hundred copies in circulation, the magazine became popular with foreigners which prompted Wirgman to shift from publishing irregularly to a monthly basis. The Punch was also able to capture the Japanese audience as it was eventually translated and established a wider audience abroad. However, contemporary audiences may not understand Wirgman's work as insufficient understanding of the social context render the cartoons to be indecipherable and also due to the vituperative humour that has lost its significance and humour overtime. Despite popular reception by the community, many critics of the period condemned the publication, in particularly those that were critiqued and parodied in the Punch. Some critics responded to Wirgman's attacks in their own publications. The Japan Herald's publisher, Hansard composed an article in the June 7th, 1862 edition of the newspaper, titled ‘The Current Libels’, which would ultimately place restrictions and interfere with the Punch's regularity in publication for a brief period of time. The article highlighted the Lord Chief Justice's involvement in this issue as it claimed his words:

“We have heard it stated, in a quarter likely to be well informed, that H.B.M.’s Charge d’Affaires has expressed his intention to take any steps necessary to suppress that nuisance which has lately existed in the community so offensive to the respectable portion of it and so likely to lead to numerous breaches of the peace. We rejoice to have hard this, and heartily trust the report is well founded, for there is a point beyond which it is well that even the most patient and forbearing should not be strained. The community have the remedy in their own hands. If a man publishes deliberately and wilfully anything concerning another which renders him ridiculous an action lies against him.”

— Lord Chief Justice Wilmot, The Japan Herald, June 7th 1982

== Legacy ==
=== History of Yokohama ===
The publication remains as a valuable source of information on the Yokohama region's foreign settlement, politics and social issues of the Meiji era. The illustrations of the publication serve as a memory of the era and allow for comparison between contemporary Yokohama and Meiji era Yokohama. Furthermore, the critic Todd Munson describes the publication as 'good evidence' as it preserves the observations of a first-hand witness of Bakumatsu Yokohama. The geography and landscape of the region is also preserved in the publication as journals such as The Athenaeum records the scenery of the region in detail, based from the Japan Punch's illustrations. The Punch serves as contemporary history for future generations to learn and laugh from and its cartoons serve as insightful and witty criticisms of the media landscape of its time.

=== Cartoons/ Manga ===
The Japan Punch has made a considerable impact and influence on Japanese comic art or manga. It is considered as the first comic magazine to appear in Japan. and historians frequently regard the publication as a prototype for Japanese political cartoons but also for manga as well. Wirgman, along with Georges Bigot is credited for introducing or bringing the conventions or elements of modern comics to Japan and for the introduction of speech balloons or bubbles, which shaped the conventions of manga. Historian, John Clark suggests that the Japan Punch introduced the European notion of 19th century visual satire to Japan to which he explains as once regarded as a visually absurd and grotesque practice that was prohibited in Japan. He also suggests that the publication had an influence on Kobayashi Kiyochika in the Mamoru Chibun, a Japanese satirical newspaper which featured speech bubbles and wild linguistic and visual puns, similar to those of the Japan Punch. Its significance extends to the extent that 'ponchi'(punch), a Japanese word derived from the name of the title of the publication has replaced words that previously meant caricature Hence, many people consider Wirgman and the Punch as a precursor of modern comics as it effectively established the ‘punch’ genre in Japan. To this day, there is an annual ceremony honouring Wirgman at his grave in Yokohama.

== See also ==
- Charles Wirgman
- Punch
- Editorial cartoon
