= Kawakami Tōgai =

Japanese painter (1828–1881)

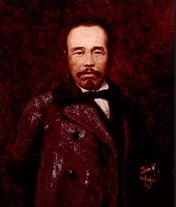
Kawakami Tōgai, portrait by Koyama Shōtarō

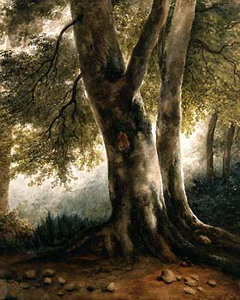
Forest

Kawakami Tōgai, originally Hiroshi (Japanese:川上 冬崖; 22 July 1828, Nagano Prefecture - 3 May 1881, Atami) was a Japanese painter; one of the first to work in the yōga (Western) style.

== Life and work ==
His birth name was Yamagishi Mannojō, but was later adopted by the Kawakamis; a family of the minor nobility. As a young man, he went to Edo (Tokyo) and studied painting with Ōnishi Chinnen, a follower of the Shijō school. He then found work at the Bansho Shirabesho (roughly; Institute for the Study of Barbarian Books) where he translated books in Dutch that dealt with Western-style painting. He was still employed there in 1862 when it was renamed the Yōsho Shirabesho (Institute for the Study of Western books).

After the Meiji Restoration in 1868, he worked at the "South Department" of the Tokyo Daigakkō, which would eventually become the University of Tokyo. He also worked for the Ministry of Culture and the Imperial Japanese Navy General Staff, where he did drafting and made charts.

While studying cartography, he decided to open an art school at his own home in the Shitaya district, where he taught Western-style painting. He also wrote a textbook on the subject, although his own knowledge was drawn mostly from books. Among his notable students were Takahashi Yuichi, Koyama Shōtarō, Matsuoka Hisashi, Kawamura Kiyoo and Nakamaru Seijūrō.

In addition to his paintings, he produced numerous ink drawings in the nanga style. Many critics consider these to be superior works.

In his later years (after 1878), he worked for the map section at the Ministry of the Army. In 1881, there was a scandal involving secret army maps that had been given to the Chinese embassy. Although his subordinates were the guilty parties, he took full responsibility and committed suicide.

== Sources ==
- Tokyo National Museum, Meiji no yōga – Meiji no toō gaka. Nihon Bijutsuin, Vol. 350, 1995.
- Tazawa, Yutaka: "Kawakami Tōgai". In: Biographical Dictionary of Japanese Art. Kodansha International, 1981. ISBN 0-87011-488-3.
