= Kawamura Kiyoo =

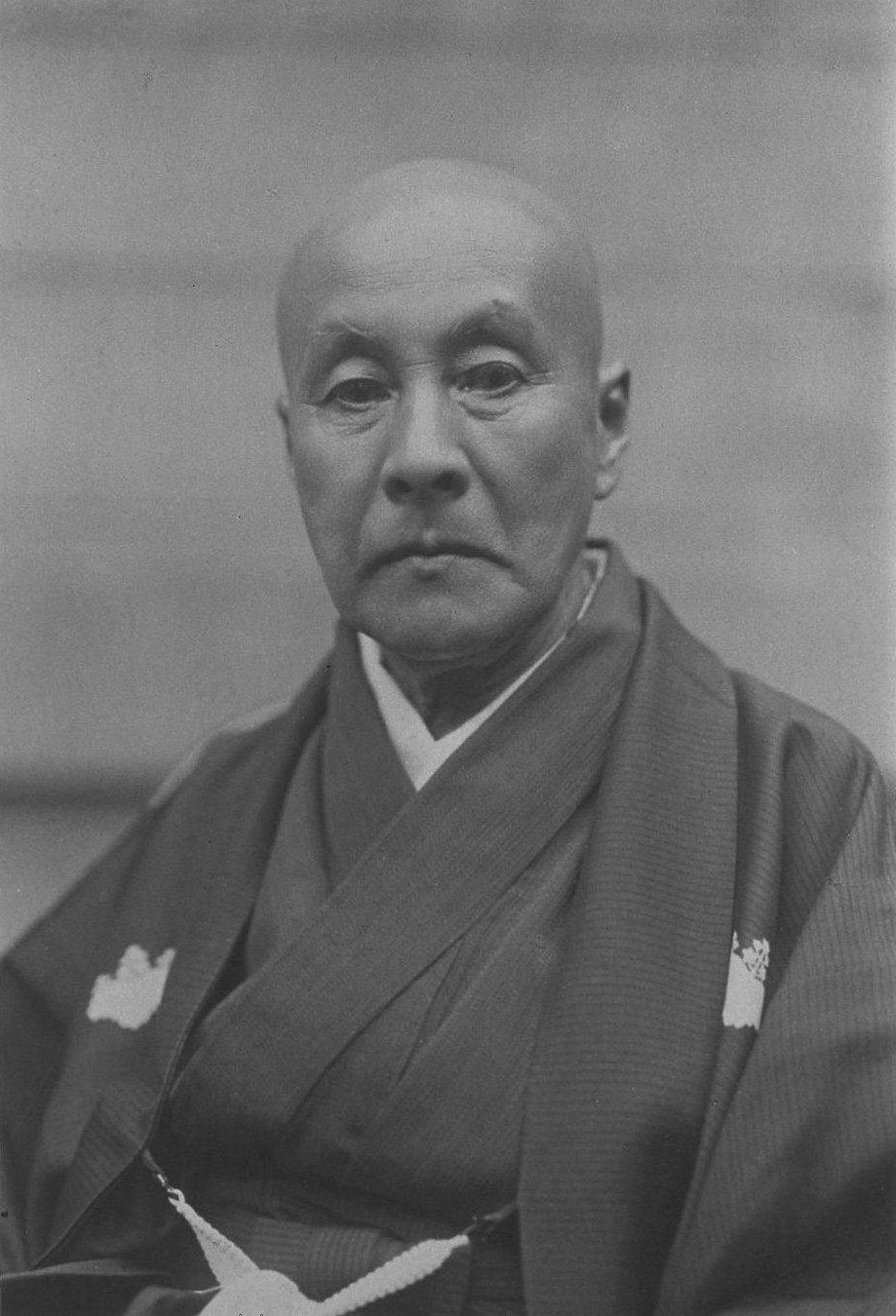
- Kawamura Kiyoo in 1929
- Born: 1852
- Died: 1934 (aged 81–82)
- Known for: Painting
- Movement: Yōga

Kawamura Kiyoo (川村清雄) (1852–1934) was a yōga artist in Meiji to Shōwa Japan.

== Life ==
Born in Edo in 1852, as a child he began to study under Sumiyoshi Naiki (住吉内記), before moving to Osaka prior to his grandfather's appointment as bugyō (magistrate). Continuing his education under Tanomura Chokunyū (田能村直入), after returning to Edo he studied for a time with Haruki Nanmei (春木南溟) before learning yōga from Kawakami Tōgai (川上冬崖), in around 1868.

Initially sponsored by Katsu Kaishū, with Tokugawa support he studied political law in the United States of America in 1871, travelling the following year to France and Italy. In Venice, he turned to the study of painting. Returning to Japan in 1881, he worked for the Ministry of Finance Printing Bureau before resigning over a disagreement and opening a school for painting in Kōjimachi.

In 1889, he participated in the formation of the Meiji Bijutsukai (明治美術会), the first domestic art association to champion western-style painting. Within a decade the association had been eclipsed by Kuroda Seiki's Hakubakai (白馬会).

Kawamura Kiyoo often painted in western-style oil on traditional Japanese supports of silk and wood. He died in Tenri in 1934.

== Selected paintings ==
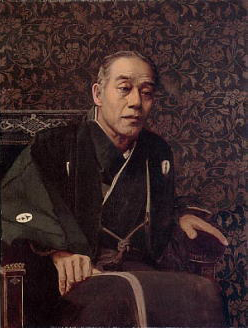
Fukuzawa Yukichi

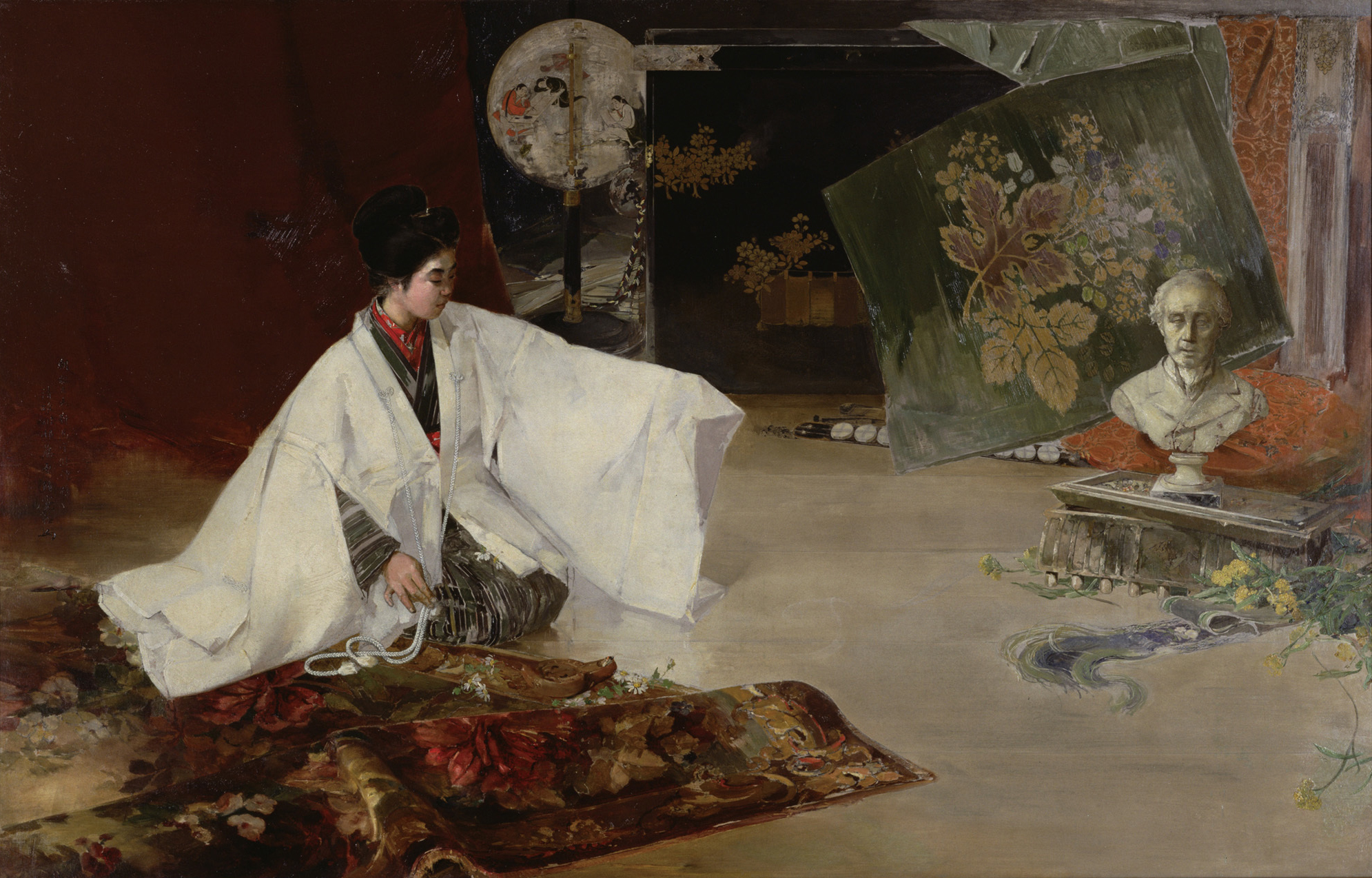
Summer Airing

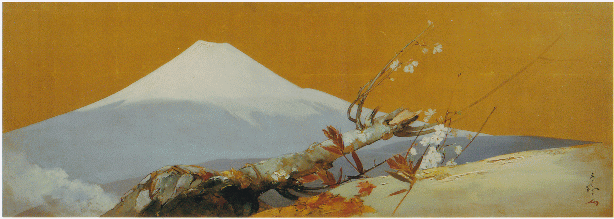
Mount Fuji with Cherries

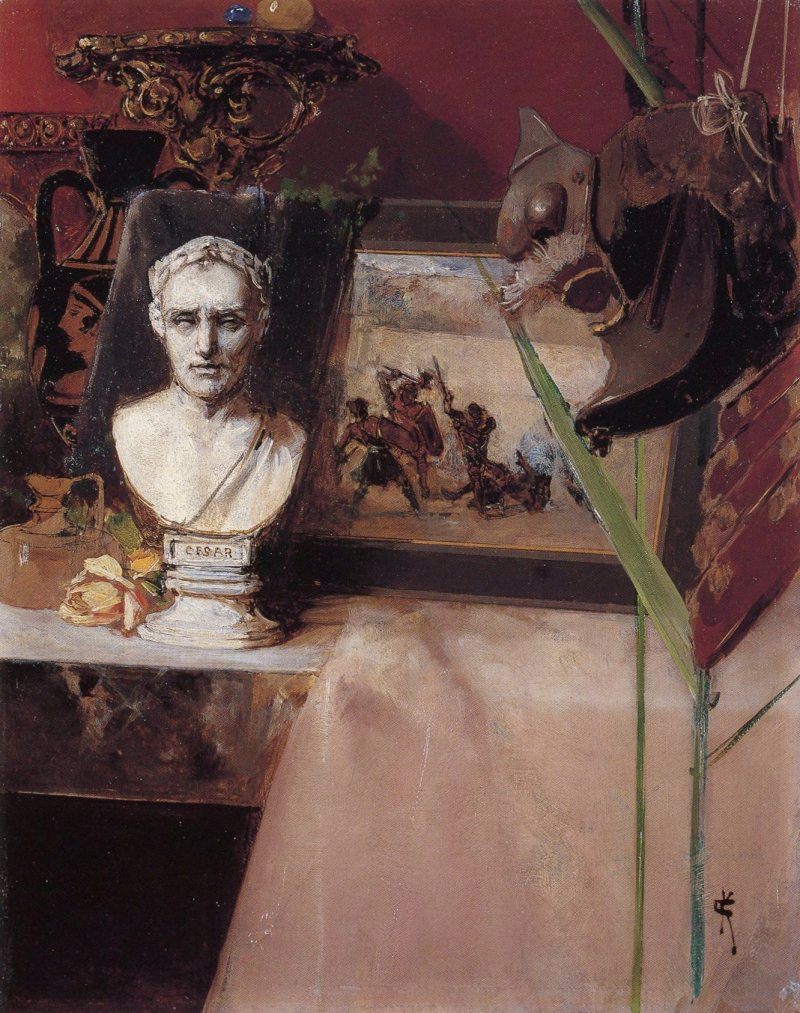
Interior Still-life

== See also ==
- Founding of the Nation
- Takahashi Yuichi
