= Moorish Bath (painting) =

Painting by Jean-Léon Gérôme

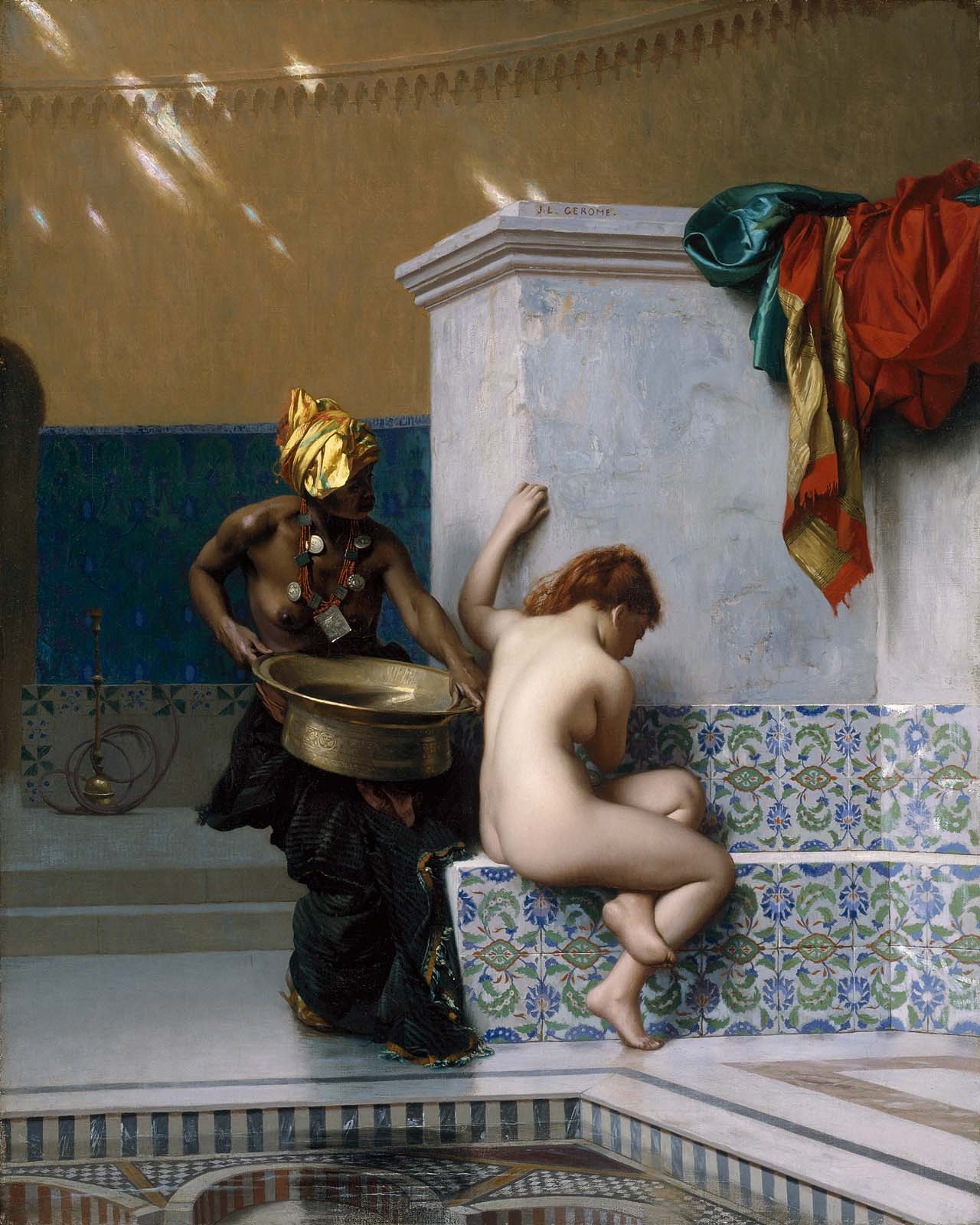
- Artist: Jean-Léon Gérôme
- Year: 1870
- Medium: Oil on canvas, genre painting
- Dimensions: 50.8 cm × 40.6 cm (20.0 in × 16.0 in)
- Location: Museum of Fine Arts, Boston

Moorish Bath is an 1870 Orientalist genre painting by the French artist Jean-Léon Gérôme. It depicts a scene in a Hammam somewhere in the Middle East, featuring a woman likely to be a Circassian and an African attendant.

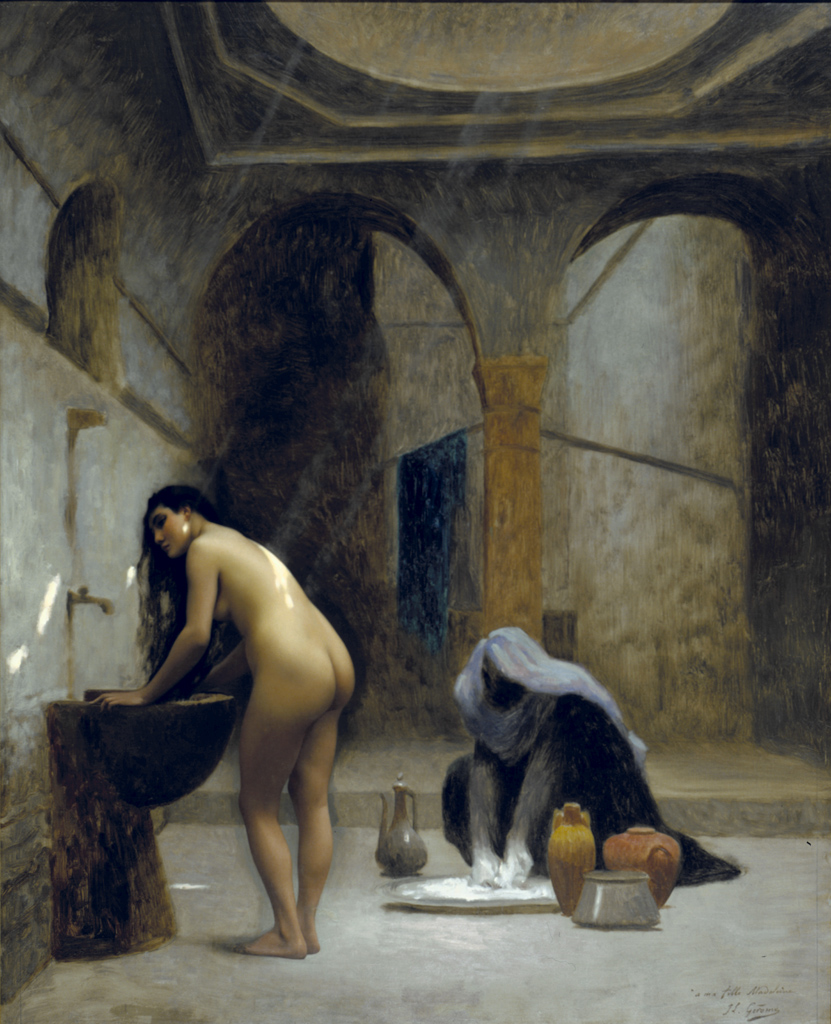
Moorish Bath, c.1877, in the Rhode Island School of Design Museum

The painting was exhibited at the 1873 World Fair held in Vienna. Currently it is in the collection of the Museum of Fine Arts in Boston, having been acquired in 1924. A print based on the picture was produced by the engraver Charles Courtry in 1874.

Inspired by his 1868 trip to Egypt, Gérôme produced a number of scenes of Oriental bathhouses over the next twenty years of which this was the first. These offered an opportunity to contrast a more exotic model with the traditional Academic nude. Another larger, similarly, themed-work Moorish Bath is now in the Rhode Island School of Design Museum.

== Bibliography ==
- Allan, Scott & Morton, Mary G. Reconsidering Gérôme. Getty Publications, 2010.
- Ackerman, Gerald M. The Life and Work of Jean-Léon Gérôme. Sotheby's Publications, 1986.
- Facos, Michelle. An Introduction to Nineteenth-Century Art. Taylor & Francis, 2011.
- Slimmon, Ann H & Singsen, Judith A. (ed.) European Painting and Sculpture, Ca. 1770-1937, in the Museum of Art, Rhode Island School of Design. University of Pennsylvania Press, 1991.
