= Davidee Itulu =

Inuk artist (1929-2006)

- Born: June 4, 1929; Tujjaat, near Cape Dorset, Nunavut
- Died: April 15, 2006 (aged 76)

Davidee Itulu (June 4, 1929 – April 15, 2006) was an Inuk artist. Itulu was born in Tujjaat, near Cape Dorset, Nunavut. He moved to Kimmirut in the 1950s.

Itulu is known for his scrimshaw carvings, a technique he learned from James Houston. His work often depicted animals native to the Arctic region, including seals, geese, bears, birds, whales, fish, and walruses.

His work is included in the collections of the Musée national des beaux-arts du Québec, National Gallery of Canada, the University of Michigan Museum of Art, the Canadian Museum of History, the Scott Polar Research Institute at the University of Cambridge, the Winnipeg Art Gallery and the Minneapolis Institute of Art. His disc number was E7-1042.

Itulu died of cancer at age 76, in 2006. He left behind a wife, Eva, and several children (daughters Elisapee, Lucy, Lau St. Laurent, Naiomi, Lallie, and Leesee, and sons Kulula, Charlie, Jimmie, Terry, Tommy, and Mark).
