= Royal Academy Exhibition of 1929 =

1929 art exhibition in London

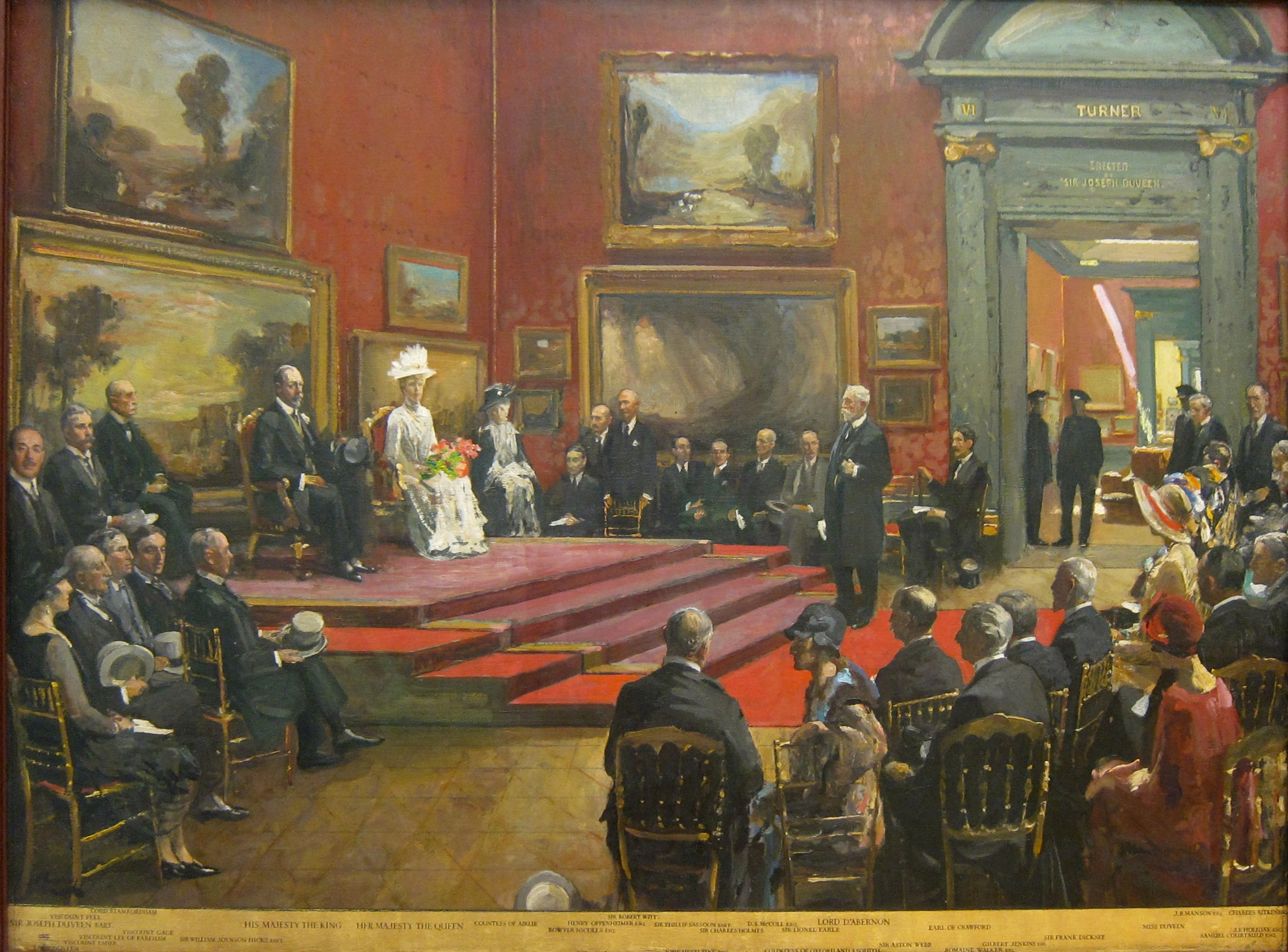
The Opening of the Modern Foreign and Sargent Galleries at the Tate Gallery by John Lavery

The Royal Academy Exhibition of 1929 was an art exhibition staged by the British Royal Academy of Arts. The Hundred and sixty first annual Summer Exhibition, it was held at Burlington House in London from 6 May to 19 August 1929. It took place a few months before the Wall Street Crash begin, ending the general prosperity of the decade. The Sphere newspaper published the selection committee choosing which works would be displayed, which it claimed was the first ever photograph of the discreet event. Amongst those shown was the current President of the Royal Academy William Llewellyn.

Two of the most of notable paintings were produced by Irish artists. Seán Keating's Night Candles are Burnt Out depicting the construction of the Ardnacrusha Dam on the River Shannon in the Irish Free State, while John Lavery exhibited The Opening of the Modern Foreign and Sargent Galleries at the Tate Gallery. The latter depicts the opening of new galleries at the Tate Gallery in Pimlico by George V in 1926.

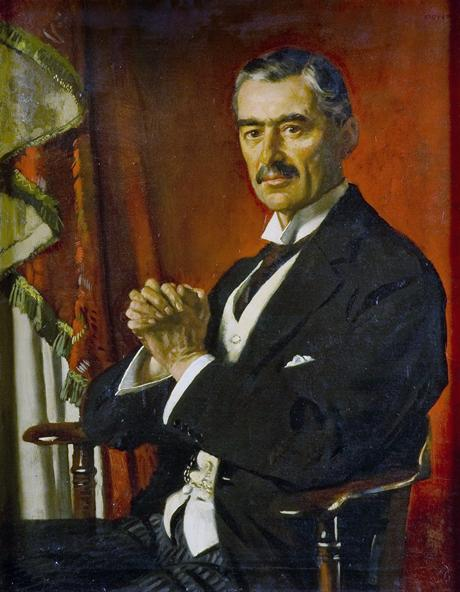
Portrait of Neville Chamberlain by William Orpen.

Another Irish painter William Orpen displayed a portrait of the politician and future Prime Minister Neville Chamberlain.

== Bibliography ==
- The Exhibition of the Royal Academy of Arts. Royal Academy, 1929.
