= Founding of the Nation =

1929 painting by Kawamura Kiyoo

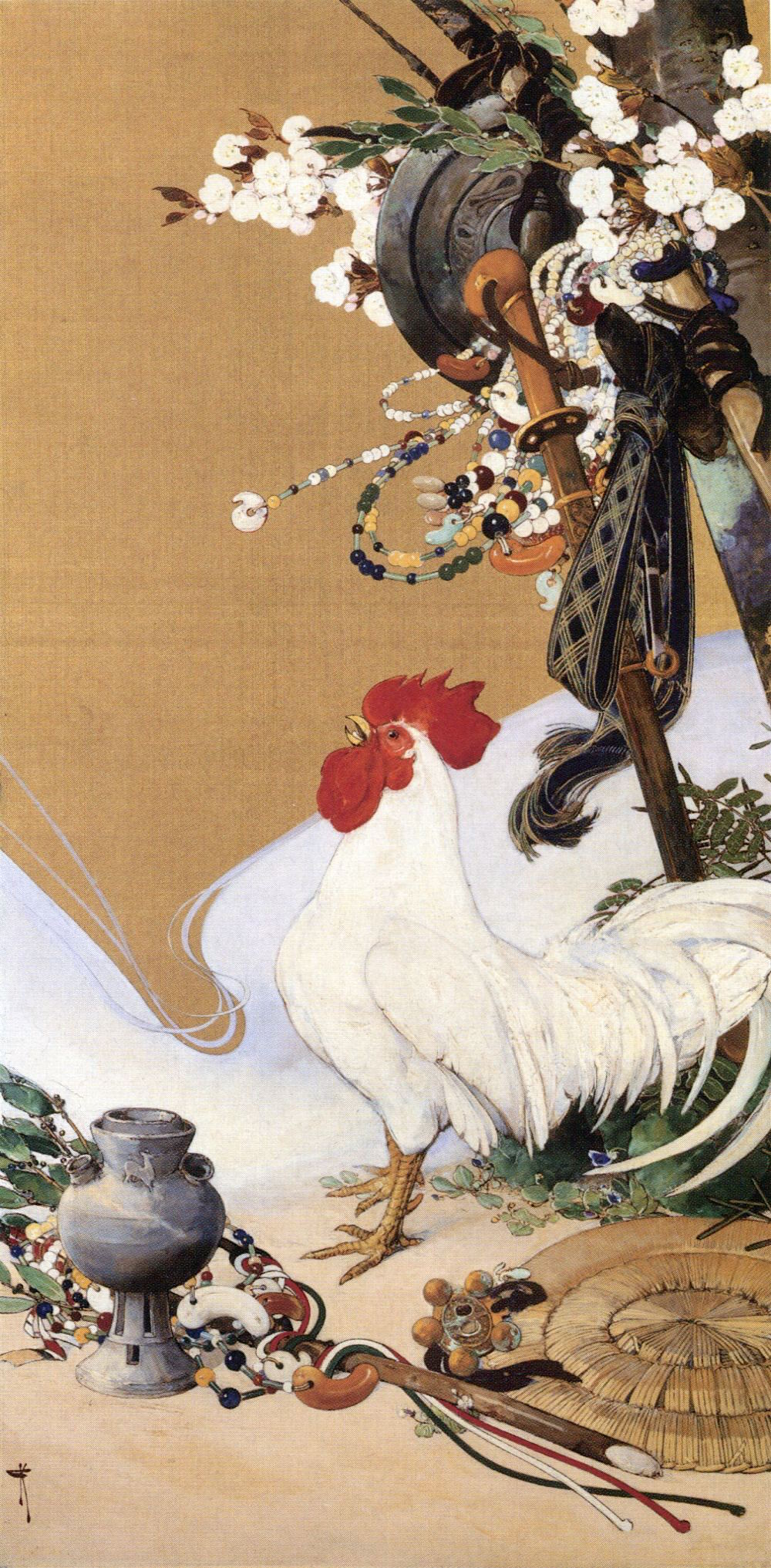
Founding of the Nation (1929) by Kawamura Kiyoo; oil and gold on silk; 148 centimetres (58 in) by 74 centimetres (29 in) (2:1); the artist's signature in the bottom left corner takes the form of an overlaid K and C, for Kiyo Cawamura

Founding of the Nation (建国, Kenkoku) is a 1929 oil painting by Japanese yōga artist Kawamura Kiyoo (1854–1932). Based on the myth of the cave of the sun goddess from the Kojiki, the painting resides at the Musée Guimet in Paris, where it is known as Le coq blanc or The white cockerel.

== Subject ==
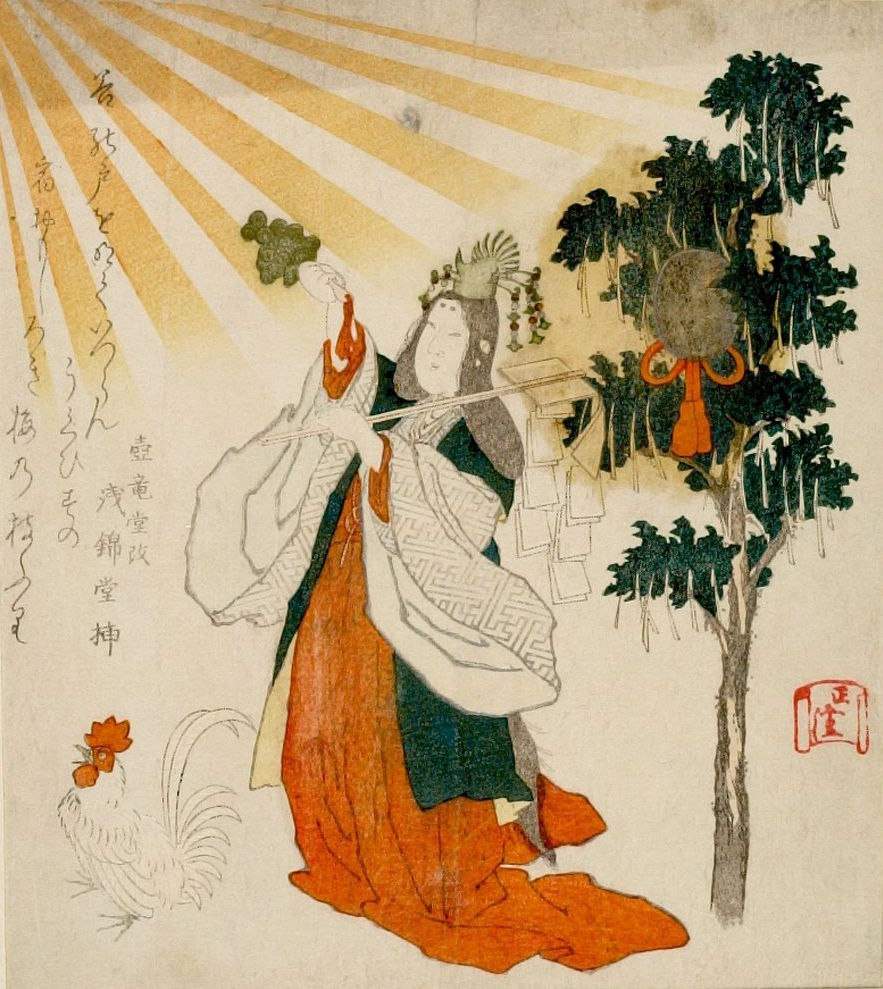
The Goddess Uzume with Rooster and Mirror (Edo-period woodblock print); Uzume's dance is linked with the origins of kagura; here she wields kagura suzu

According to the Musée d'Orsay catalogue, the painting's principal subject is représentation animalière or the depiction of animals. As suggested by the painting's Japanese name and observed in the contemporary Japanese press, the work draws heavily on Japanese mythology, in particular the episode of the sun goddess Amaterasu's withdrawal into a cave due to her brother Susanoo's improprieties, depriving the land of light.

In the Kojiki version, after the assembled kami took counsel, "the long-singing birds of eternal night" (generally understood as a periphrasis for "the barndoor fowl") were enticed to crow, the mirror Yata no Kagami and string of curved jewels Yasakani no Magatama were commissioned, divination was performed using the shoulder blade of a stag and the bough of a cherry tree from Mount Kagu, and the mirror, string of jewels, and blue and white cloth offerings were hung from an uprooted sakaki tree. Uzume then decked herself out before performing a lewd dance upon a sounding-board; the ensuing hilarity finally succeeded in provoking Amaterasu's curiosity. Opening the door to her cave, she was presented with a mirror; opening it further, she was drawn from it by her hand as well as by rope. Later a penitent Susanoo presented to her the third of the Three Sacred Treasures, the sword Ame-no-Murakumo-no-Tsurugi.

Replete with allusions to this story, Kawamura Kiyoo's painting features a mirror, magatama, sword, suzu, sakaki with blue, white, and red cloth cords, cherry blossoms, a blue-grey Sue ware footed ritual vessel adorned with a deer, and an enza or circular woven straw mat. At its centre is a white cockerel with a brilliant scarlet crest. The cockerel that crows at dawn has obvious associations with the sun goddess; a rite at Amaterasu's great shrine at Ise Jingū sees priests crow "like a rooster" before entering. Here it ushers in a "golden dawn". Contemporary notices in the French press describe it as a "Gallic cock greeting the rising sun of Japan", a symbol of Franco-Japanese friendship. (Note: « il représente un coq gaulois saluant le soleil levant du Japon, symbole du l'amitié franco-japonais » (Le Petit Journal 1929.12.31); « un coq gaulois saluant de ses chants joyeux le soleil levant » (Le Temps 1930.1.1); « N'est-ce pas là le coq gaulois qui salue la montée du Soleil Levant, du Nippon? » (Sylvain Lévi, in his address of 1929.12.30))

== History ==
Inscribed on the back of the painting is "Japan · Kawamura Kiyoo, aged 78 · 6th day, 4th month, Shōwa 4 (1929)". (Note: 「日本 川村清雄七十八歳 昭和四年四月六日」) With Indologist and Sanskrit scholar Sylvain Lévi acting as intermediary, the painting was presented on 30 December that year to the Jeu de Paume, the museum created in 1922 out of the foreign section of the Musée du Luxembourg. In attendance at the handover ceremony at the Louvre were minister Pierre Marraud and ambassador Mineichirō Adachi, as well as Lévi who delivered the celebratory address. Painted by Kawamura Kiyoo specially for the French museum, Lévi on his third visit to Japan had originally wanted to acquire one of Kawamura's Venetian landscapes but was persuaded otherwise by the artist.

Subsequently, the painting passed from the Jeu de Paume to the Musée National d'Art Moderne, before being assigned to the Musée d'Orsay, where it was housed between 1980 and 1986, when it was deposited at the Musée Guimet. In 2012/13 it returned to Japan for the exhibition "Kawamura Kiyoo: yōga painter of the Meiji Restoration", held at the Edo-Tokyo Museum and Shizuoka Prefectural Museum of Art. (Note: 「維新の洋画家 川村清雄」)

== Gallery ==
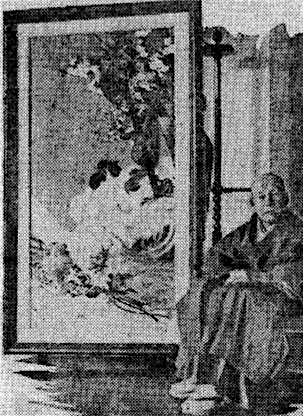
Kawamura Kiyoo with Founding of the Nation, Hōchi Shimbun, 6 April 1929

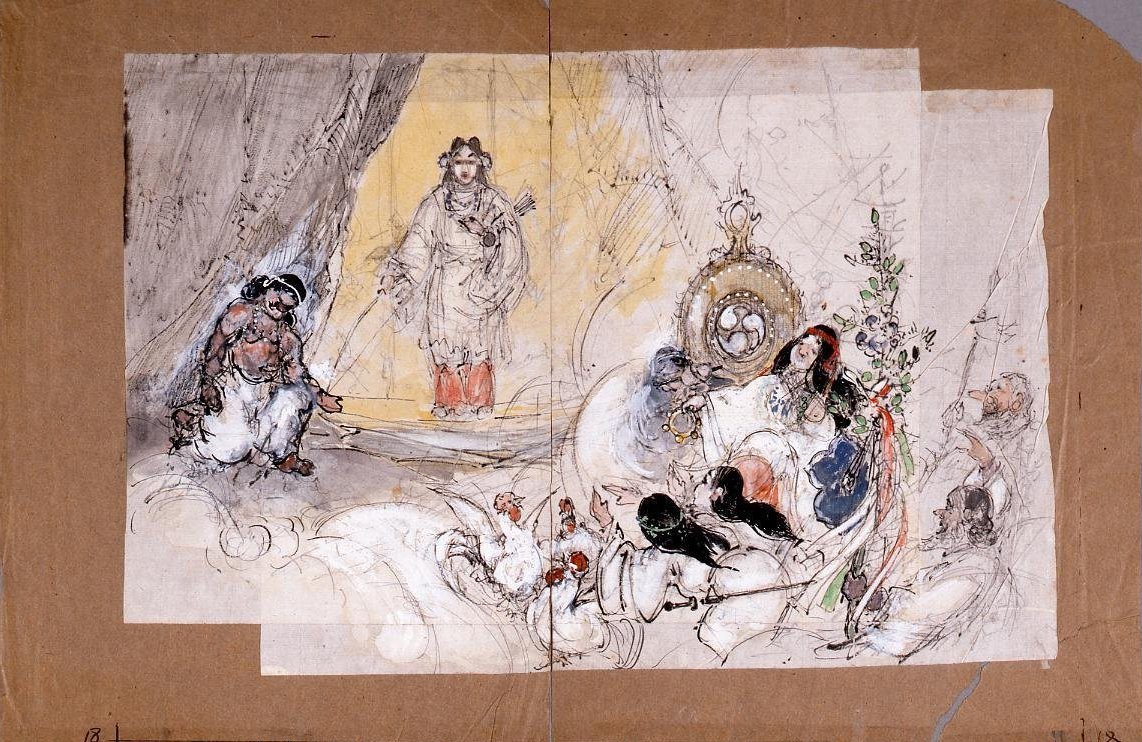
Ama-no-Iwato by Kawamura Kiyoo, Edo-Tokyo Museum

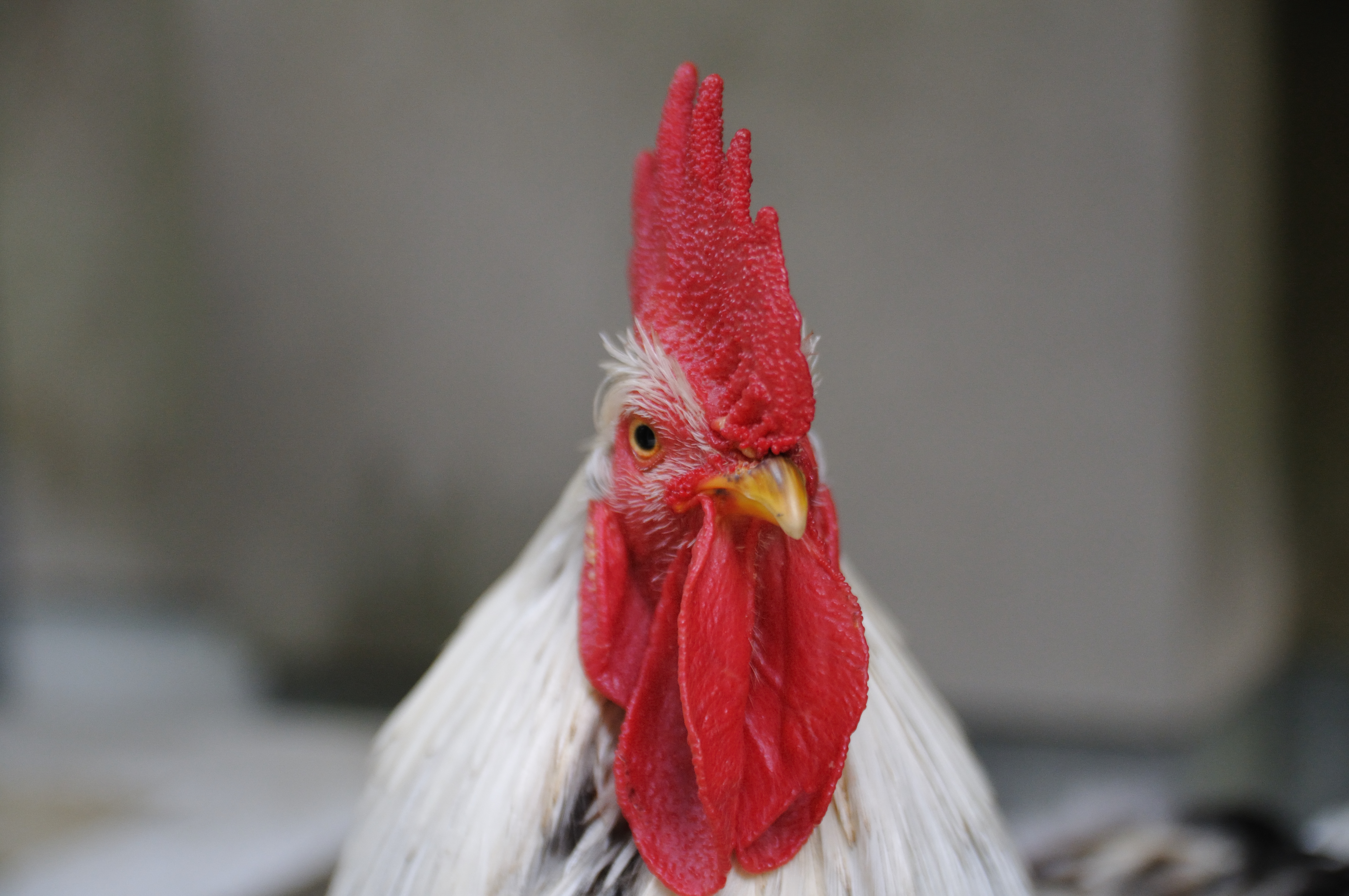
Rooster at Ise Jingū

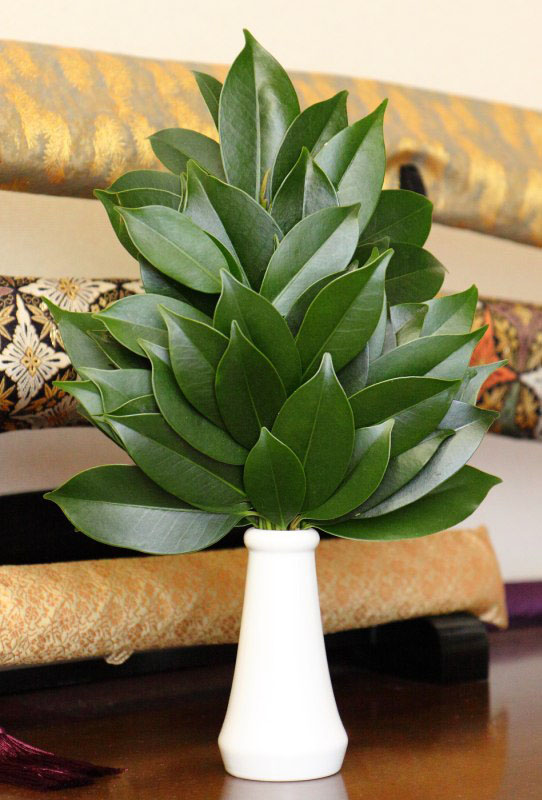
Sakaki (cleyera japonica)

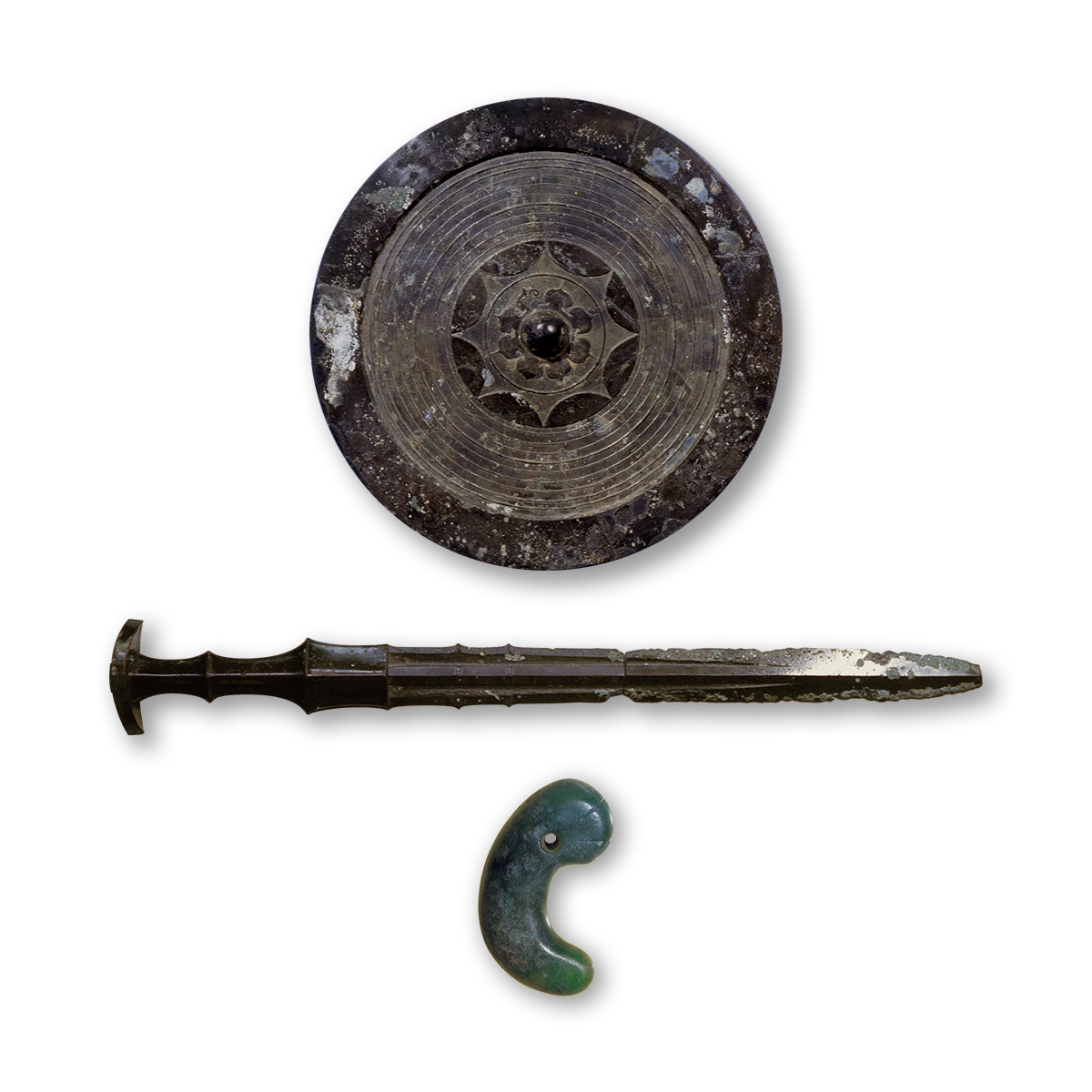
Imperial Regalia (reconstruction): sword, mirror, and magatama

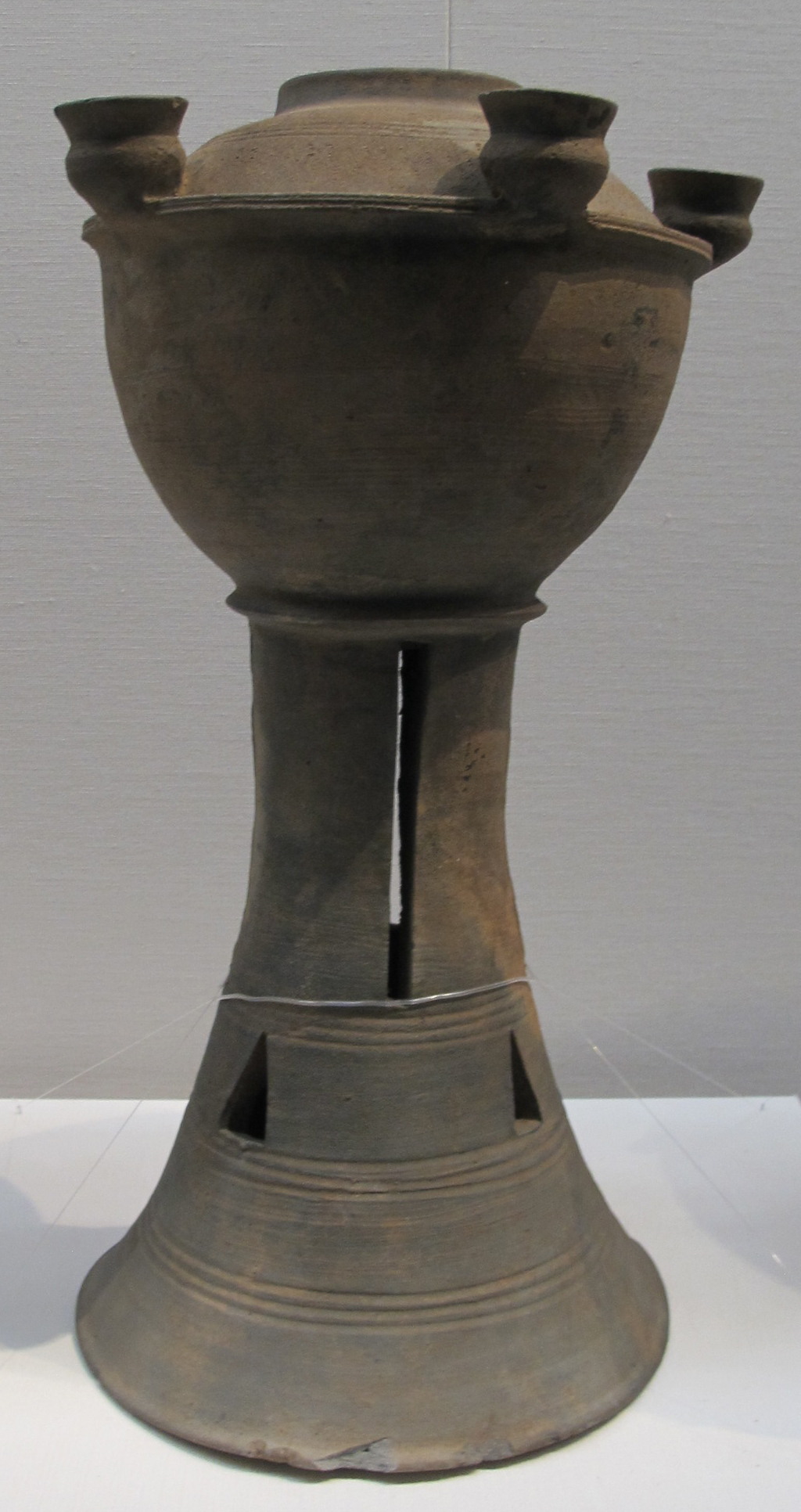
Footed Sue ware vessel, Tokyo National Museum

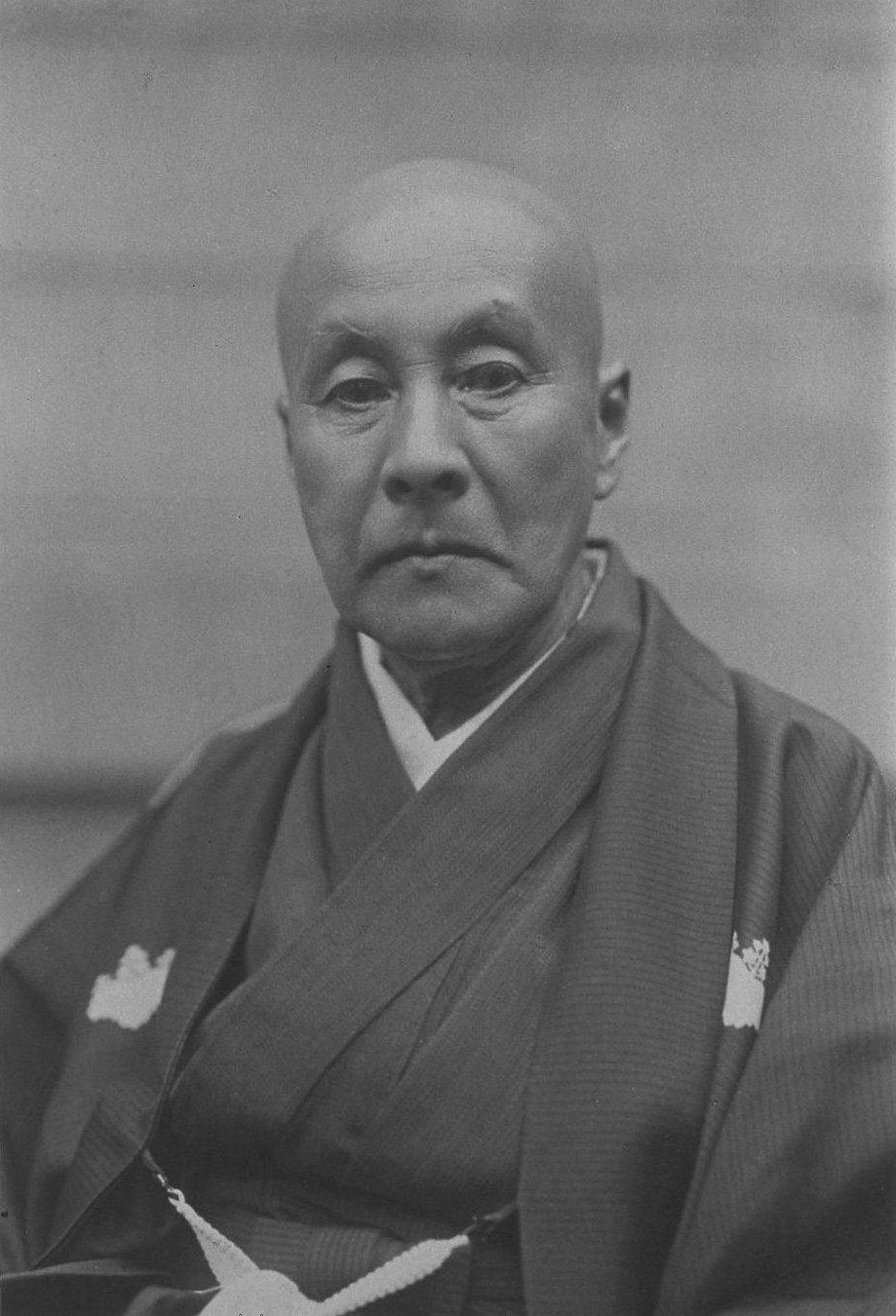
Kawamura Kiyoo in 1929

== See also ==
- Hinomaru
- Imperial regalia of Japan
- France-Japan relations
- Historical painting
- Amanoiwato Jinja
