= The Opening of the Modern Foreign and Sargent Galleries at the Tate Gallery =

Painting by John Lavery

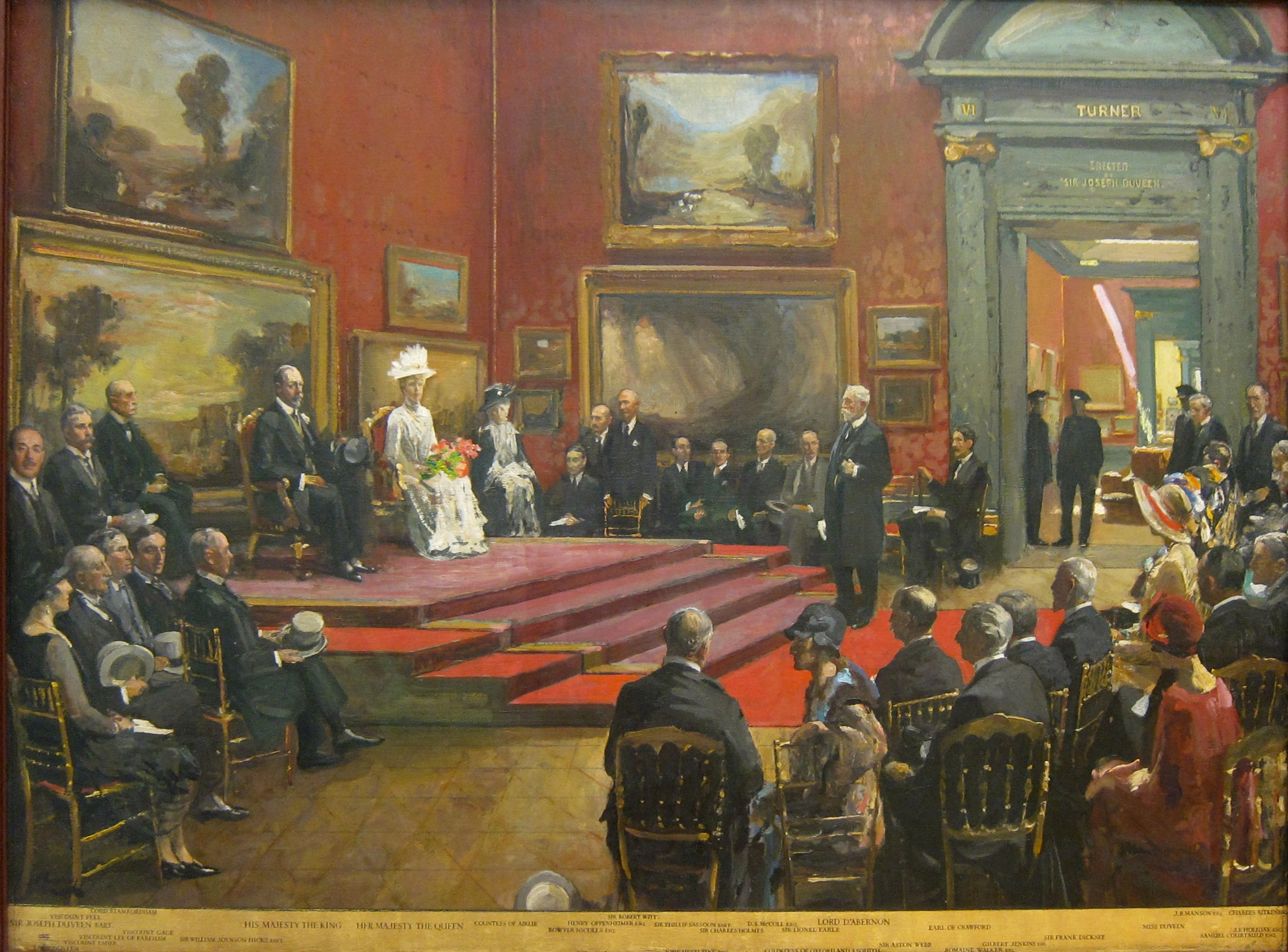
- Artist: John Lavery
- Year: 1929
- Type: Oil on canvas, history painting
- Dimensions: 85.7 cm × 116.8 cm (33.7 in × 46.0 in)
- Location: Tate Britain, London

The Opening of the Modern Foreign and Sargent Galleries at the Tate Gallery is a 1929 history painting by the Irish artist John Lavery. It depicts the ceremony on 26 June 1926 when George V, accompanied by his wife Mary of Teck, formally opened two new galleries at the Tate Gallery located in Pimlico on the banks of the River Thames. In a dramatic change of policy, these housed more Modernist painters such as Vincent Van Gogh. The painting actually shows the scene in the slightly older Turner Gallery, opened in 1910. The royal couple are shown seated on a dais listening to the Tate chairman, Lord D'Abernon, give his speech of welcome. Amongst the paintings shown hanging is Turner's Romantic history painting Hannibal and His Army Crossing the Alps.

Lavery was one of the Glasgow Boys and had developed a reputation for fashionable portraiture. The painting was commissioned by Joseph Duveen, who had funded the construction of the new galleries. Duveen is shown on the left of the painting beside the art collector Samuel Courtauld.

The picture was displayed at the Royal Academy Exhibition of 1929 held at Burlington House. The following year Duveen donated it to the Tate and it remains in the collection today.

== Bibliography ==
- McConkey, Kenneth. Sir John Lavery. Canongate Press, 1993.
- Taylor, Brandon. Art for the Nation: Exhibitions and the London Public, 1747-2001. Manchester University Press, 1999.
