= Arthur Diehl =

English painter

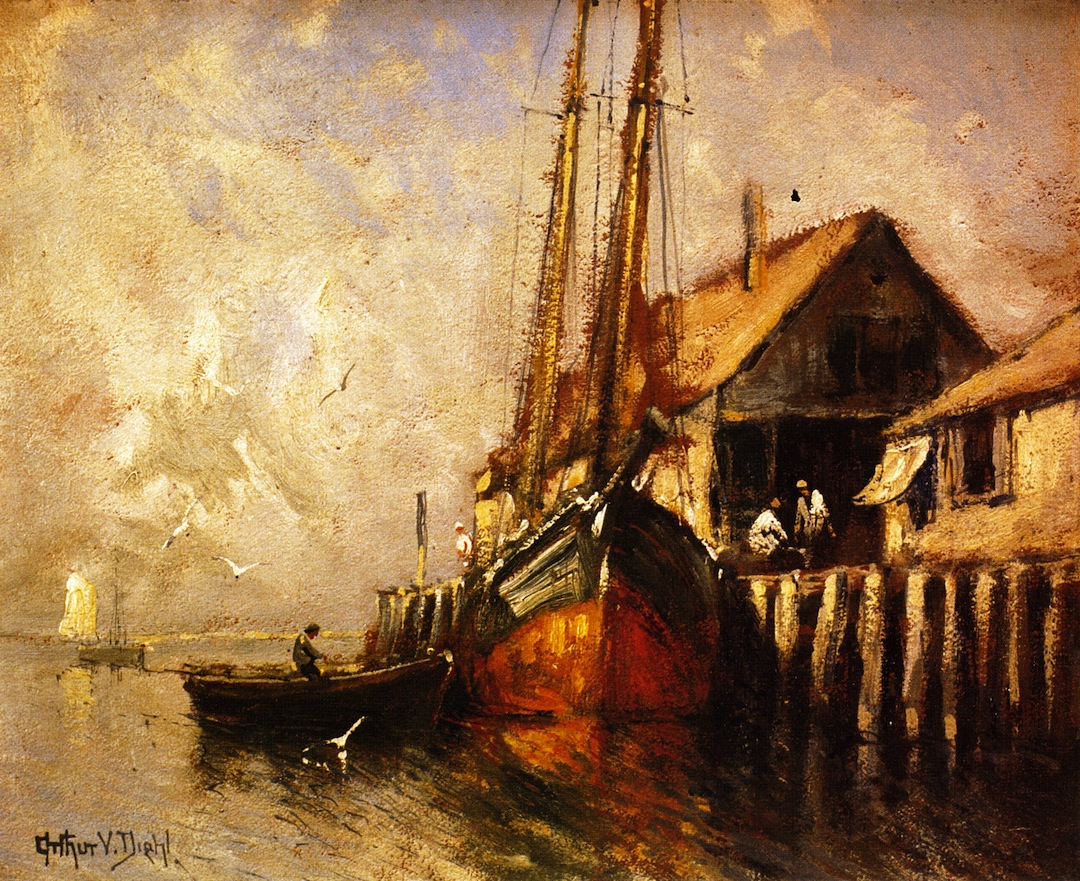
Provincetown, harbour

Arthur Vidal Diehl (1870 – 12 January 1929) was a prominent English impressionist landscape artist.

Diehl was born in London, England, but for most of his career, he lived in Provincetown, Massachusetts, United States where he painted Old World and New World landscapes. Diehl's Old World subjects include scenes from Italy, Morocco, England, and the Netherlands. His subjects in the United States include Cape Cod, Boston, St. Augustine, Florida, and New York City.
