= Takahashi Yuichi =

Japanese painter

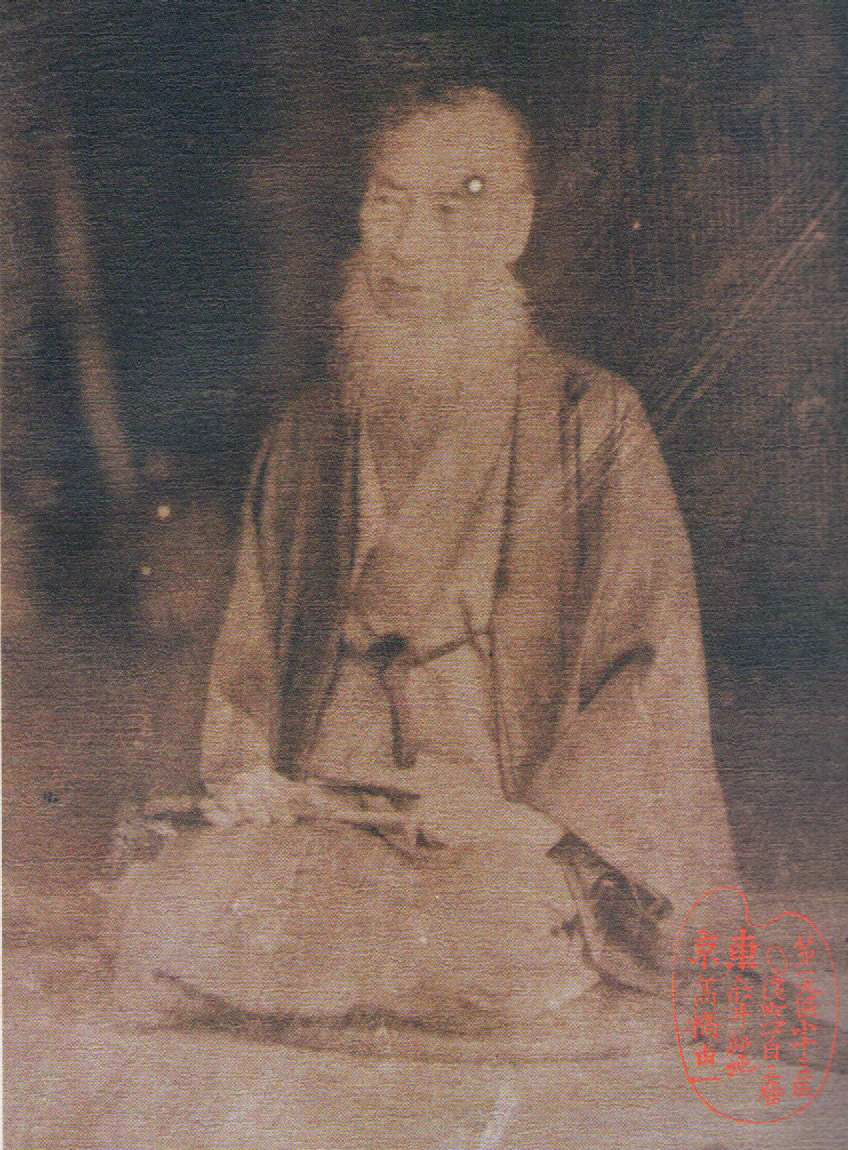
- Takahashi Yuichi
- Born: March 20, 1826; Edo Japan
- Died: July 6, 1894 (aged 68); Tokyo, Japan
- Known for: Painter,
- Movement: Yōga

Takahashi Yuichi (高橋 由一; The childhood name is Inosuke, and later Yunosuke. (March 20, 1828 – July 6, 1894) was a Japanese painter, noted for his pioneering work in developing the yōga (Western-style) art movement in late 19th-century Japanese painting.There were many Japanese painters who tried Western painting and Western style painting in the modern age, but Yuichi is said to be the first "Western painter" in Japan who learned full-scale oil painting techniques and was active from the late Edo period to the middle of the Meiji era.

== Biography ==
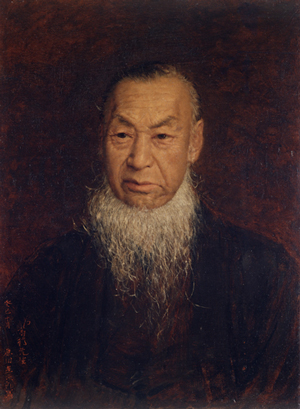
Portrait by Harada Naojirō

Takahashi was born to a samurai-class household at the Edo residence of Sano Domain, a subsidiary han of Sakura Domain, where his father was a retainer of the Hotta clan. Interested in art from childhood, he apprenticed to the Kanō school, but later became fascinated with western-style art through lithographs which were being available in Japan during the Bakumatsu period. In 1862, he obtained a place in the arts department of the Bansho Shirabesho, the Tokugawa shogunate's research institute in western learning, where he studied under Kawakami Togai, and where he began experimentation with oil painting. In 1866, he went to Yokohama to study under the English artist and cartoonist Charles Wirgman, who was so impressed with his talent that he sponsored his participation in the Paris World Exhibition of 1867.

After the Meiji Restoration, despite his largely self-taught credentials, he was appointed a professor of art at the Kobubijutsu Gakkō (the Technical Fine Arts School) by the new Meiji government, and was a student and an assistant for the Italian foreign advisor Antonio Fontanesi, who had been hired by the Meiji government in the late 1870s to introduce western oil painting to Japan.

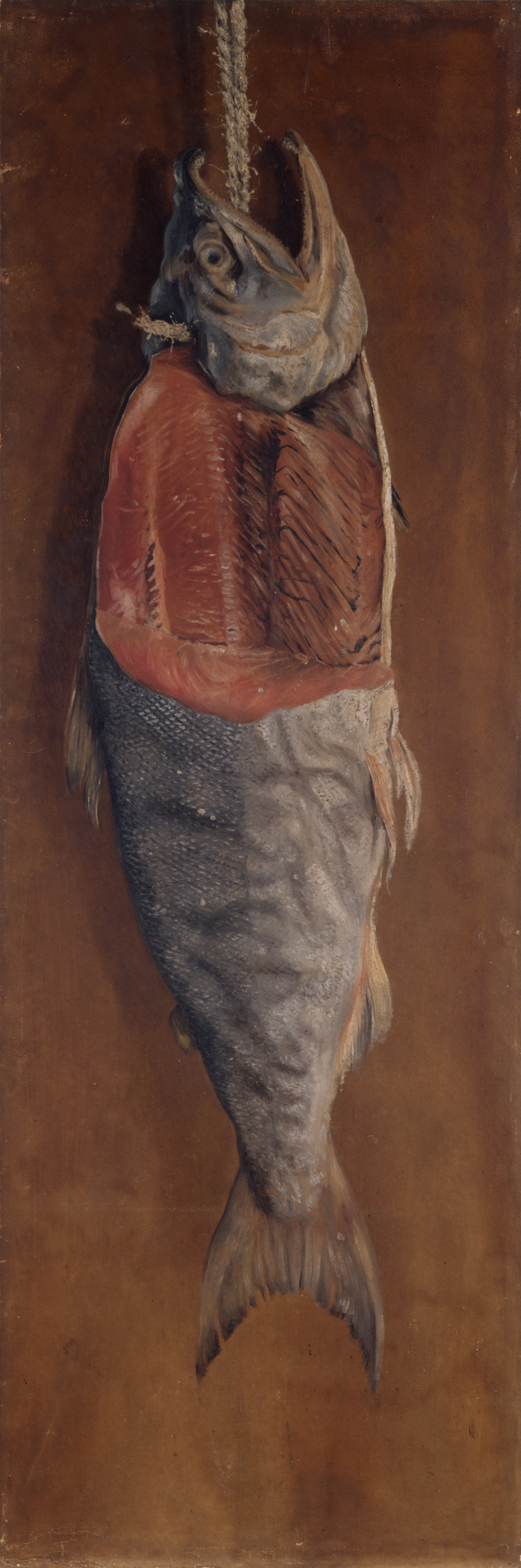
Salmon, oil painting, 1877 (Tokyo University of the Arts)

In 1879, he entered a contest sponsored by the Kotohira-gū shrine in Shikoku for ceiling panel paintings, donating all of the paintings to the shrine after the contest. The shrine still displays a collection of 27 of his paintings. Also in 1879, Takahashi was recommended by the Genrōin to become a court painter, and was commissioned to paint a portrait of the emperor. In 1881, he received a large commission from Viscount Mishima Michitsune to paint scenes of public works projects in Yamagata prefecture.

Takahashi produced mostly portraiture and landscape paintings, but also still life works. His best-known painting is a salmon hung up to dry, which has been recognized by the Agency for Cultural Affairs of the Japanese government as an Important Cultural Property of Japan. He died at home in 1897.

== Noted works ==
- Beauty(Courtesan) (美人(花魁), bijin(Oiran)), 1872, Tokyo University of the Arts, National Important Cultural Property
- Salmon (鮭, sake), 1877, Tokyo University of the Arts, National Important Cultural Property
