= Lise with a Parasol =

Painting by Pierre-Auguste Renoir in the Museum Folkwang

- Artist: Pierre-Auguste Renoir
- Year: 1867
- Medium: oil on canvas
- Dimensions: 184 cm × 115.5 cm (72 in × 45.5 in)
- Location: Museum Folkwang, Essen, Germany

Lise with a Parasol (French: Lise – La femme à l'ombrelle) is an oil on canvas painting by French artist Pierre-Auguste Renoir, created in 1867 during his early Salon period. The full-length painting depicts model Lise Tréhot posing in a forest. She wears a white muslin dress and holds a black lace parasol to shade her from the sunlight, which filters down through the leaves, contrasting her face in the shadow and her body in the light, highlighting her dress rather than her face.

After having several paintings rejected by the Salon, Renoir's Lise with a Parasol was finally accepted and exhibited in May 1868. The painting was one of Renoir's first critically successful works during his early Salon period, an accomplishment which would only be surpassed more than a decade later with Madame Georges Charpentier and Her Children (1878) at the Salon of 1879. In the late 1860s, Renoir's technique was still influenced by Gustave Courbet, but he continued to develop his unique style painting filtered light which he would return to in The Swing (1876) and Dance at Le Moulin de la Galette (1876).

The almost life-size portrait and unusual contrast in Lise with a Parasol led several critics to ridicule the work. Théodore Duret, a passionate supporter of the nascent Impressionists, bought the painting from Renoir, who was unable to sell it. Karl Ernst Osthaus, a German patron of avant-garde art, acquired Lise with a Parasol in 1901 for the Museum Folkwang.

== Background ==
Pierre-Auguste Renoir (1841–1919) grew up in Paris, where his father worked as a tailor and his mother as a seamstress. Renoir trained as a porcelain painter for four years in his youth, but the Industrial Revolution was well underway and technological innovation in porcelain manufacturing replaced porcelain painters with machines, leaving Renoir without a career. (Note: Edward Alden Jewell: "It is amusing to note that if it had not been for the unhappy invention of machine printing on porcelain, Renoir would have remained a decorator of china vases to the end of his days.") He soon found work as a decorative commercial artist during the day, painting fans for ladies, church banners for overseas missionaries, and ornamental blinds. Renoir's early decorative and artisanal work gave him the ability to paint both with speed and skill. In addition to this work, Renoir learned to draw in the evenings and spent his free time studying paintings at the Louvre.

In November 1860, he entered the private studio of Charles Gleyre (1806–1874) and was later admitted to the École des Beaux-Arts in April 1861. In Gleyre's studio, Renoir became friends with fellow students Claude Monet (1840–1926), Alfred Sisley (1839–1899), and Frédéric Bazille (1841–1870). During the summer of 1862, Renoir and his friends painted landscapes in the Forest of Fontainebleau, following in the tradition of the Barbizon school before them. (Note: See the history of rail transport in France. "In 1849 the extension of the railway to the departmental capital of nearby Melun brought hoards of visitors to the forest. A contemporary guide book complains that the once virgin forest was now criss-crossed with countless paths laid out for bourgeois visitors; as one mid-century writer put it: 'everyone today knows Fontainebleau. For the Parisians, above all, the railway has turned it into a suburb.'") It was in the forest where Renoir first met Narcisse Virgilio Díaz (1807–1876), who, according to popular anecdote, saved Renoir from a vicious beating by using his cane to beat away attackers who were making fun of Renoir's porcelain smock. Renoir and Díaz had shared interests; they both got their start as decorators of porcelain before turning to painting. Díaz helped mentor Renoir, gave him access to art supplies, and influenced and changed his style, discouraging Renoir's overuse of bitumen and leading him to lighten his palette. Art critic Jean Bouret writes: "Diaz, still wearing his old porcelain decorator's smock (like Troyon and Dupré), happened to meet Renoir in a clearing of the forest and recommended to him to use lighter tones, the very advice he himself had been given by Rousseau thirty years earlier. So a tradition was handed on, and henceforth, it would be the task of other 'sons of light' to bear the torch."

In his research on collaboration and friendship dynamics among the French Impressionists, sociologist Michael P. Farrell notes that the group learned together from their shared successes and failures. The successful application of new knowledge about color Renoir acquired from Díaz was quickly shared with his friends. Sisley was resistant at first, thinking it was "crazy" to paint colored light ("The idea of making trees blue and the ground purple!" (Note: As quoted in Farrell 2001, pp. 35–36. Regarding the novelty of painting colored light and the conservative backlash to the practice by the art world at the time, Duret writes: "Owing to their practice of always working face to face with nature, the Impressionists had learned to catch all its multitudinous aspects, and thus recorded on their canvases certain unsuspected effects. For instance they perceived that in winter sunshine the shadows thrown upon the snow appear to be blue, and they painted them blue accordingly. They had also discovered that in summer the light under the trees gives the ground a violet tinge, and therefore in painting woods they made the ground violet. Renoir in particular had painted a ball at Montmartre, Moulin de la galette, and a picture of a swing, Balançoire, in which the figures underneath sunlit trees are dappled with splashes of light, and the whole canvas is conceived in a general violet tone...The novelty of blue and violet shadows had produced a great outcry. Nobody seriously inquired whether in bright sunlight the shadows on the snow and under the trees might not actually possess the colors which the Impressionists had given them. The fact that such effects had never been seen in pictures before was sufficient to lead the conservative prejudices of the beholders to reject them with contempt.")) instead of the dark colors used in the classical style they were used to applying. But after playing around with the idea, Sisley soon embraced the new practice, and it was shared with Monet and Bazille. Renoir's exploratory use of color confirmed what Monet had previously learned from his mentor, Dutch painter Johan Jongkind (1819–1891), a forerunner of Impressionism. But with the success of these experiments also came failures, which were still influential. Monet's experiment with large format painting and his failure with Luncheon on the Grass (1865–1866) greatly influenced the close group of friends, with Monet's style helping to later inform Renoir's approach to Lise with a Parasol in 1867.

Renoir began submitting his work to the Salon in 1863. His first submission, Nymph and Faun, was rejected, leading Renoir to destroy his painting. The next year, Renoir tried again, submitting La Esméralda to the Salon of 1864. (Note: La Esméralda draws upon the character of Esméralda from Victor Hugo's 1831 novel The Hunchback of Notre-Dame.) Despite its acceptance, Renoir once again destroyed his painting. Two of Renoir's works, Portrait de William Sisley (1864) and Soirée d'été, were accepted by the Salon of 1865. Of all of Renoir's four early Salon submissions between 1863 and 1866, only one work survives (Portrait de William Sisley).

In that same year, Renoir met Lise Tréhot through his friend, former architect and painter Jules Le Cœur, who was involved in a relationship with Clémence, Lise's sister. Jules was featured in two of Renoir's works in 1866, Mother Anthony's Tavern and Jules Le Cœur in Fontainebleau Forest. From around 1865 to 1872, Lise modeled for Renoir and was his lover and companion during his early Salon period. Meanwhile, Renoir continued to face rejection at the Salon with Paysage avec deux figures (1866) and Diana (1867), two works featuring Lise as a model. Renoir's innovative work brought great ridicule and poverty, as he was unable to sell his paintings. He survived by devoting himself to painting portraits for wealthy patrons like the Le Cœur family. For about a decade, Renoir painted portraits and still lifes for the Le Cœurs and received a commission from Jules's brother Charles (Charles Le Cœur, 1874) to paint decorations on the ceiling for a town house he was designing for Romanian Prince George Bibescu. (Note: Prince George Bibescu was the son of Gheorghe Bibescu and Zoe Brâncoveanu (born Mavrocordatos).) Later, in 1874, the Le Cœurs ten year patronage came to an abrupt end when Renoir sent Charles's 16-year-old daughter Marie, (Portrait of Marie Le Cœur, 1870) a love letter, leading to Renoir's permanent ban from the Le Cœur residence. The Le Cœur family were the first collectors of Renoir's work and held on to his paintings until the 1920s. Art historian Douglas Cooper notes, "Like Lise, the Le Coeurs had given moral support and encouragement to Renoir during those bleak years when he was struggling, in the face of poverty and frustration, to overcome the difficulties of allowing his artistic personality and vision to develop. And like Lise, too, they disappear out of Renoir's ambiance just at the moment when his style first attains to maturity and shortly before he was to experience his first worldly successes."

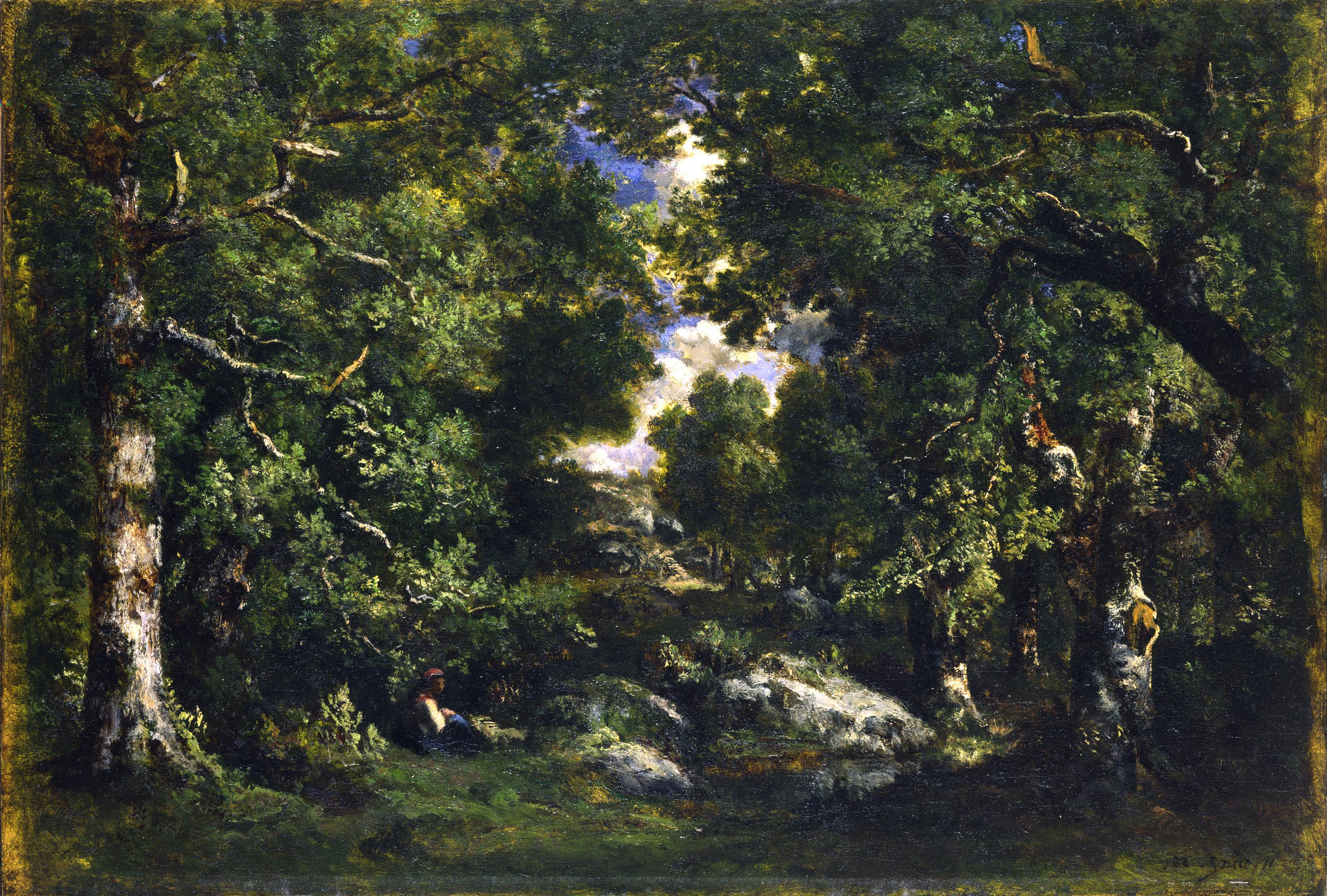
Forest of Fontainebleau (1858) by Narcisse Virgilio Díaz

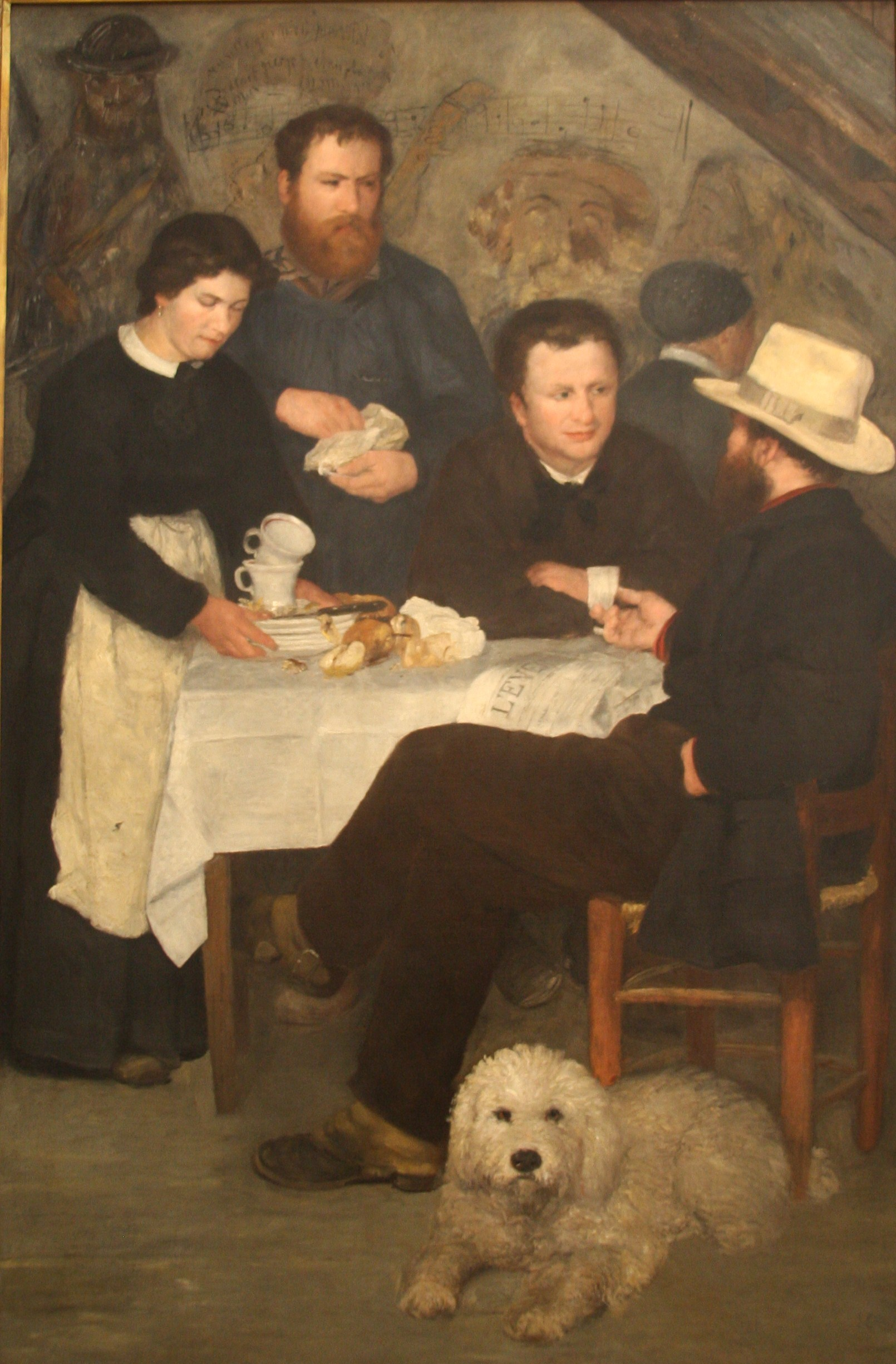
Mother Anthony's Tavern (1866)

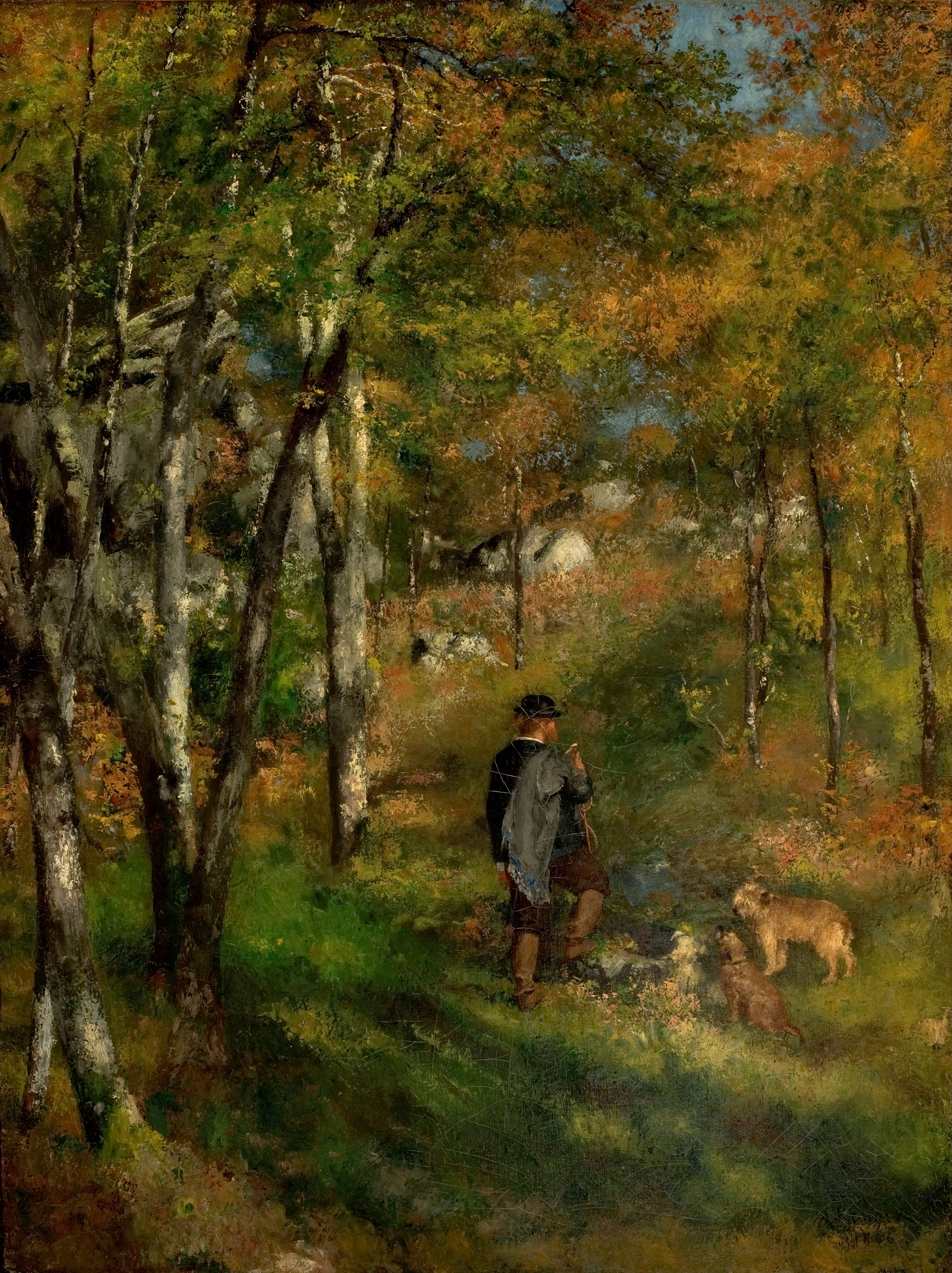
Jules Le Cœur in Fontainebleau Forest (1866)

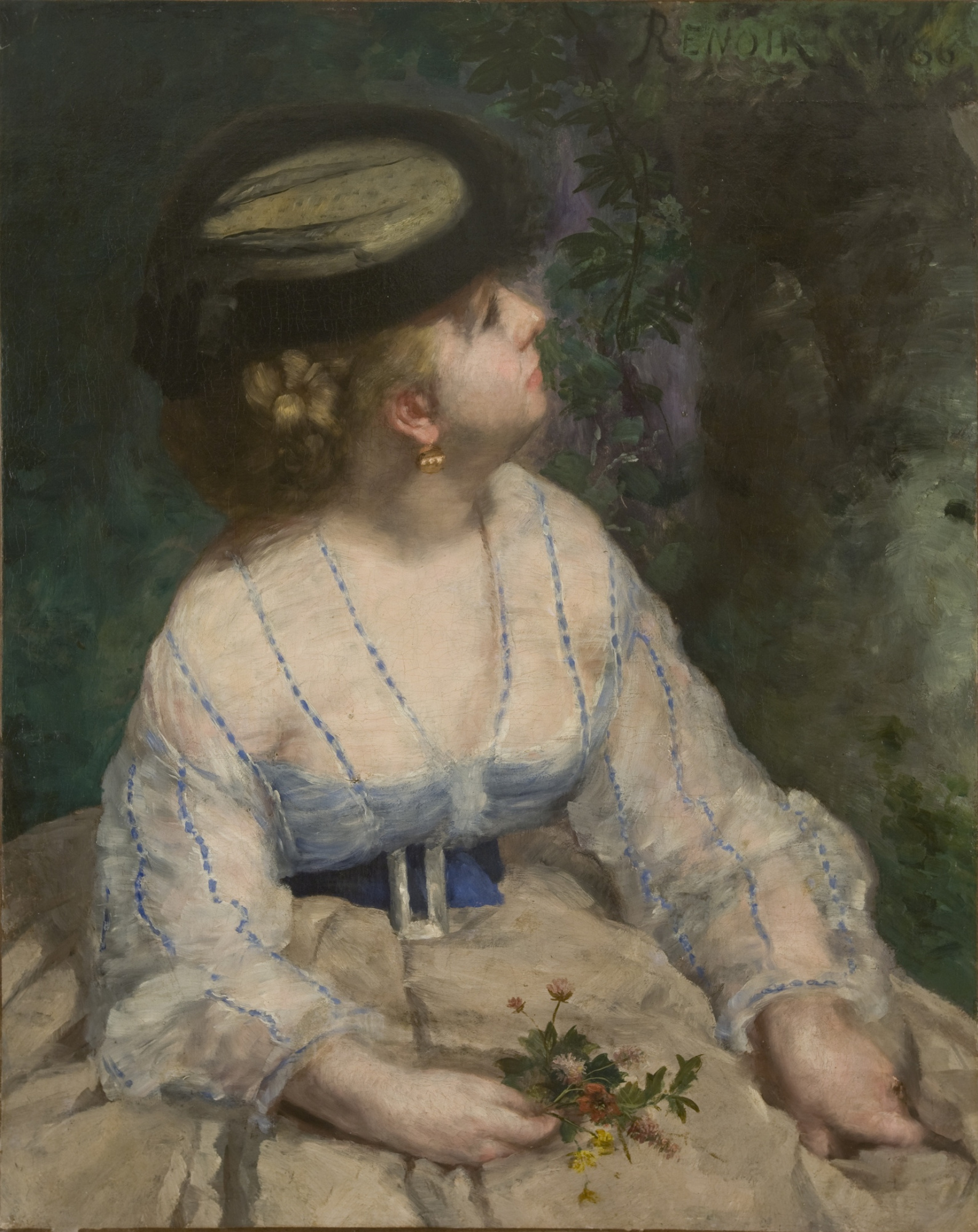
Woman with Bird (1866). The extant remaining portion of Paysage avec deux figures featuring Lise

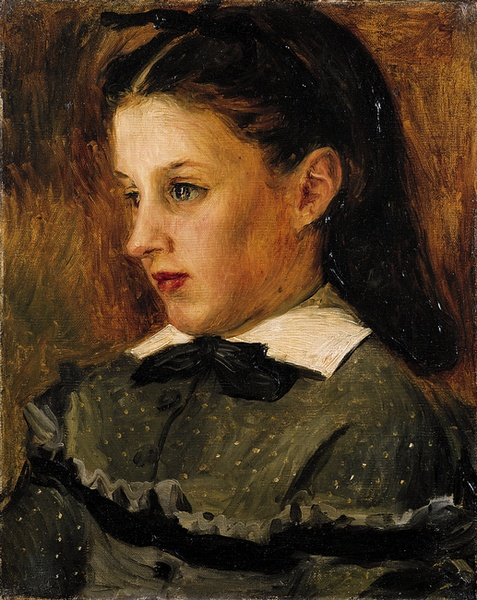
Portrait of Marie Le Cœur (1870)

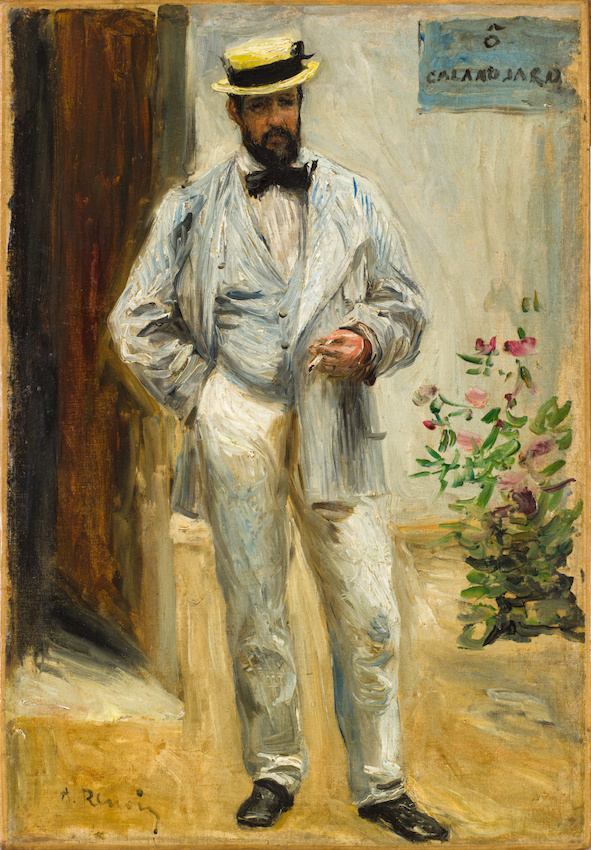
Charles Le Cœur (1872)

== Development ==
Renoir sold himself as a figure painter during the early Salon period from 1863 to 1873, where he created large-scale works featuring figures in the outdoors, with only one landscape (Soirée d'été) submitted to the Salon during that entire time. Before the Impressionists held their first exhibitions in the 1870s, conventional academic art ranked landscape painting lower than history, portraiture, and genre painting. "Despite his attachment to Le Cœur and Marlotte, and to Monet and Sisley", writes art historian Colin B. Bailey, "landscape painting was a secondary endeavor for him." Oddly enough, Renoir's refusal to identify himself as a landscapist to conform to the academic art demands of the day may have worked against his efforts to sell his paintings, as art dealers like Paul Durand-Ruel were looking to buy landscapes, not figure paintings. Due to his financial difficulties and his parents' small apartment that had seven adults living in just three rooms, Renoir spent these early years living with his wealthy artist friends Frédéric Bazille (1841–1870), Le Cœur, Edmond Maître (1840–1898), and Sisley who also helped him find commissions. By July 1866, Renoir was living with Bazille at 20 rue Visconti on the Left Bank, and stayed there until December 1867.

He began painting Lise with a Parasol in the summer of 1867, possibly in August, when he was 26 years old. Previously, it was assumed that Renoir had composed the painting in the Fontainebleau forest, close to Chailly-en-Brie near Bourron-Marlotte, just like he had done with Mother Anthony's Tavern (1866). More recent scholarship points to Renoir painting the work in the Chantilly Forest of Chantilly, Oise, for two months, from July to August. (Note: There is some debate about where the painting was made. Douglas Cooper argues that the painting was probably completed in Chantilly, not Fontainebleau as commonly assumed according to Vollard.) During this time, Maître sent a message to Bazille about how Renoir's technique had changed, writing on August 23, 1867, that although Renoir was now in Chantilly, Maître saw him in Paris earlier in the year where Renoir was "painting strange canvases, having traded turpentine for an infamous sulfate and using, instead of a knife, the little syringe that you know." It is unknown if Renoir completed the painting of Lise with a Parasol in the studio or en plein air in the forest. "Even if Renoir largely worked on the painting in the studio", writes art historian Gary Tinterow, "we do not know enough about his practice in the 1860s". In spite of that, Renoir "presented his subjects as plein air painting".

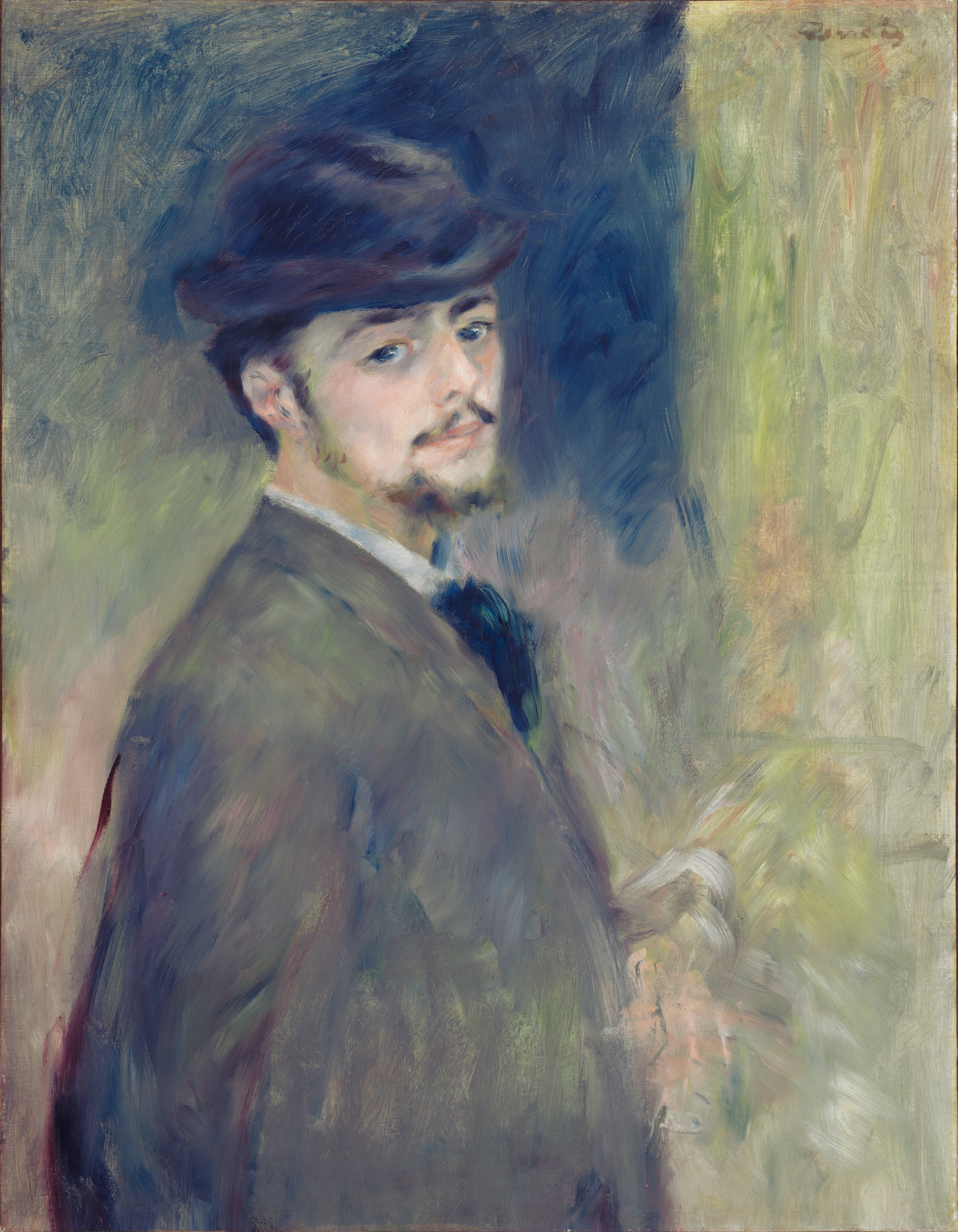
Self-portrait (1876), age 35.

== Exhibition ==
Renoir submitted the work to the Salon of 1868 with the short and simple title of "Lise". The painting was accepted by the Salon and received positive feedback. (Note: The social and economic importance of the Salon as an institution accepting Renoir's work is best explained by Gérard Monnier: "The Salon in the nineteenth century was [...] the place where the artist established his relationship with power—administrative power, academic power and economic power. Stemming from its status as a shop-window, demonstrative of the realities operating elsewhere, the Salon was transformed into a place of confrontation and competition, a place of sales, a place determining the extent of the social existence of the artist." Sylvie Patry: "The Salon was a crucial milestone in an artist's career. Having work accepted and being seen and noticed was absolutely critical for an artist.") It was Renoir's first critically successful work at the Salon, only later surpassed with the greater success of Madame Georges Charpentier and Her Children (1878) at the Salon of 1879. However, in spite of this achievement, "the jury had stigmatized Renoir as a rebel, along with Courbet, Manet, and Monet", according to Tinterow. The attention Renoir garnered with Lise led the administrators of the Salon to move Lise, along with paintings by Bazille and Monet, to a remote gallery known as the "rubbish dump" (dépotoir). When Renoir's work was exhibited by the Salon early in his career, it was often skied, a process where his paintings were deliberately hung in areas such as high places and corners where it was difficult for the public to view and would receive the least attention. Art historian Jane M. Roos notes that "relegating works to the dépotoir was a favorite tactic of the administration, a 'humiliation' in Castagnary's words and a sure sign that a painting had displeased the establishment or, perhaps, pleased the public too much."

== Description ==
Lise with a Parasol is a large format, almost life-size portrait painting of a young woman in full-length, standing on the edge of a forest clearing with the shade of a grove of oak trees composing the background. The woman stands in full frontal pose exposed to the full light of the summer sun while her face is partly obscured, turned to the left in three-quarter profile, shadowed by her parasol. She wears a small, pork pie straw hat with red ribbons, and a long white muslin dress with a long black sash; the dress is modestly buttoned to the neck and has long sheer sleeves. Lise carries a black lace parasol to shade her head while her body is in strong sunlight, standing on a patch of grass. The initials of "A" (Auguste) and "L" (Lise) are marked as an arborglyph on the trunk of the tree in the shade behind her.

== Style and themes ==
Art historian John House notes that the work "explore[s] the borderlines between portraiture and genre painting". Renoir's decision to name the painting using only the first name of his model indicates, according to House, that this is not a traditional portrait painting, as such works typically used family names or initials. By using Lise's first name as the title, House argues that Renoir was pointing to her status as a mistress (or an unmarried female lover and companion). Renoir's presentation of Lise with a Parasol in the full-length, life-size format was, writes Peter H. Feist, a style typically reserved for royalty in the Western tradition.

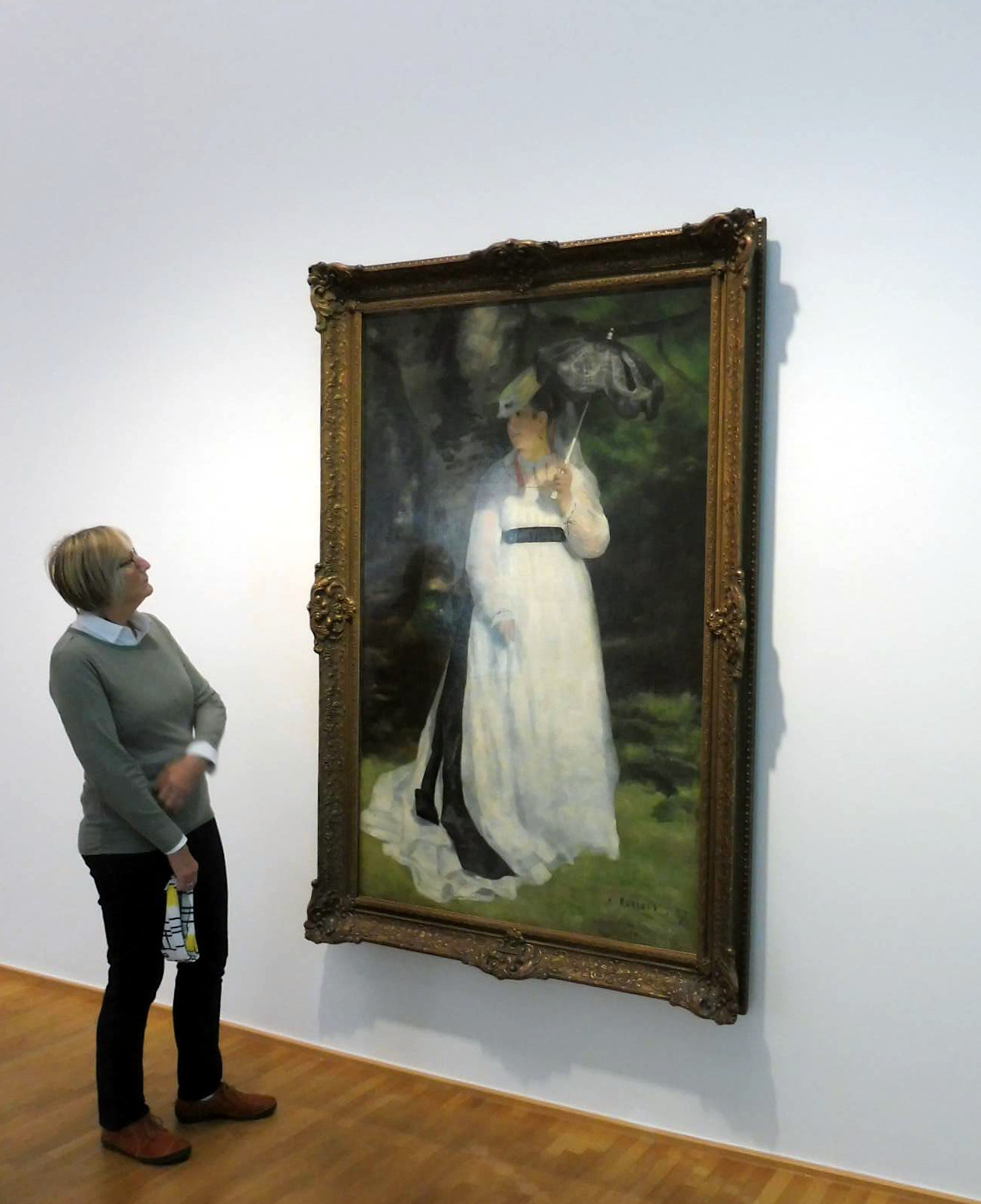
Visitor to scale. The large format is apparent.

Renoir's early use of the misty effect in his portrait of Lise with a Parasol would later be drawn upon by the artist in future works, writes art critic Charles Louis Borgmeyer. At least two later paintings featuring this mistiness, best exemplified by the figure of the man in La Loge (1874) and the figure of the ballerina in The Dancer (1874), were presented at the first exhibition of what would later be known as the Impressionists in April 1874. "What Claude Monet, Sisley, Guillaumin and Pissarro were doing with landscape", writes Borgmeyer, "Renoir did with figures. He adopted their pure color and bright tonality and under his brush the face, the flesh, even the accessories, took on exceptional radiance."

Historian Aileen Ribeiro notes Renoir's interest in fashion may have originated with family, as his father was a tailor and his mother was a dressmaker. (Note: Renoir came from a family of tailors and dressmakers. His father was a tailor, his mother was a dressmaker, and his brother Victor was a tailor who married a dressmaker. Renoir's elder sister Maria Elisa was also a dressmaker. She married fashion illustrator Charles Leray in 1864.) Renoir was interested in female fashion, and would often plan the outfits and accessories his models would wear in his paintings. Accounts from the time indicate that Renoir took a particular interest in female hats. According to Anne Distel, although Lise was a working class seamstress, her appearance in a "fine dress and umbrella suggests some holiday extravagance" in the context of the painting.

== Critical reception ==
In the late 1860s, Renoir was still in the process of developing his own unique style and technique. Critics noted that Lise with a Parasol, like several of Renoir's earlier paintings, Mother Anthony's Tavern (1866) and Diana (1867), showed the influence of other artists, notably French Realist painter Gustave Courbet. Art historians Lionello Venturi and Jean Leymarie both note the influence of Courbet, particularly from his work Young Ladies of the Village (1852). The model for the central figure in that painting is Courbet's sister Juliette, who appears in profile holding a parasol in a similar pose to Renoir's Lise. Critics evoked comparison with previous paintings and artists such as the image of the Symphony in White, No. 1: The White Girl (1861–62) by James Abbott McNeill Whistler, the image of Olympia (1863) by Édouard Manet, and the painting of Camille (1866) by Claude Monet.

Art critic Zacharie Astruc and writer Émile Zola both viewed Renoir's Lise with a Parasol as a continuation of Monet's Camille. Astruc, who was also Renoir's personal friend, described Lise as the "likeable Parisian girl in the woods", and viewed the painting as part of a trinity beginning with Manet's Olympia, followed by Camille and ending with Lise with a Parasol.

There was no major opposition to Lise with a Parasol at the Salon. Art critic Théophile Thoré, an early supporter of the Impressionists, praised the work. Thoré wrote: "The dress of white gauze is in full light, but with a slight greenish cast from the reflection of the foliage. The head and neck are held in a delicate half-shadow under the shade of the parasol. The effect is so natural and so true that one might very well find it false, because one is used to nature represented in conventional colors, but does not color depend on the environment which surrounds it?"

Tinterow attributes direct criticism of the painting to Renoir's decision to shadow Tréhot's face in darkness and emphasize the reflection of sunlight from her white dress. This unusual contrast was immediately noticed by critics who ridiculed Tréhot's appearance. In Le Salon Pour Rire, French caricaturist André Gill likened Tréhot in Lise with a Parasol to "a nice semisoft cheese out for a stroll", while Ferdinand de Lasteyrie described the painting as "the figure of a fat woman daubed with white".

Works

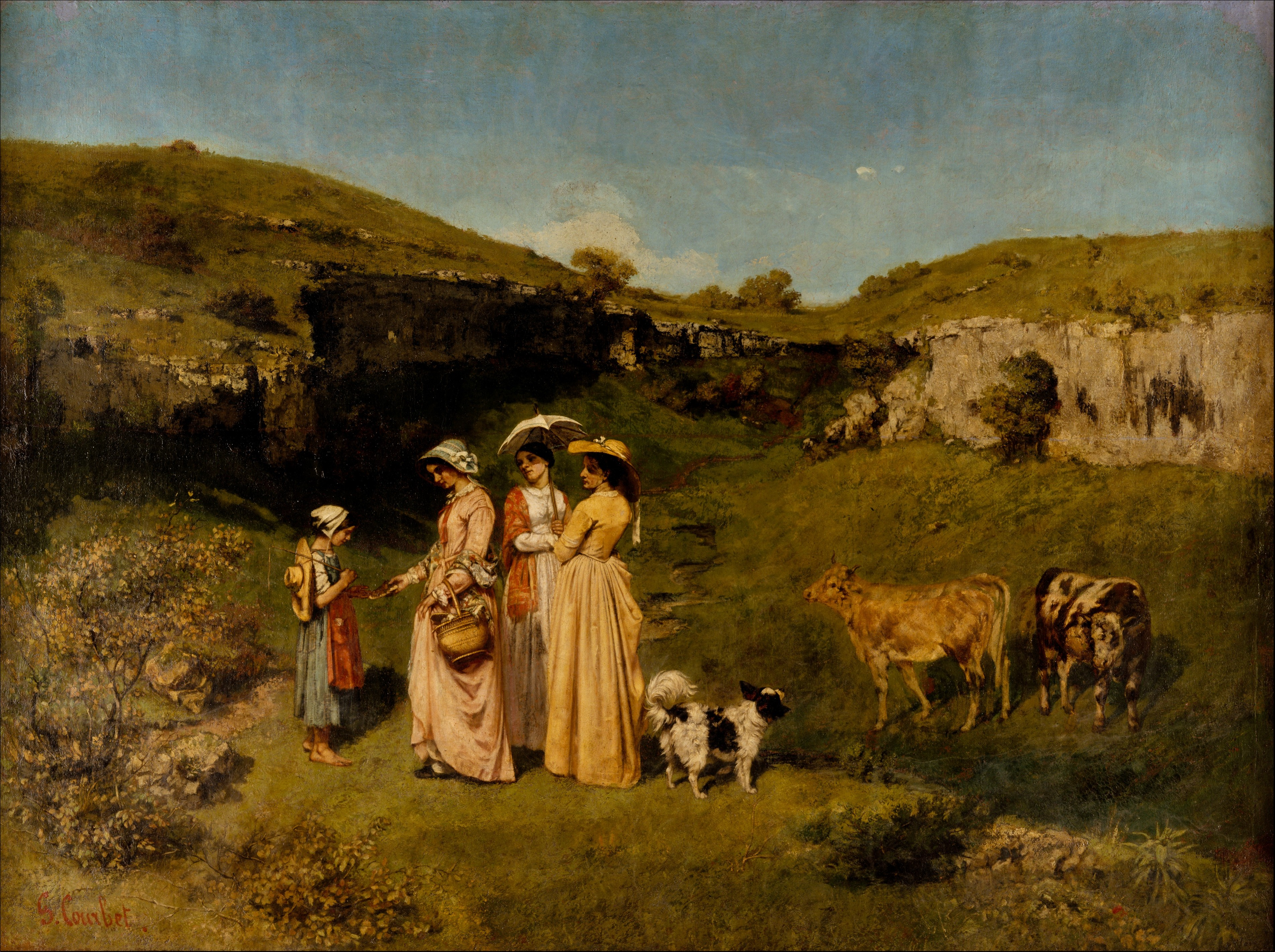
Young Ladies of the Village (1852) by Gustave Courbet

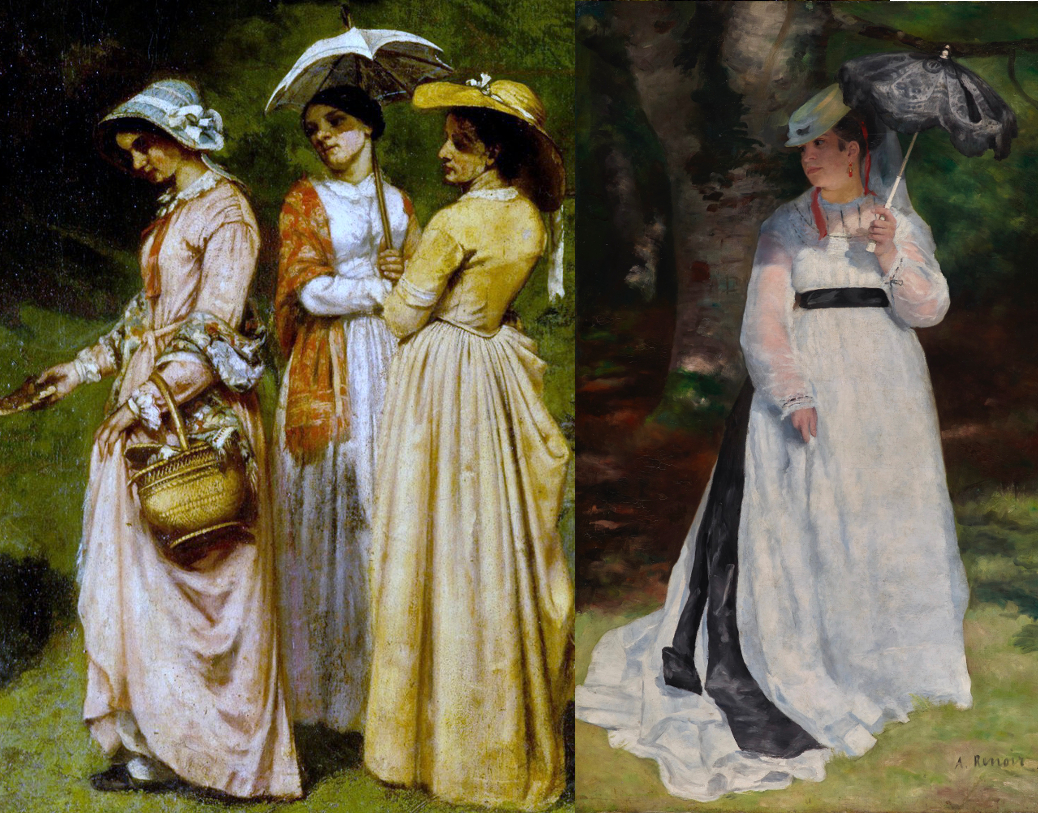
Comparison between the central figure of Young Ladies of the Village and Lise with a Parasol

Symphony in White, No. 1: The White Girl (1861–62) by James Abbott McNeill Whistler

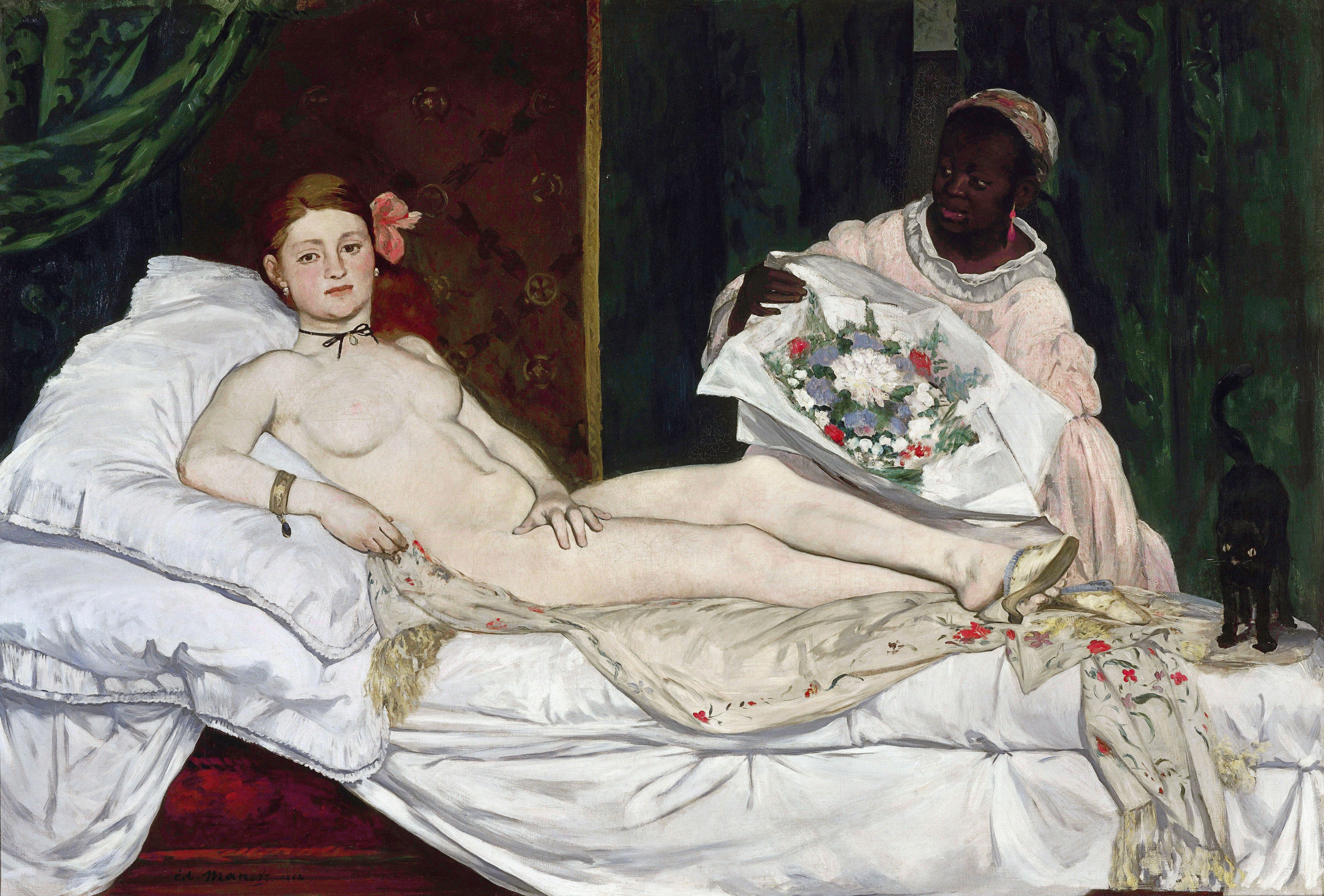
Olympia (1863) by Edouard Manet

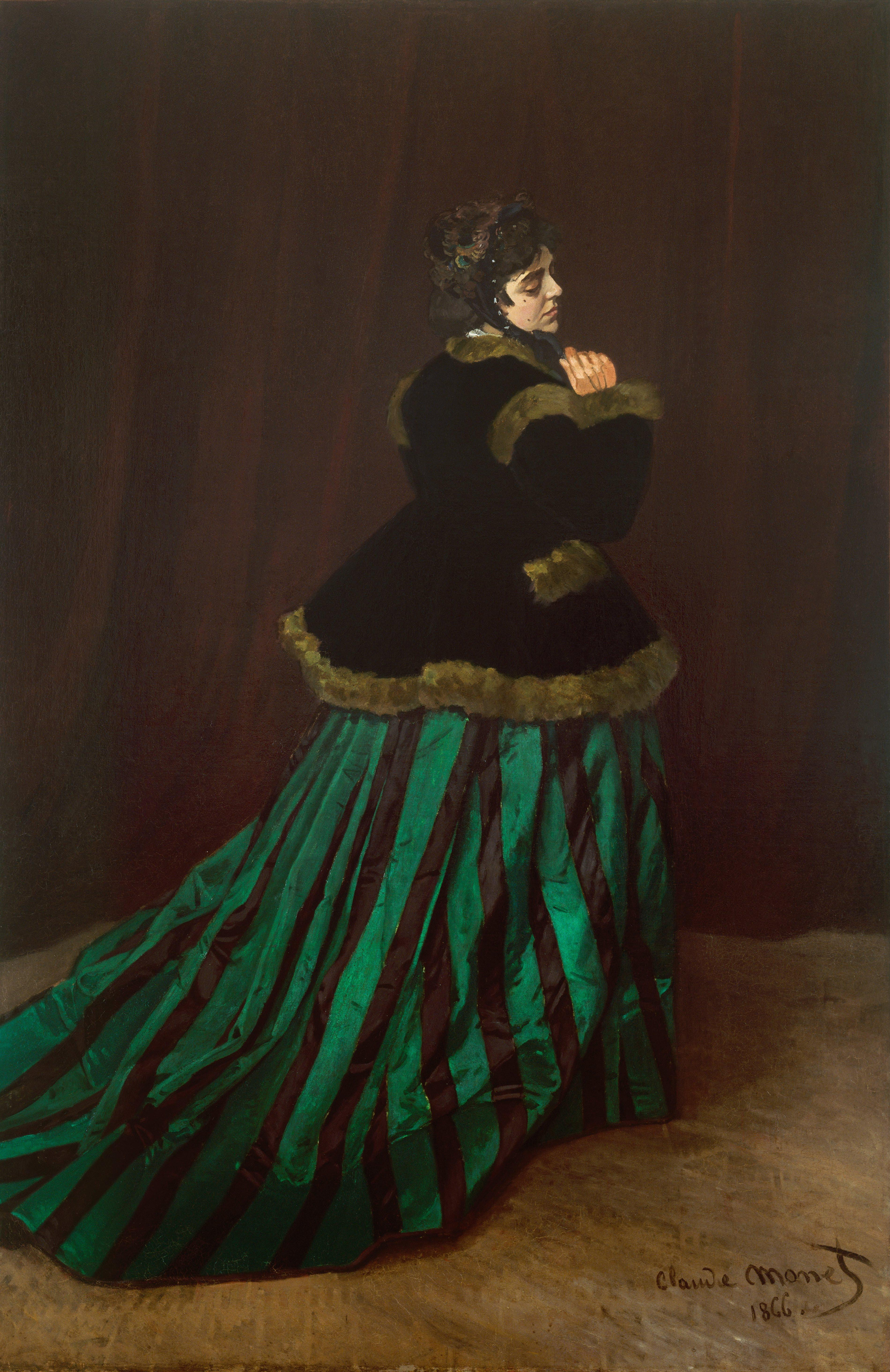
Camille (1866) by Claude Monet

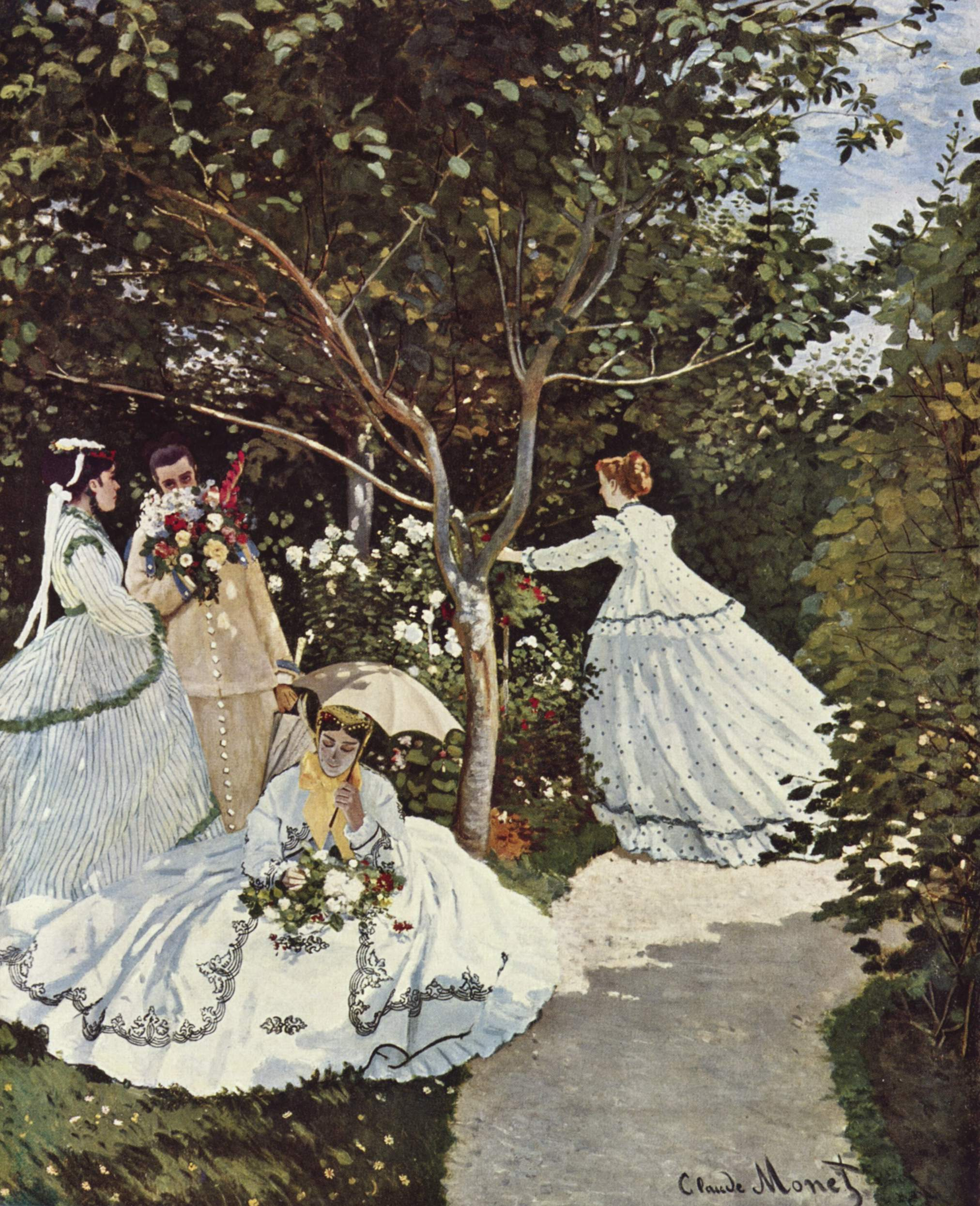
Women in the Garden (1866) by Claude Monet
Caricatures contemporaneous with the Salon of 1868

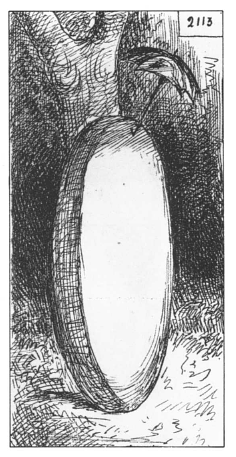
By André Gill

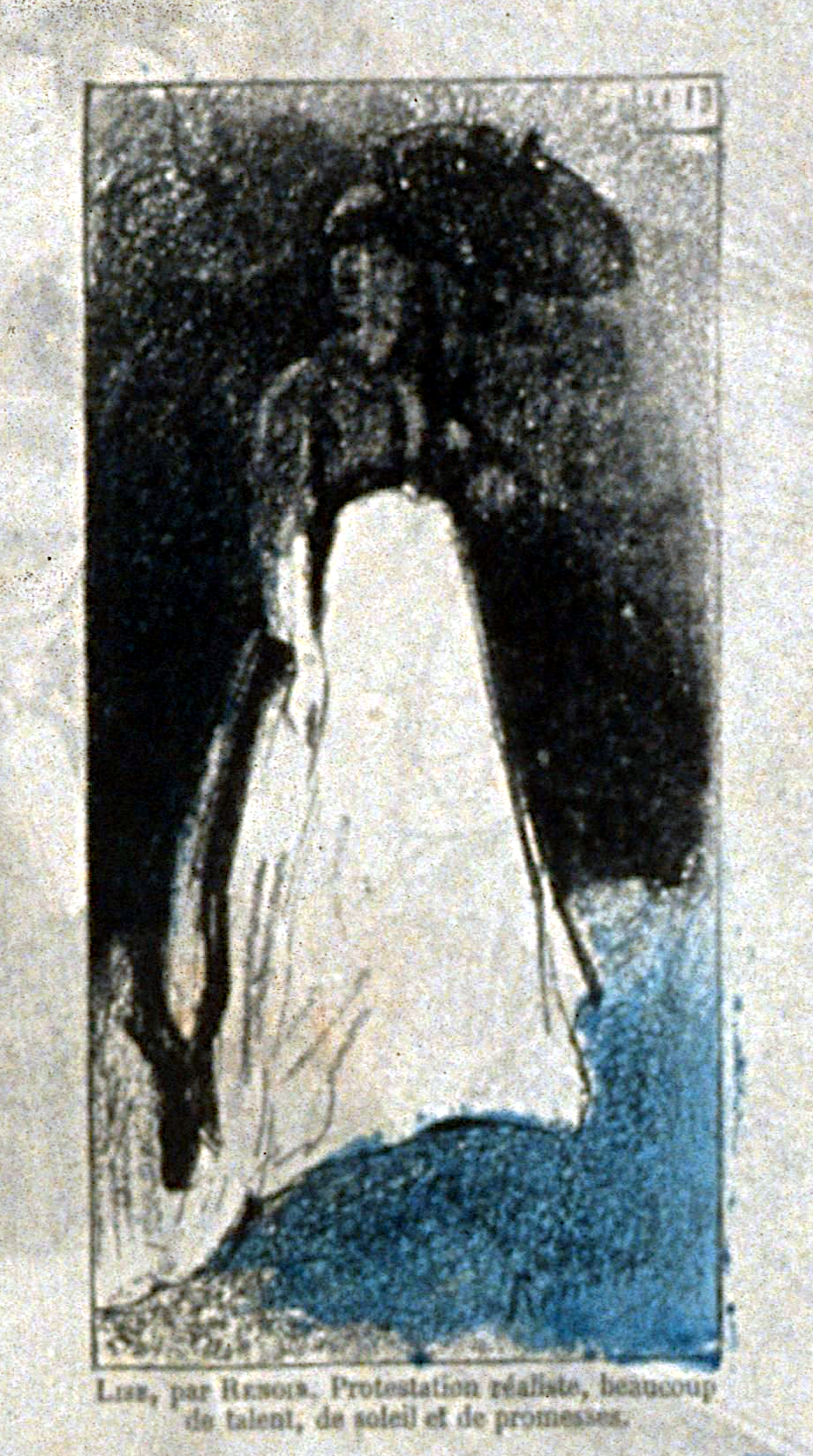
By Henri-Charles Oulevay

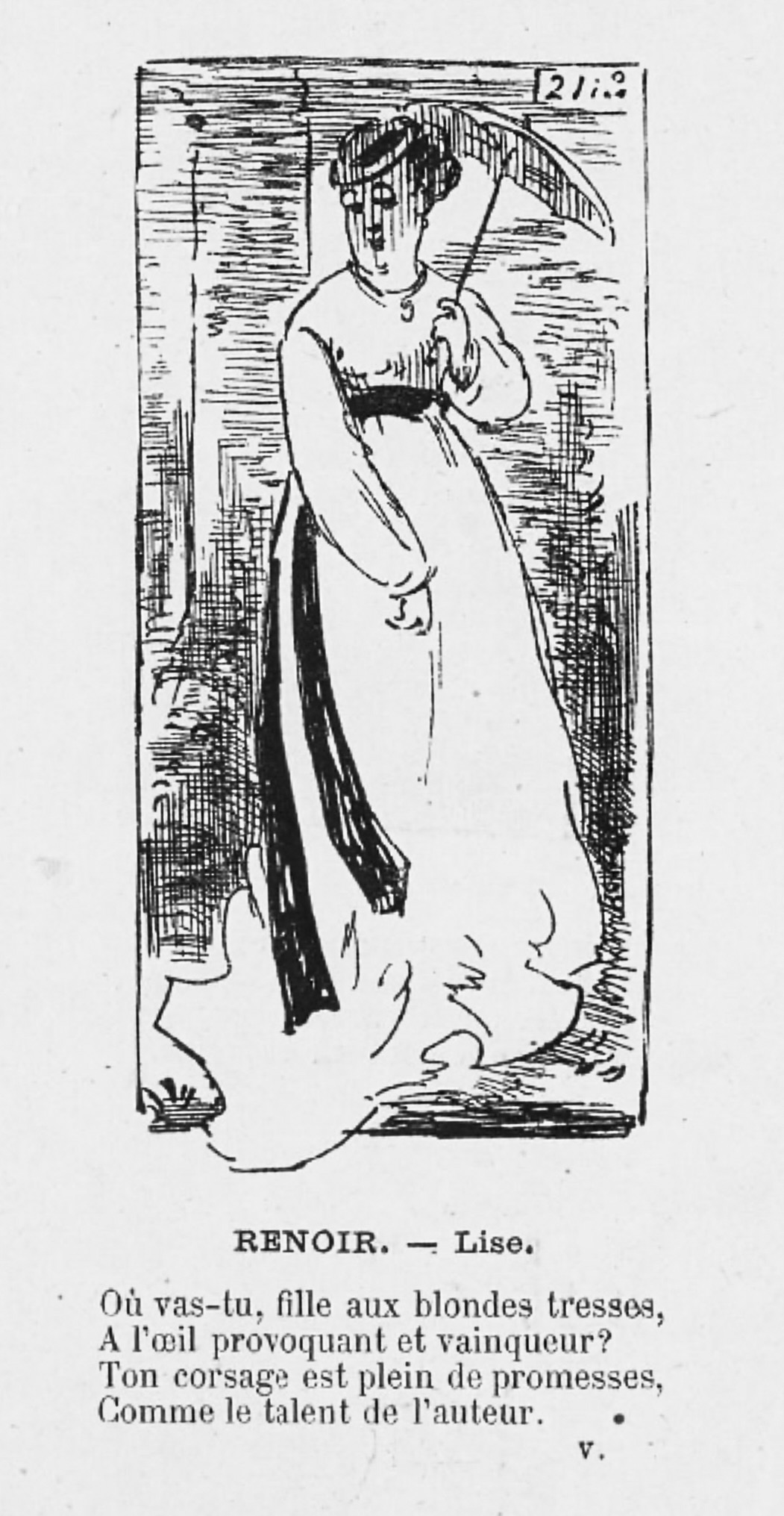
By Chassagnol, with a quatrain by Philippe Dubois (Vabontrain).

== Provenance ==
In a letter from Renoir to Frédéric Bazille in September 1869, Renoir writes about his desperation for money: "I exhibited [the portraits of] Lise and Sisley at Carpentier's. I am going to try to stick him for about 100 francs, and I'm going to put my woman in white up for auction. I'll sell it for whatever price it goes for; it's all the same to me." Renoir was unable to sell the painting.

In 1872, Théodore Duret (1834–1917), now known as "one of the earliest and most ardent defenders" of the Impressionists, met Renoir for the first time through Edgar Degas (1834–1917). At the time, Duret was not impressed by Renoir's Bohemian approach. However, Degas praised Renoir's work, which encouraged Duret to seek out his paintings in local galleries. In March 1873, Duret purchased Renoir's In Summer (1868) for 400 or 500 francs, possibly at an art gallery in Montmartre. Now interested in what Renoir had to offer, Duret went searching for the artist. Renoir told Duret that he was unable to pay rent for his studio and needed to quickly sell his paintings. Duret met with Renoir in his studio and chose to purchase Lise, the painting Duret liked most, on the spot for 1,200 francs. Before Duret purchased Lise, the canvas was sitting on the floor rolled up because Renoir was forced to sell the stretcher bar. "Nobody wanted the canvas", wrote German art critic Julius Meier-Graefe.

Duret later sold the painting to Paul Durand-Ruel in Paris on June 5, 1890; Durand-Ruel exhibited the painting in March 1901 in Hamburg, Germany, at a gallery owned by Berlin art dealer Paul Cassirer, a manager of the Berlin Secession who was promoting French paintings in Germany against the wishes of the Kaiser. Cassirer bought the painting several months later on May 10. Later that same month, on May 23, Karl Ernst Osthaus, a patron of the European avant-garde, paid 18,000 Goldmarks for Lise with a Parasol and brought it to his Folkwang Museum in Hagen, Germany. In a letter to his wife Gertrude, Osthaus writes, "The Renoir is so incredibly beautiful that I couldn't resist." The painting was moved to Essen when the museum relocated in 1922 as the Museum Folkwang.

== Related work ==
A sister painting, Portrait of Lise (Lise holding a bouquet of wild flowers) (1867), was completed around the same time as the larger Lise with a Parasol. In both works, she appears in a forest wearing a similar dress and the same earrings, but in Portrait of Lise she wears a blue rather than a black sash. House notes the thematic and narrative similarity between Lise with a Parasol and La Promenade (1870), as the expectations of the waiting woman in Lise with a Parasol are fulfilled in La Promenade, with the private, romantic rendezvous between lovers in the forest, a popular nineteenth century theme. A later painting, Woman with Parasol Seated in the Garden (1872), features Lise seated, modeling a similar dress with a red sash, hat, and parasol.

Lise with a Parasol was the first of Renoir's paintings to feature a human figure with light filtering through plant leaves from above. Later works by Renoir that make use of this same style include The Swing (1876) and Bal du moulin de la Galette (1876).

In May 1878, Théodore Duret published Les Peintres Impressionnistes, one of the first historical works about the Impressionist movement. For Duret's book, Renoir created a drawing of Lise with a Parasol, which Duret used as a frontispiece; it is the only image of a painting from the entire Impressionist movement in the book. In the section on Renoir, Duret speaks glowingly about Lise with a Parasol to help Renoir win commissions from future patrons. "Renoir excels in portraiture", writes Duret. "I doubt that any painter has ever depicted women in a more seductive way."

Year	Image	Title	Type	Dimensions	Gallery	Notes
1867		Portrait of Lise (Lise holding a bouquet of wild flowers)	Oil on canvas	156 cm × 129 cm	Private collection	The sister painting to Lise with a Parasol. Once owned by French haute couture fashion designer Jeanne Lanvin
1870		La Promenade	Oil on canvas	813 cm × 648 cm	Getty Center	The romantic rendezvous hinted at in Lise with a Parasol
1872		Woman with Parasol Seated in the Garden	Oil on canvas	46 cm × 37.9 cm	Private collection	Similar outfit to Lise with a Parasol
1878		Lise with a Parasol (drawing)				Drawing by Renoir used as a frontispiece by Duret in his 1878 book on Impressionism

== See also ==
- List of paintings by Pierre-Auguste Renoir

== Notes and references ==
Notes

== Bibliography ==
- Adams, Steven (1994). The Barbizon School & the Origins of Impressionism. Phaidon Press. ISBN 0-7148-2919-6. OCLC 34355336.
- Alexandre, Arsène (1892). Exposition A. Renoir: Galeries Durand-Ruel. Impr. de l'art, E. Ménard. OCLC 889838110.
- Bailey, Colin B. (2007). "'The Greatest Illuminosity, Colour, and Harmony': Renoir's Landscapes, 1862–1883". In Colin B. Bailey (ed.) Renoir landscapes: 1865–1883. National Gallery Company. pp. 50–81. ISBN 9781857093179. OCLC 72868889.
- Borgmeyer, Charles Louis (March 1913). "The Master Impressionists (Chapter IV)." Fine Arts Journal, 28 (3): 132–162. doi:10.2307/25587164.
- Bouret, Jean (1973)[1972]The Barbizon School and 19th Century French Landscape Painting. Thames and Hudson. New York Graphic Society. OCLC 949368.
- Portrait de Lise (Lise tenant un bouquet de fleurs des champs) . Christie's. June 24, 2008.
- Cooper, Douglas (May 1959a). "Renoir, Lise and the Le Cœur Family: A Study of Renoir's Early Development-1 Lise Archived 2019-03-02 at the Wayback Machine." The Burlington Magazine, 101 (674): 162–171. OCLC 53397979. (subscription required)
- Cooper, Douglas (Sept–Oct 1959b). "Renoir, Lise and the Le Cœur Family: A Study of Renoir's Early Development-II: The Le Cœurs." The Burlington Magazine, 101 (678/679): 320, 322–329. OCLC 53397979. (subscription required)
- De Grada, Raffaele (1989). Renoir. Trans. by Andrew Cannon and Jay Hyams. Arch Cape Press. ISBN 0-517-68372-5. OCLC 983886287.
- Denvir, Bernard (1990). The Thames and Hudson Encyclopaedia of Impressionism. Thames and Hudson. ISBN 9780500202395. OCLC 1334629510.
- Denvir, Bernard (1993). The Chronicle of Impressionism. Thames and Hudson. ISBN 9780500236659. OCLC 954795365.
- Distel, Anne (1990). Impressionism: The First Collectors. Trans. by Barbara Perroud-Benson. Harry N. Abrams. p. 53. ISBN 0-8109-3160-5. OCLC 20566765.
- Distel, Anne (1995). Renoir: A Sensuous Vision. "Abrams Discoveries" series. New York: Harry N. Abrams. ISBN 9780810928756. OCLC 34704757.
- Distel, Anne (2010). Renoir. Abbeville Press. pp. 23, 62–73. ISBN 978-0789210579. OCLC 435419243.
- Distel, Anne (March 7, 2012). "Renoir and the Woman of Paris". The Frick Collection. Retrieved May 1, 2023.
- Donahue, Nathaniel J. (September 2013). Decorative Modernity and Avant-Garde Classicism In Renoir’s Late Work, 1892–1919 (PhD thesis). New York University. OCLC 872612917. Retrieved August 2, 2023.
- Duret, Théodore (1878). Les peintres impressionistes: Claude Monet-Sisley- C. Pissarro-Renoir-Berthe Morisot. Librairie Parisienne. OCLC 1333449543.
- Duret, Théodore (1902). Histoire d'Edouard Manet et de son oeuvre. H. Floury. OCLC 768310014.
- Duret, Théodore (1910). Manet and the French Impressionists. Trans. by J. E. Crawford Flitch. G. Richards. OCLC 744658.
- Eitner, Lorenz (1992). An Outline of 19th Century European Painting: From David through Cézanne. Volume I. Harper & Row. ISBN 0-06-432976-3. OCLC 49225406.
- Feist, Peter H. (1987). Pierre-Auguste Renoir 1841–1919: A Dream of Harmony. Taschen. ISBN 9783822800652. OCLC 19524758.
- Farrell, Michael P. (2001). Collaborative Circles: Friendship Dynamics and Creative Work. University of Chicago Press. ISBN 9780226238661. OCLC 472808666.
- Groom, Gloria (2012). Impressionism, Fashion, & Modernity. The Art Institute of Chicago. ISBN 9780300184518. OCLC 816976764. pp. 37, 51, 75, 94, 96–97, 284, 305.
- Hansen, Dorothee (2015). "Durand Ruel and German". In Patry, Sylvie (ed.). Inventing Impressionism: Paul Durand-Ruel and the Modern Art Market. National Gallery. Yale University Press.ISBN 9781857095845. pp. 152–170.
- House, John (1997). Pierre-Auguste Renoir: La Promenade Archived 2015-07-03 at the Wayback Machine. Getty Publications. pp. 17, 55, 57. ISBN 9780892363650. OCLC 37109128.
- House, John (2007). "The Public Face of Renoir as a Landscapist". In Colin B. Bailey (ed.) Renoir landscapes: 1865–1883. National Gallery Company. pp. 10–17. ISBN 9781857093179. OCLC 72868889.
- House, John. (2013). "The Many Faces of Lise Tréhot: Pierre-Auguste Renoir's Portraits of Parisiennes Archived 2022-02-17 at the Wayback Machine." In Heather MacDonald (ed.) Impressionism and Post-Impressionism at the Dallas Museum of Art. The Richard R. Brettell Lecture Series. Yale University Press. ISBN 978-0-300-18757-1. OCLC 844731572.
- Jewell, Edward Alden (1944). French Impressionists and their Contemporaries Represented in American Collections. The Hyperion Press. OCLC 1216969.
- Kingsley, Rose Georgina (1899). A History of French Art, 1100–1899. Longmans, Green and Company. OCLC 192135341.
- Leymarie, Jean (1955). Impressionism: Biographical and Critical Study. Trans. by James Emmons. Volume I. OCLC 592843.
- Loyrette, Henri (1994a). "Portraits and Figures". Origins of Impressionism Archived 2016-06-03 at the Wayback Machine. Metropolitan Museum of Art. pp. 183–232. ISBN 9780870997174. OCLC 30623473
- Loyrette, Henri (1994b). "History Painting". Origins of Impressionism Archived 2016-06-03 at the Wayback Machine. Metropolitan Museum of Art. pp. 29–54. ISBN 9780870997174. OCLC 30623473
- Lucy, Martha. John House (2012). Renoir in the Barnes Foundation. Yale University Press. pp. 1–2, 69. ISBN 9780300151008. OCLC 742017633.
- Maloon, Terence (2005). Camille Pissarro. Art Gallery of New South Wales. Yale University Press. ISBN 9780300115529. OCLC 68187386.
- Meier-Graefe, Julius (1920). Auguste Renoir. (in German) R. Piper. p. 10–14, 110. OCLC 697606917.
- Museum Folkwang – Collection Online Archived 2022-02-17 at the Wayback Machine. Essen. "Acquired in 1901 for the Museum Folkwang, Hagen, since 1922 Essen". Retrieved September 15, 2022.
- Parent, Thomas (2000). Das Ruhrgebiet: vom "goldenen" Mittelalter zur Industriekultur. DuMont Reiseverlag. ISBN 9783770131594. OCLC 237374514.
- Patry, Sylvie (March 24, 2022). "In search of Lise, Renoir's model and muse Archived 2022-09-20 at the Wayback Machine". Jubiläumsvortragsreihe 1922/2022. (Jubilee Lecture Series 1922/2022). Museum Folkwang. Retrieved April 11, 2023.
- Ribeiro, Aileen (March 28, 2012). "Renoir and the Democracy of Fashion". The Frick Collection. Alex Gordon Lecture in the History of Art.
- Roos, Jane Mayo (1996). Early impressionism and the French state (1866–1874). Cambridge University Press. ISBN 9780521552448. OCLC 185335700.
- Schneider, Bruno F. (1958) Renoir. Trans. by Desmond and Camille Clayton. Crown Publishers. OCLC 1154531114.
- Strieter, Terry W. (1999). Nineteenth-century European Art: A Topical Dictionary. Greenwood Press. ISBN 978-0-313-29898-1. OCLC 185705650.
- Tinterow, Gary (1994a). "Figures in a Landscape". Origins of Impressionism Archived 2016-06-03 at the Wayback Machine. Metropolitan Museum of Art. pp. 125–148. ISBN 9780870997174. OCLC 30623473
- Tinterow, Gary. Henri Loyrette (1994b). Origins of Impressionism Archived 2016-06-03 at the Wayback Machine. Metropolitan Museum of Art. pp. 410, 454. ISBN 9780870997174. OCLC 30623473.
- Tinterow, Gary; Geneviève Lacambre (2003). Manet/Velázquez: The French Taste for Spanish Painting. Metropolitan Museum of Art. ISBN 9781588390400. OCLC 216911741.
- Turner, Jane (2000). The Grove Dictionary of Art: From Renaissance to Impressionism: Styles and Movements in Western Art 1400–1900. Macmillan. p. 163. ISBN 9780312229757. OCLC 43076942
- Venturi, Lionello (1950). Impressionists and Symbolists: Manet, Degas, Monet, Pissarro, Sisley, Renoir, Cezanne, Seurat, Gauguin, Van Gogh, Toulouse-Lautrec. Trans. by Francis Steegmuller. Scribner. ISBN 9780815404590. OCLC 1305096.
- Vollard, Ambroise (1925). Renoir: An Intimate Record. Trans. by Harold L. Van Doren and Randolph T. Weaver. Alfred A. Knopf. ISBN 9780486264882. OCLC 23082906.
- White, Barbara Ehrlich (2010). Renoir: His Life, Art, and Letters. Abrams. ISBN 9780810996076. OCLC 503442731.
- White, Barbara Ehrlich (2017). Renoir: An Intimate Biography. Thames & Hudson. ISBN 9780500774038. OCLC 1012226709.
- Whitmore, Janet (Spring 2014). "Review: Impressionism, Fashion, and Modernity Archived 2016-05-21 at the Wayback Machine." Nineteenth-Century Art Worldwide, 13(1): 338–359. ISSN 1543-1002.
- Wintle, Justin (2009). "Renoir, Pierre-Auguste". The Concise New Makers of Modern Culture. Routledge. ISBN 9781134021390. OCLC 228374446.
