= In Summer (Renoir) =

Painting by Auguste Renoir

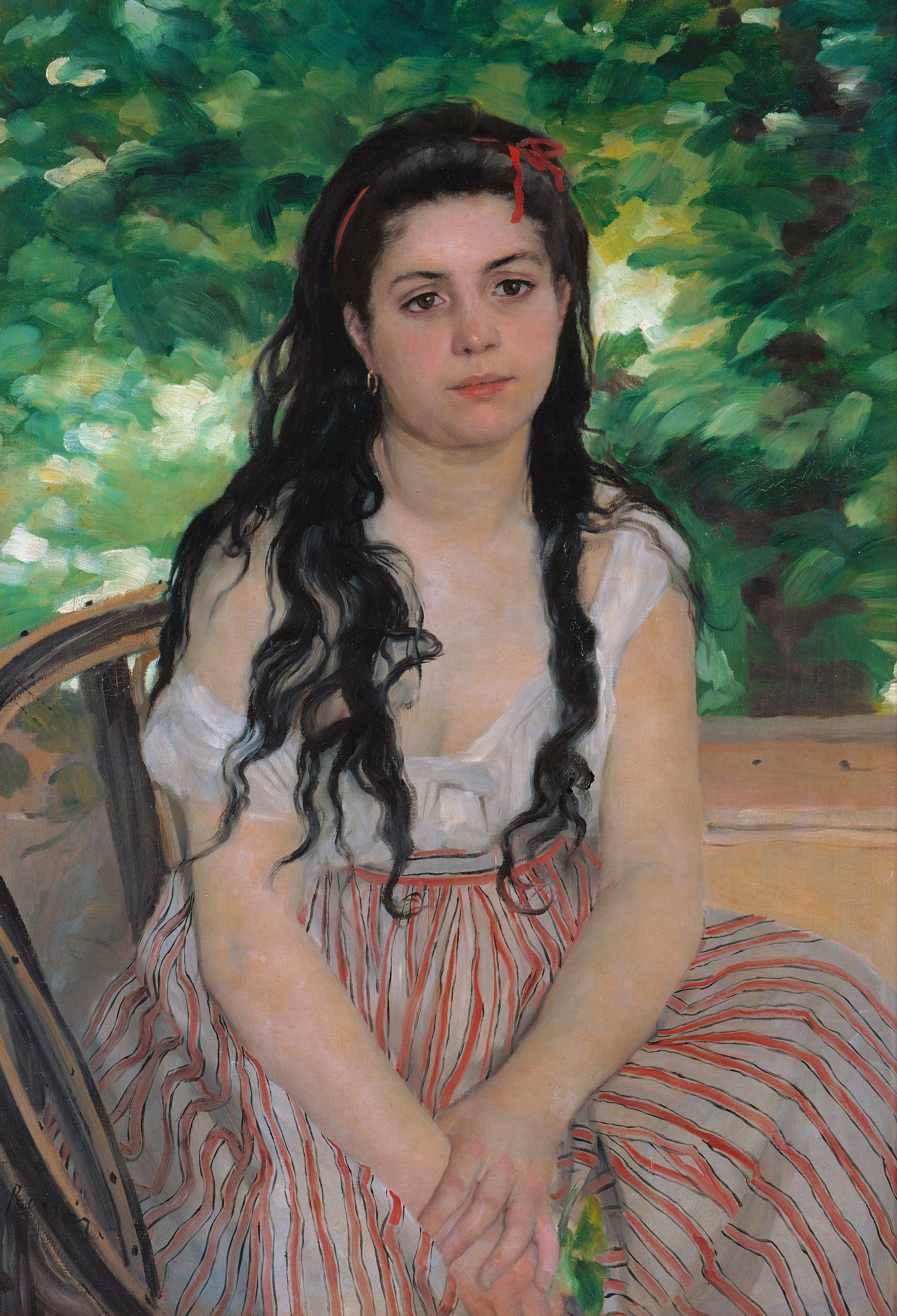
- Artist: Pierre-Auguste Renoir
- Year: 1868
- Medium: oil on canvas
- Dimensions: 85 cm × 59 cm (33 in × 23 in)
- Location: Alte Nationalgalerie, Berlin

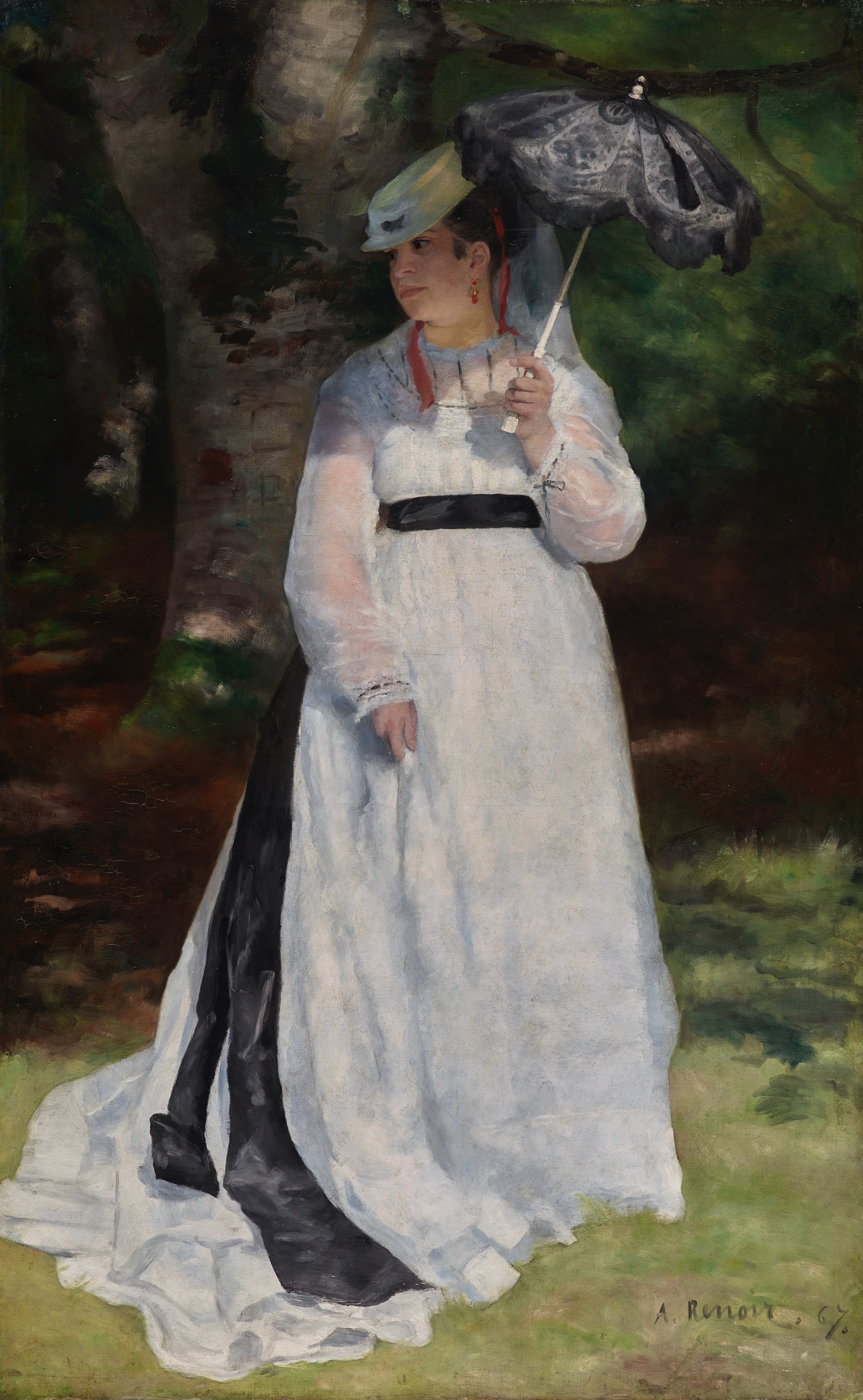
Lise with a Parasol, 1867

In Summer (French: En été, or En été, la Bohémienne) is an 1868 oil-on-canvas painting by Pierre-Auguste Renoir, a portrait of Lise Tréhot aged about 20.

== The subject ==
Tréhot was Renoir's companion from about 1866 to 1871. He painted her at least 23 times, including Lise with a parasol, painted in 1867, Renoir's first significant critical success which was admired at the Paris Salon of 1868. This success may have inspired Renoir to paint her again, this time in a more informal style.

== Description ==
The painting measures 85 centimetres (33 in) by 59 centimetres (23 in) and is a half-length frontal portrait of a young woman, dressed informally, sitting on a chair beside a wall, possibly on a balcony, with greenery behind. The female figure is carefully finished, but the background is sketched out roughly with bold dashes of colour in broad brushstrokes suggesting sunlit foliage. A thin red hairband pulls her hair back from her face, with dark wavy tresses falling loosely over her shoulders and white bodice. The right strap of the bodice has fallen off her shoulder, creating a very deep neckline. She has a distant expression, gazing to the right of the viewer. Her bare arms lie in her lap, resting on a skirt with red and white stripes, with a few green leaves held in her right hand. The painting is signed "A. Renoir" on part of the chair to the lower left.

== Influences and style ==
Renoir uses the stereotype of the bohemian woman, reminiscent of the famous Esmeralda from Victor Hugo's novel Notre-Dame de Paris. The painting takes inspiration from the Romantic paintings of Eugène Delacroix, particularly his 1823 painting Orphan Girl at the Cemetery in which the subject's bodice also hangs off on one shoulder, and also the Realist works of Gustave Courbet. It is an example of a transition in Renoir's style from more formal studio painting to a looser Impressionist style. It was exhibited at the Salon de Paris in 1869 under the title En été, étude, with the word "étude" (French for "study") added to deflect criticism of the loose, impressionistic style of the background, which was not as highly finished as a completed salon painting (or tableau), such as his 1867 painting of Lise with a parasol.

== Provenance ==
It is not known who purchased the painting from Renoir, but it was acquired from an unnamed art dealer by the art critic Théodore Duret in March 1873, and was acquired by collector François Depeaux (1853-1920). It was auctioned in 1906, and acquired in 1907 by the Alte Nationalgalerie in Berlin using funds donated by Mathilde Kappel, wife of the banker Marcus Kappel.

== See also ==
- List of paintings by Pierre-Auguste Renoir
