= Jules Le Cœur =

Jules Le Cœur (September 17, 1832 – April 26, 1882) was a French architect and painter and a friend and early supporter of Pierre-Auguste Renoir (1841–1919). Le Cœur also appeared as a subject in two of Renoir's paintings, Mother Anthony's Tavern and Jules Le Cœur and his dogs in the forest of Fontainebleau, both in 1866. Jules was the son of Joseph Le Cœur, a carpenter, and Catherine Félicie Jaullain. The architect Charles Le Cœur was his brother. Like his brother, Jules was also an architect and a student of Henri Labrouste. He married Marianne Bouwens in 1861, but she died shortly thereafter in 1863. Subsequently, Le Cœur gave up architecture and devoted himself to painting. By 1865, he was spending time at a house in Bourron-Marlotte and painting in the Fontainebleau forest with Renoir. At the same time, Le Cœur began a relationship with Clémence Tréhot while Renoir was involved with her sister Lise Tréhot who also became his model. Le Cœur died at his home on the rue Campagne-Première at the age of 49 in 1882.

== Selected work ==
- View of Bas-Meudon near Paris
- Portrait de jeune lle assise à l'éventail
- Vue du Val de Grâce
- Greek family in a landscape
- Envol de grues devant une jonque
- Selling fish at Les Halles, Paris
- La joncque

== Related work ==
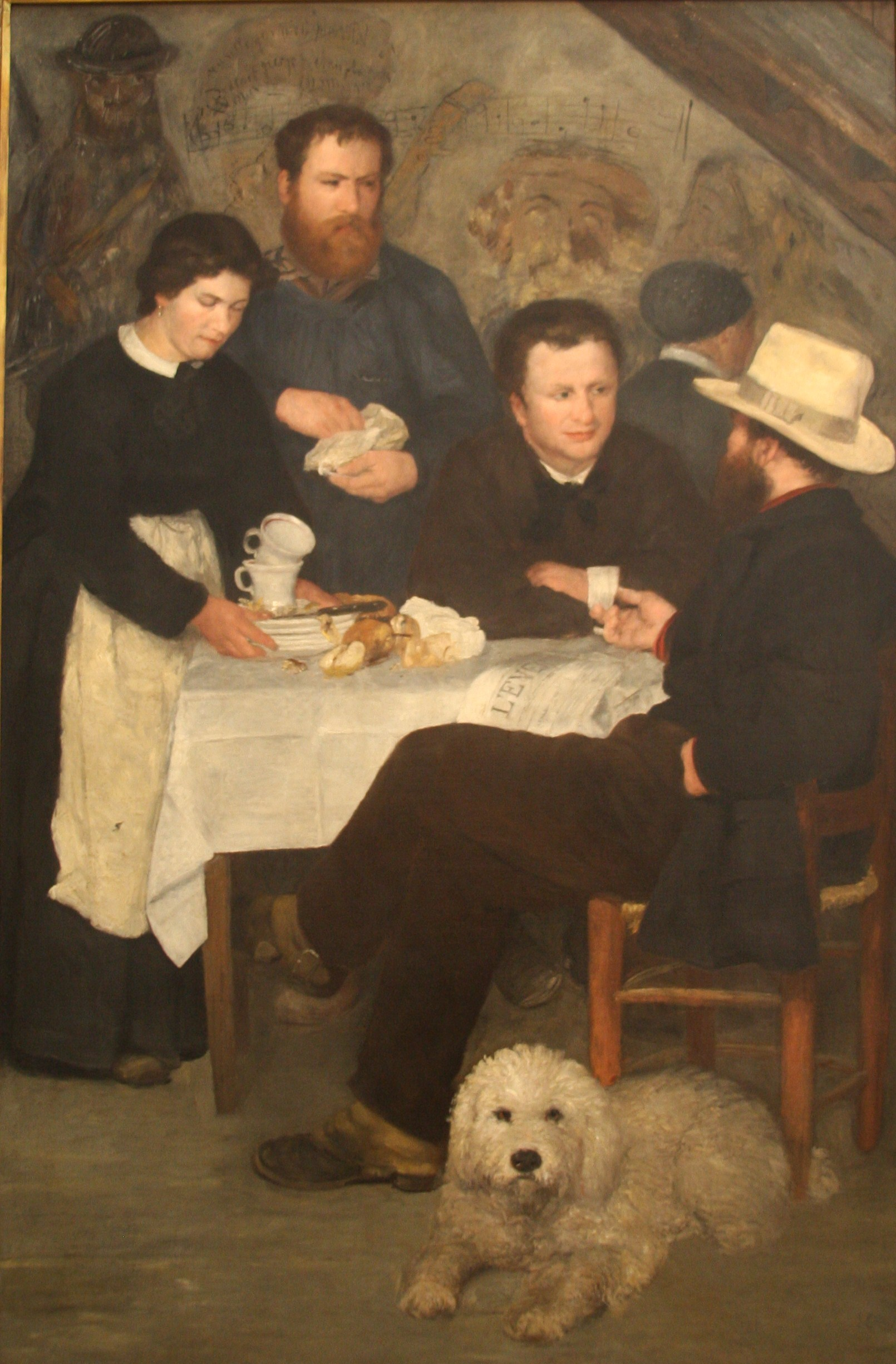
Mother Anthony's Tavern (1866) by Pierre-Auguste Renoir

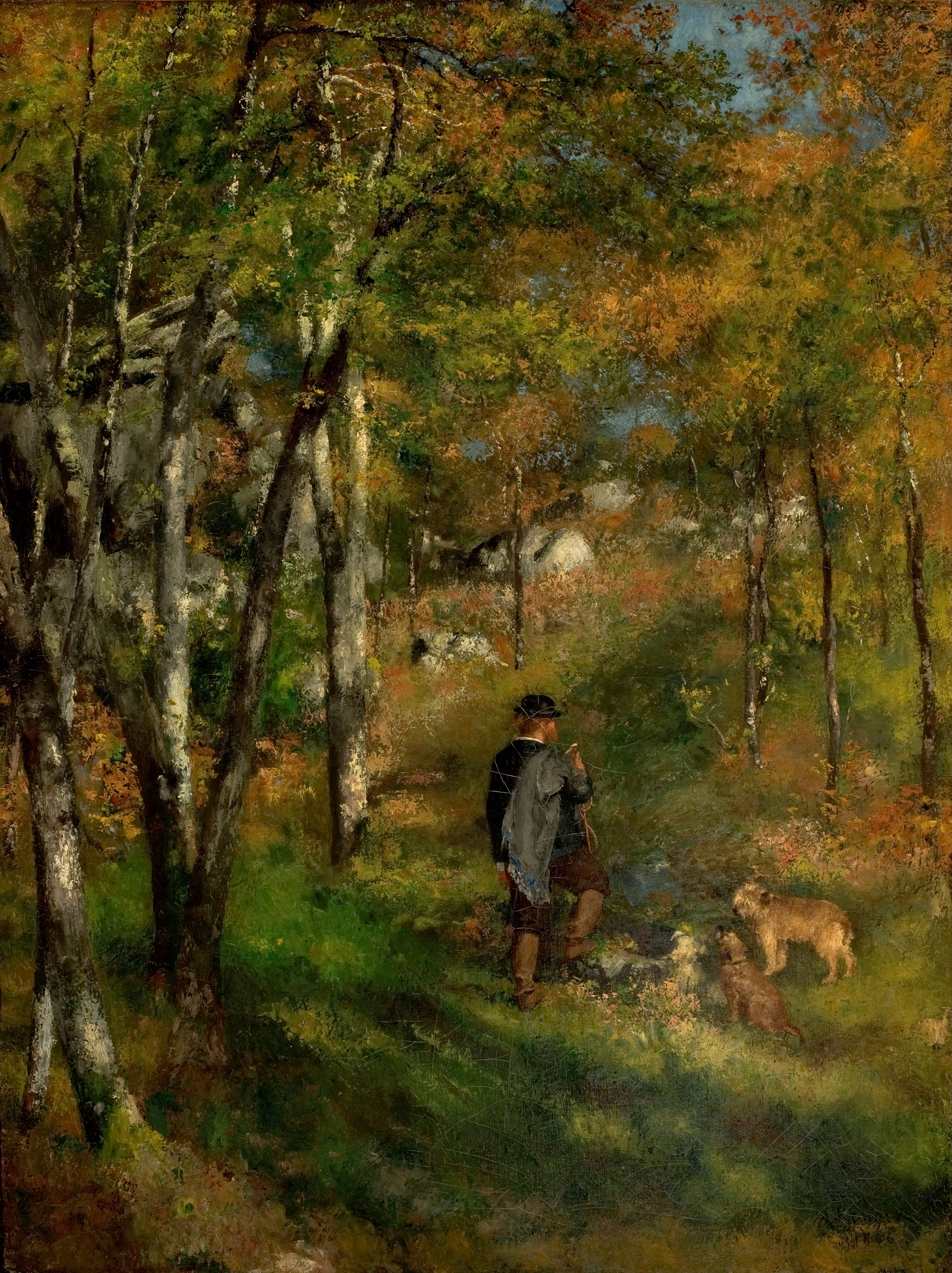
Jules Le Coeur and his dogs in the forest of Fontainebleau (1866) by Pierre-Auguste Renoir

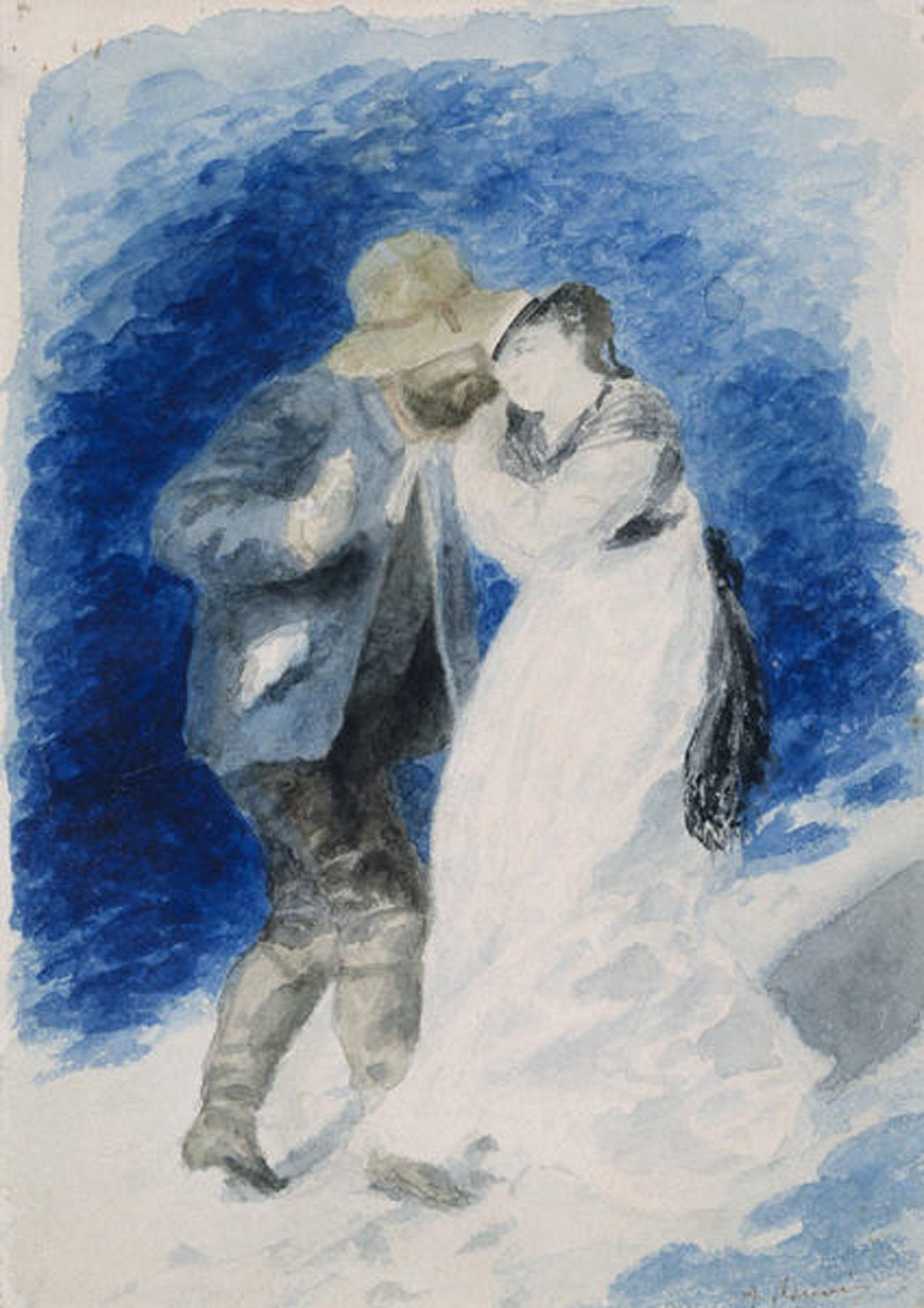
M. Jules Le Coeur and Mlle. Clemence Trehot (1867)
