= Marcus Kappel =

Marcus Kappel, also known as Markus Kappel, (born February 24, 1839 in Cologne; died January 19, 1919 in Berlin) was a German Jewish banker, merchant, art collector and patron of the arts.

== Life ==
Marcus Kappel made his fortune primarily in the grain trade. His company was based in Cologne until 1873, when the headquarters were moved to Berlin. He retired in 1897, but remained a member of the supervisory board of Phönix AG für Bergbau und Hüttenbetrieb. In 1913, he had private assets of around 7.5 million marks, and his income in the same year amounted to 490,000 marks.

== Art collection ==
Marcus Kappel only began his collecting activities after he had retired. Advised by museum director Wilhelm von Bode, he collected Dutch and Flemish paintings from the 17th century, which included works by Willem van Aelst, Gerard Dou, Anthonis van Dyck, Frans Hals, Nicolaes Maes, Gabriel Metsu, Rembrandt van Rijn, Peter Paul Rubens and Jan Steen, which he had hung in a specially constructed skylight room in his house at Tiergartenstrasse 14. Wilhelm von Bode was also responsible for the hanging of the works of art, who based the design on his presentation in the Kaiser Friedrich Museum.

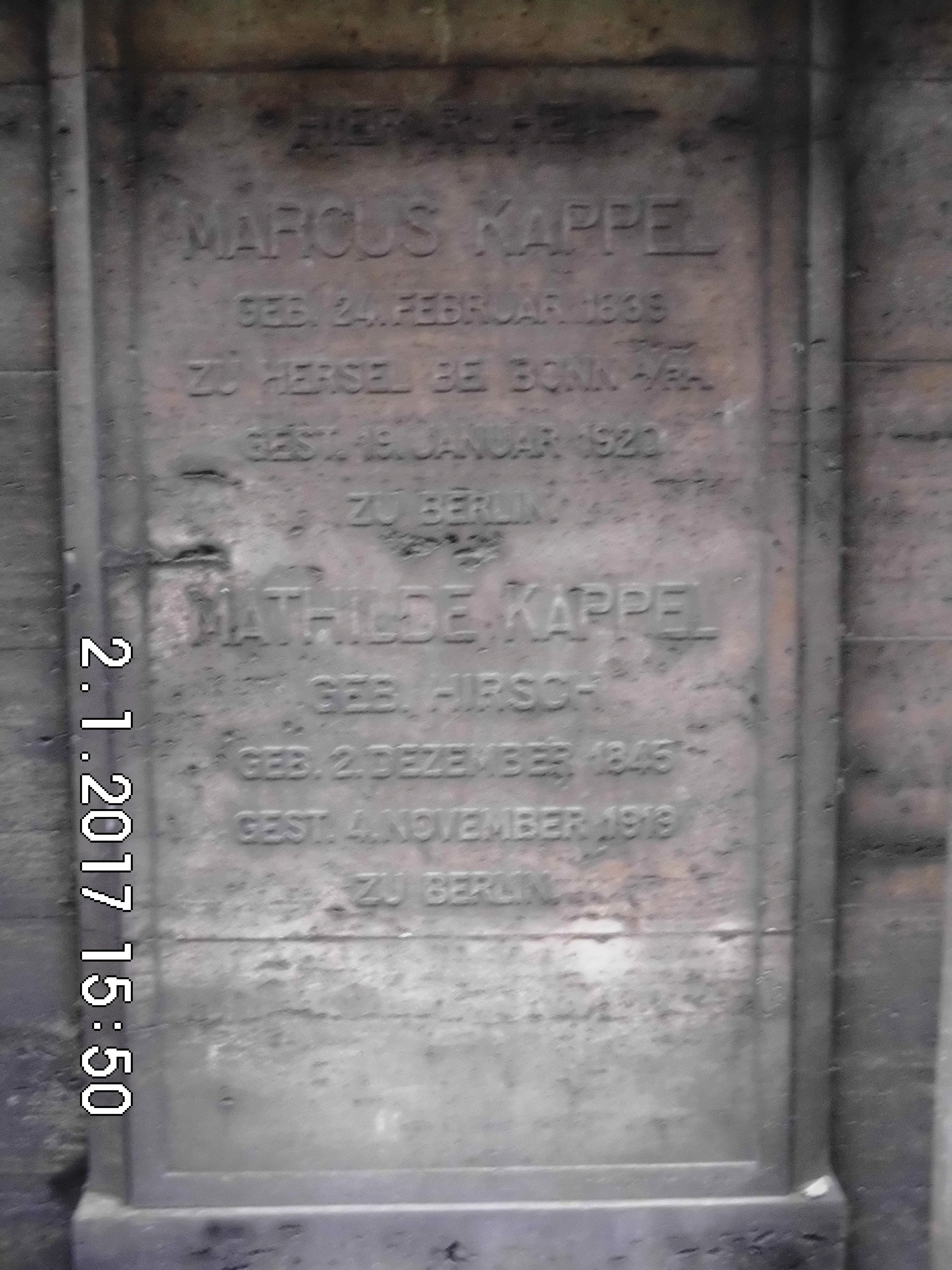
Inschrift für Marcus und Mathilde Kappel auf ihrer Mazevah

Kappel also collected old German, old Dutch, Italian Renaissance art and 19th century art. His favorites included paintings and drawings by Adolph Menzel. Kappel was a member of the Kaiser Friedrich-Museums-Verein and donated a number of works of art to the Berlin museums (Department of Works of Art of the Christian Era, Picture Gallery, National Gallery, Museum of Prints and Drawings and the Islamic and East Asian Collection).

The Kappel family continued the tradition of art collecting after Kappel's death.

== Legacy of Marcus Kappel ==
Kappel rests in the Jewish cemetery on Schönhauser Allee in Berlin-Prenzlauer Berg (Field L1); in addition to his wife Mathilde Kappel née Hirsch (1845-1919), David Kappel ( August 16, 1840- September 24, 1903) and Edith Kappel née Simonsen (* May 28, 1853- October 2, 1920) were also buried in the family vault. He and Mathilde had three children: Hedwig Martha Kristeller; Antonie "Tony" Elise Friederike Noah et Marie Betty Rathenau who predeceased Kappel, leaving four grandchildren, who included notable art collectors Ernest Rathenau and folklorist Ellen Ettlinger-Rathenau who settled in England after fleeing the Nazis.

== Literature ==
- Sven Kuhrau: Der Kunstsammler im Kaiserreich. Kunst und Repräsentation in der Berliner Privatsammlerkultur. Ludwig, Kiel 2005, ISBN 3-937719-20-2.
- Rosemarie Köhler, Ulrich Kratz-Whan: Der Jüdische Friedhof Schönhauser Allee, Berlin. Haude & Spener, Berlin 1992, ISBN 3-7759-0340-2, S. 97, Nr. 124/L1
