= Aileen Ribeiro =

British historian, author and professor

Aileen Ribeiro is a historian of fashion and author of several books about the history of costume.

She was educated at King's College, London and at The Courtauld Institute of Art, also in London, where she later became a professor and lectured on the history of dress. She was Head of the History of Dress section at the Courtauld Institute from 1975 till 2009. In 2000 Ribeiro was appointed professor in the History of Art at the University of London where she is now professor emeritus.

== Works ==
- Visual History of Costume: Eighteenth Century (Batsford, 1983).
- Dress in Eighteenth Century Europe, 1715-89 (Batsford, 1984; 2nd edition 2002).
- The Dress Worn at Masquerades in England, 1730 to 1790, and Its Relation to Fancy Dress in Portraiture (Taylor & Francis, 1984).
- Dress and Morality (Batsford, 1986; 2nd edition 2003).
- Female Face (Tate, 1987).
- Fashion in the French Revolution (Batsford, 1988).
- (with Valerie Cumming), A Visual History of Costume (Batsford, 1989).
- Ingres in Fashion: Representations of Dress and Appearance in Ingres's Images of Women (Yale University Press, 1999).
- The Gallery of Fashion (National Portrait Gallery, 2000).
- Fashion and Fiction. Dress in Art and Literature in Stuart England (Yale University Press, 2005).
- ‘A 'most extraordinary figure, handsome and bold.' Gainsborough's Portrait of Ann Ford 1760’, in Benedict Leca (ed.), Thomas Gainsborough and the Modern Woman (D Giles, 2010).
- ‘What do artists see in dress?’, in Ioanna Papantoniou (ed.), Endyesthai (To dress), Towards a Costume Culture Museum (Peloponnesian Folklore Foundation, 2010).
- Facing Beauty: Painted Women and Cosmetic Art (Yale University Press, 2011).
- Clothing Art: The visual culture of fashion 1600 - 1914 (Yale University Press, 2017).
