= Théodore Duret =

French journalist, author and art critic (1838–1927)

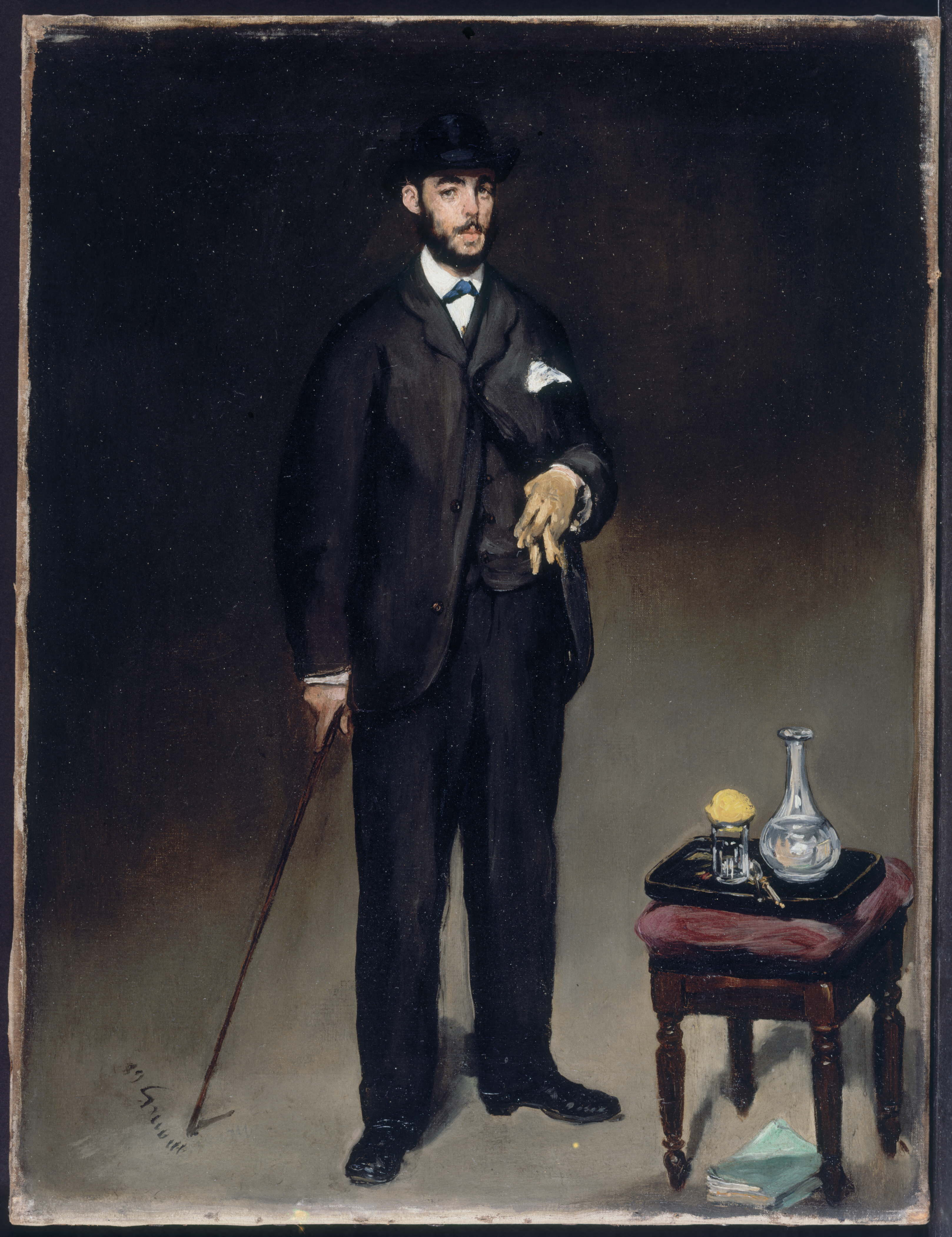
- Portrait of Théodore Duret by Édouard Manet, 1868
- Born: 20 January 1838; Saintes
- Died: 16 January 1927 (aged 88); Paris

Théodore Duret (French: [teodɔʁ dyʁɛ]; 20 January 1838 – 16 January 1927) was a French journalist, author and art critic. He was one of the first advocates of Courbet, Manet, and the Impressionists. One of his best known works is Critique d'Avant Garde (Paris, 1885) which was written in support of the Impressionist movement. He also served as collecting advisor and buying agent for American art collector Louisine Havemeyer.

== Biography ==
Théodore Duret was heir to a firm of Cognac dealers, was a collector, orientalist, and art critic.

=== Travels in Asia ===
In September 1871, Duret traveled throughout Asia alongside the collector Henri Cernuschi. Together, the two men visited Japan, China, Mongolia, Java, and Indonesia in an effort to collect art objects and artworks. Duret was particularly interested in purchasing Japanese prints and illustrations. In collecting these objects, he sought to discover what he called, "the real Japan." Upon his return to Paris, Duret published his Voyage en Asie in 1873, which documented the collector's travels and purchases throughout Asia. Although Duret recounts his personal travels in Voyage en Asie, he also comments on the family structures, languages, and religious practices of the countries he visited.

=== Whistler painting ===
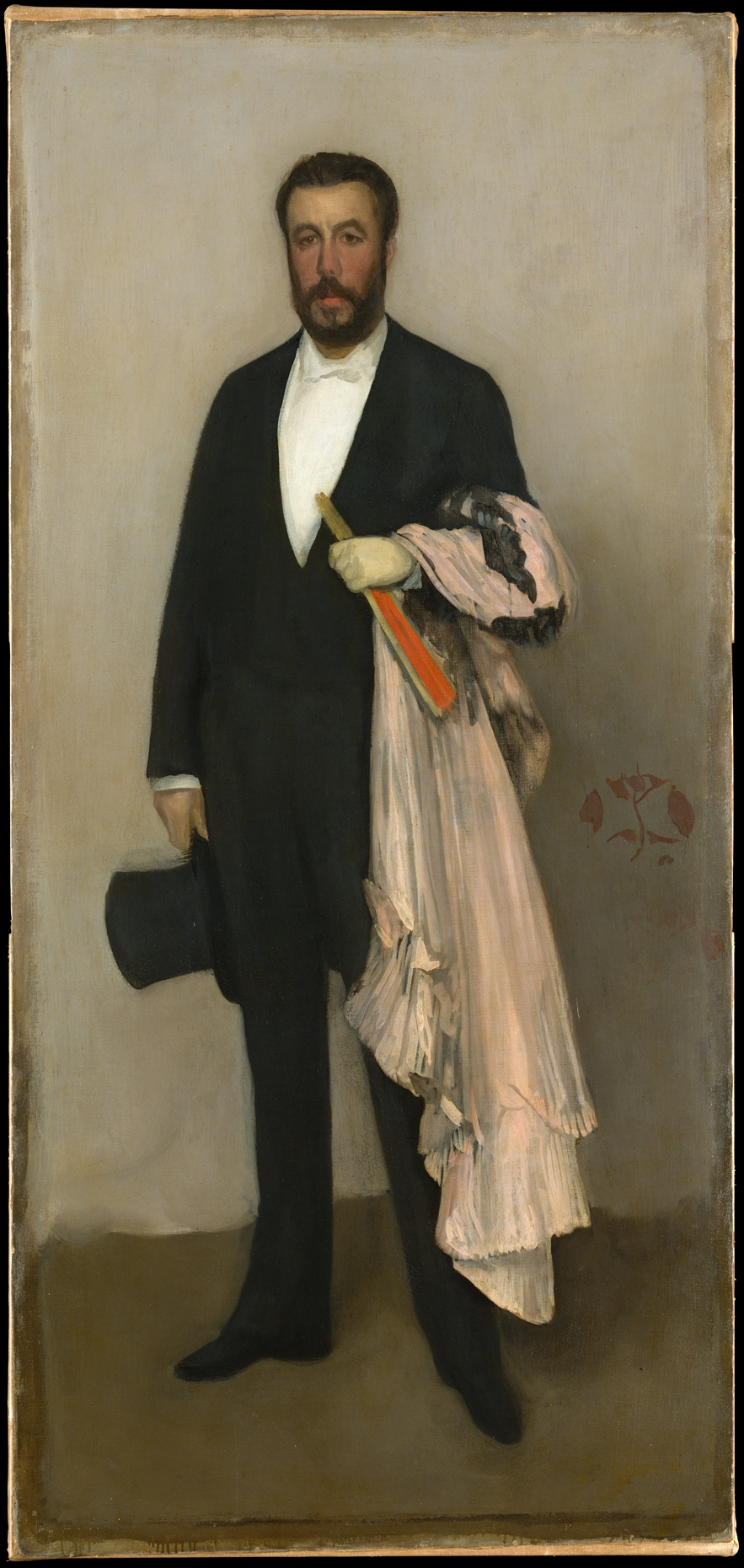
Portrait of Théodore Duret by James McNeill Whistler, 1883

He was introduced to Whistler by Manet and posed for a portrait by Whistler in 1883 at Whistler's London studio at 13 Tite Street. At Duret's request, Whistler painted him in full evening dress, but Whistler suggested that he hold a pink domino, an addition necessary to the decorative arrangement of the composition. Whistler worked on the portrait over a long period of time, even though the finished work ultimately looks like a rapid sketch. Acclaimed when exhibited at the Paris Salon of 1885, it was ranked by many as the best portrait of Duret painted by any of the great Realist artists of the period.

== Works ==
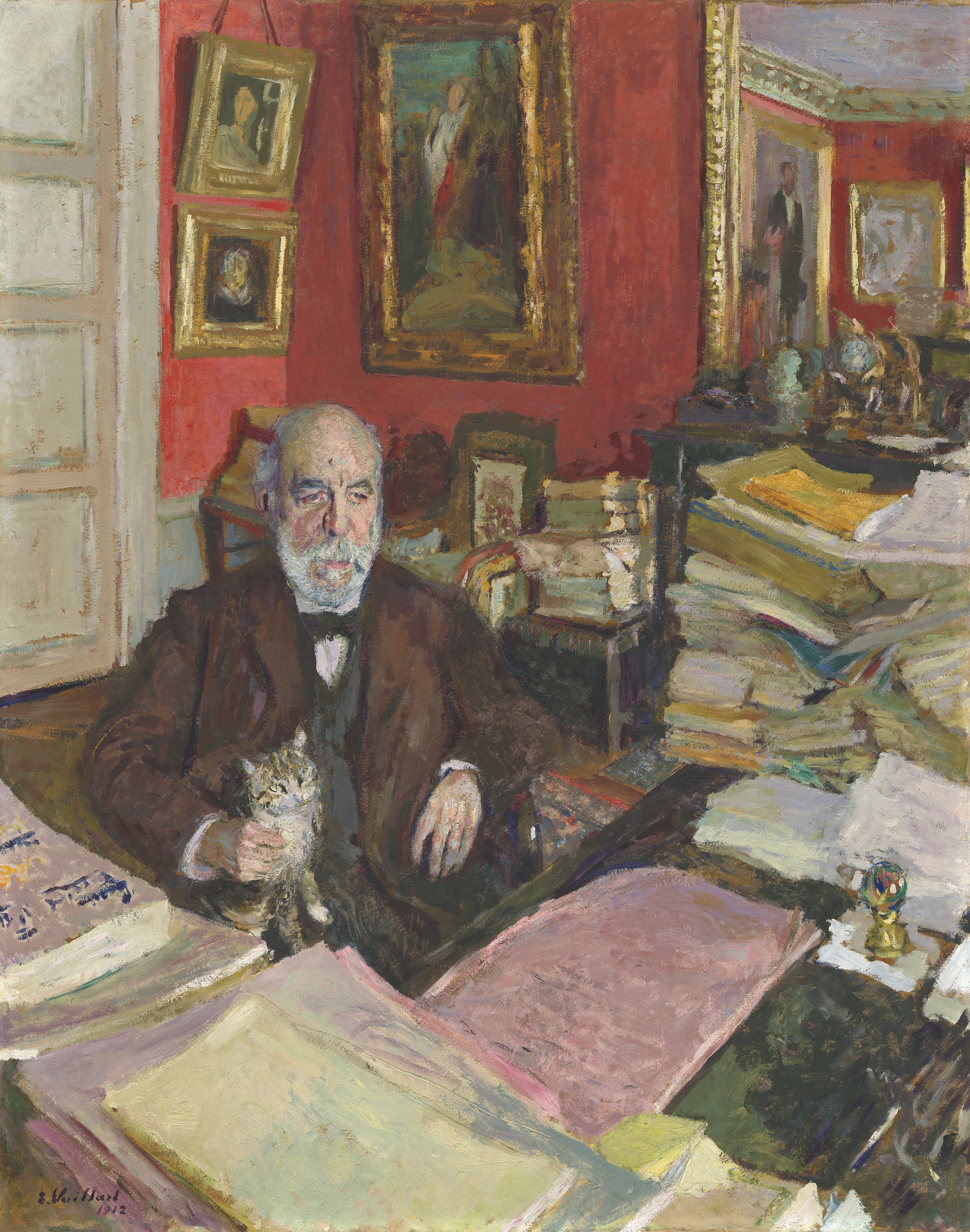
Portrait of Théodore Duret by Édouard Vuillard, 1912, National Gallery of Art, Washington D.C.

- Duret, Théodore (1867). Les peintres français en 1867 (in French). Dentu.
- Duret, Théodore (1874). Voyage en Asie : le Japon, la Chine, la Mongolie, Java, Ceylan, l'Inde (in French). Michel Lévy frères – via Gallica.
- Duret, Théodore (1878). Histoire des peintres impressionnistes (in French). Librairie Parisienne.
- Duret, Théodore. Histoire de d'Édouard Manet et de son œuvre. Charpentier et Fasquelle.
- Duret, Théodore (1919) Vincent Van Gogh. Bernheim Jeune et Cie.
- Duret, Théodore (1920). Lautrec. Paris: Bernheim-Jeune – via archive.org.

== Notes ==
- Shigemi Inaga: Théodore Duret (1838–1927). Paris 1988
- Jean Selz: Lexikon des Impressionismus Cologne 1977 ISBN 3-7701-0860-4
- John Rewald: Die Geschichte des Impressionismus Cologne 1979 ISBN 3-7701-5561-0
- Chang, Ting (2002). "Collecting Asia: Théodore Duret's "Voyage en Asie" and Henri Cernuschi's Museum". Oxford Art Journal. 25 (1): 17–34. ISSN 0142-6540
