= Mother Anthony's Tavern =

1866 painting by Pierre-Auguste Renoir

Mother Anthony’s Tavern
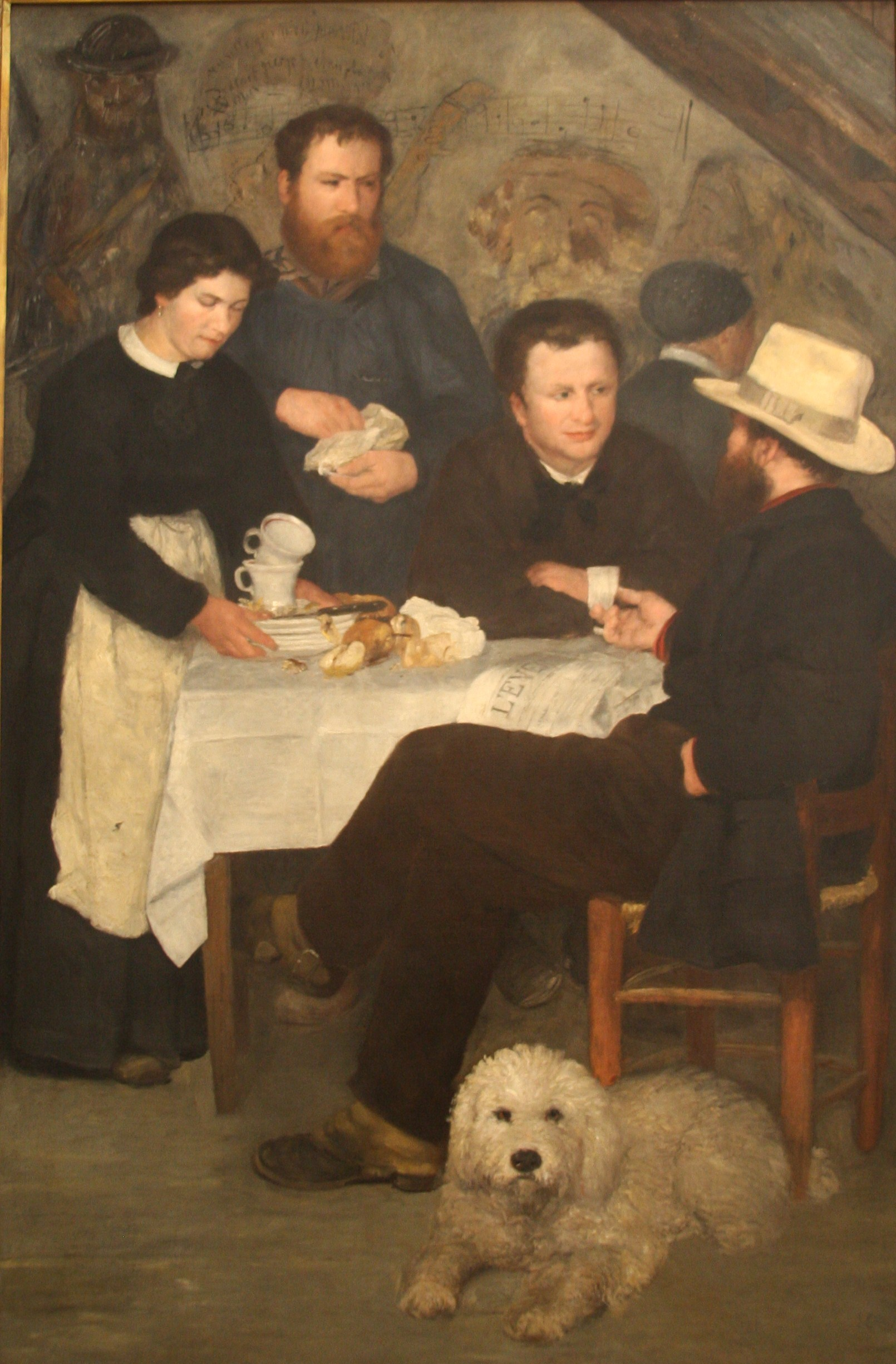
- Artist: Pierre-Auguste Renoir
- Year: 1866
- Medium: Oil on canvas
- Dimensions: 194 cm × 131 cm (76 in × 52 in)
- Location: Nationalmuseum

Mother Anthony's Tavern (French: Le cabaret de la Mère Antony à Bourron-Marlotte), also known as At the Inn of Mother Anthony, is an 1866 oil-on-canvas painting made by French artist Pierre-Auguste Renoir during his Fontainebleau period. It is one of Renoir's first major paintings, having completed it at the age of 25. The work is currently in the collection of the Nationalmuseum in Stockholm.

== Description ==
Although there are various competing interpretations of the figures depicted in the painting, it is thought that the girl clearing plates in the front left of the painting is Nana; painter and architect Jules Le Coeur (1832-1882) appears as the bearded man standing up preparing to roll a cigarette, the clean-shaven man sitting down facing the viewer is thought to be Dutch landscape artist "Bos", a friend of Le Coeur; artist Alfred Sisley (1839–1899) appears as the bearded man seated with a hat next to Toto, a three-legged poodle with a wooden leg; in the far right background we see the back of the proprietor, Madame Anthony, wearing a headscarf. Behind her, on the wall, is an image of French novelist and poet Henry Murger (1822–1861), an icon of Bohemianism.

== Influences ==
The painting After Dinner at Ornans (1848–1849) by Gustave Courbet informs this work, showing the influence of Courbet on the early Renoir.

== See also ==
- List of paintings by Pierre-Auguste Renoir
