= Toulmouche =

Toulmouche may refer to:

- Auguste Toulmouche (1829–1890), French painter
- Frédéric Toulmouche (1850–1919), French composer
