= Abbey of Blanche-Couronne =

Abbey in Loire-Atlantique, France

Coordinates: 47.3510°N 1.9857°W

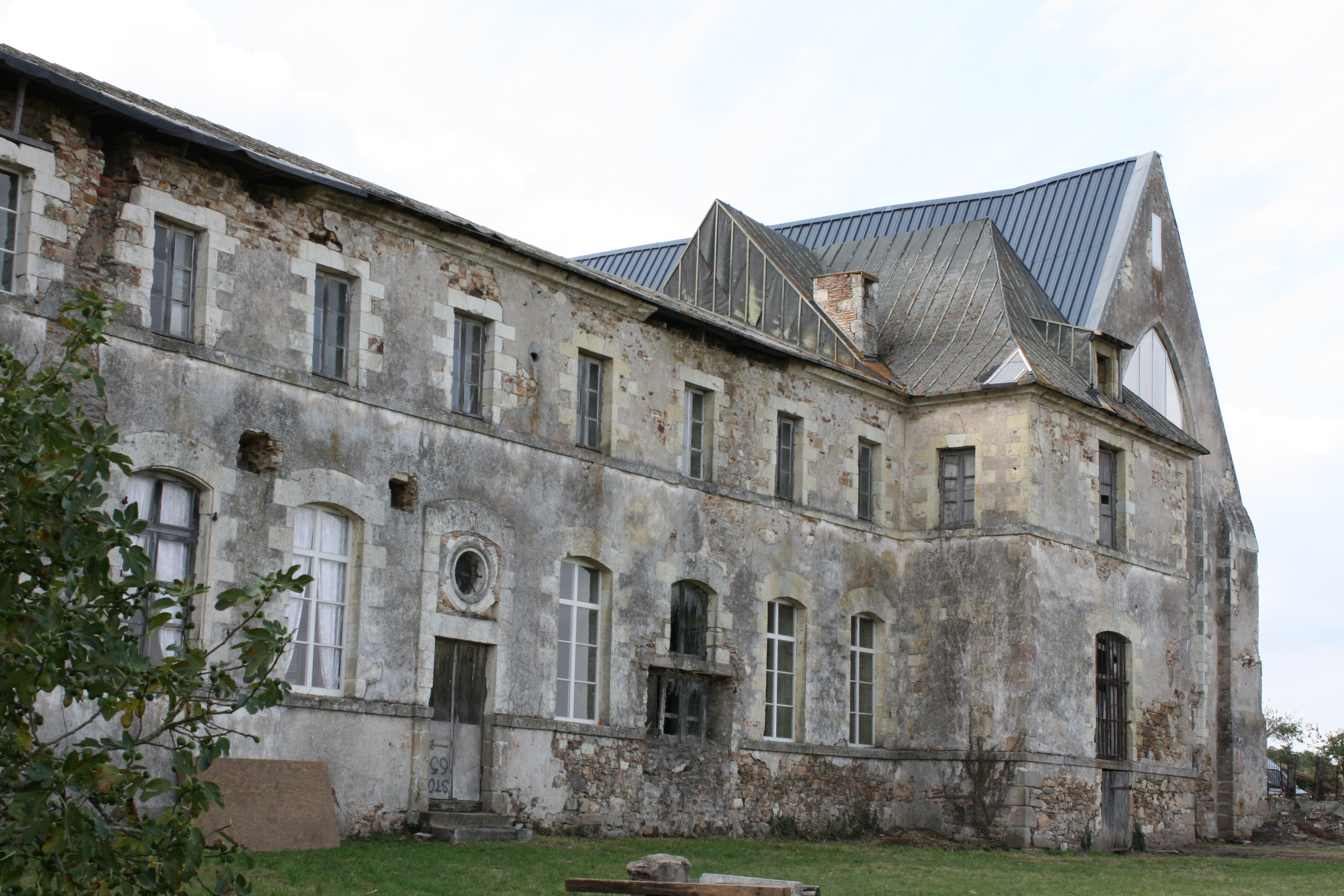
Abbey of Blanche-Couronne

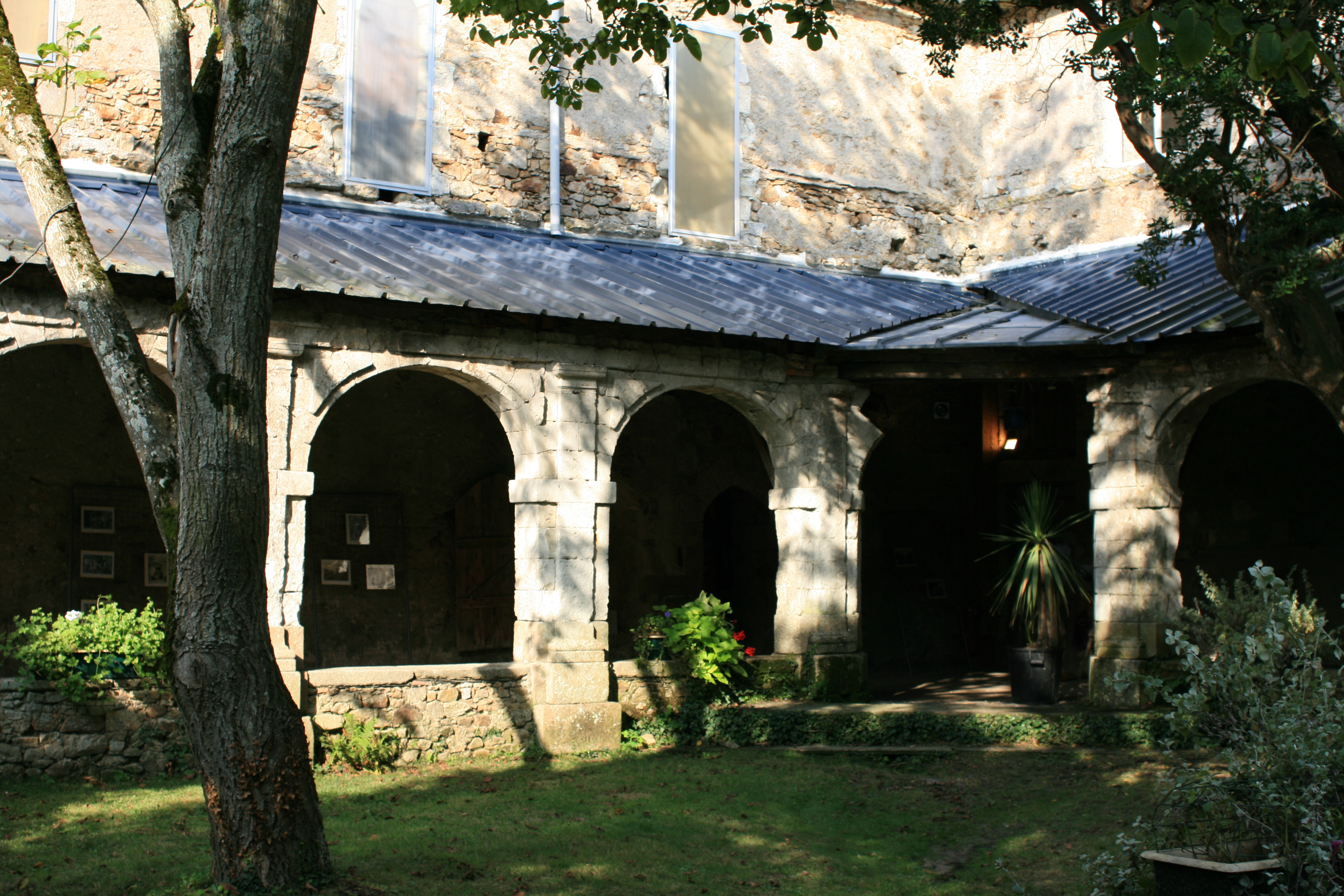
Cloister of the Abbey of Blanche-Couronne

The Abbey of Our Lady of Blanche-Couronne (Abbaye Notre-Dame de Blanche-Couronne) is a former Benedictine and Cistercian abbey located in La Chapelle-Launay in the department of Loire-Atlantique in France.

== History ==
The abbey is situated on a rocky prominence above a floodplain of an arm of the Loire River. During its heyday, it controlled the revenues of a number of priories and other properties.

Some historians hold that the abbey was founded in 1160 for sixteen monks who migrated from another abbey. The earliest documented date for the abbey is 1161, with a reference to "Ernaud, abbot of Blanche-Couronne" in documents pertaining to a property dispute.

In 1234, a papal bull issued by Pope Gregory IX conferred special privileges on the abbey and put it under the "rule of Saint Benedict and the institution of the Cistercians". In 1236, the abbot asked for the abbey to be affiliated with the Cistercians, and in 1336, a new papal bull from Pope Benedict XI placed it under the Cistercians. Then in 1410, the French Pope John XXIII placed it under the Benedictines.

Starting in the 16th century, a series of commendatory abbots — often laymen appointed by the king but also prelates like Jean, Cardinal of Lorraine — began the financial ruination of the abbey. The abbey underwent a revival in the early-mid 18th century, when the Benedictines repaired the chapel (1719) and rebuilt some of the buildings (1743). Nonetheless, by 1767 it was down to 4 monks and was shortly thereafter abandoned. During the French Revolution it was nationalized and in 1791 it was sold to René Vigneron, a lawyer and director of the nearby department of the Vendée.

By 1815, it was in the possession of the Laval family. In 1841, it became the property of the Lecadres, a prosperous French merchant family. In the late 19th century it was inherited by Marie Lecadre, the wife of the painter Auguste Toulmouche, and it became a gathering place for Parisian artists and musicians.

In 1922, the department acquired it with an eye to setting up an insane asylum, but this plan never came to fruition. Reprivatized in 1929, it was occupied first by the English and then by the Germans during World War II.

In 1978, an association was formed to preserve the abbey for the future. By then, it was in very bad repair, with several roofless areas (the abbey choir, the east wing). In 1994, the abbey was classified as a national historic monument and restoration efforts have continued in the years since.

== Architecture ==
The abbey's columns and capitals date back to the 12th century. The chapter house dates from the 12th to the 18th centuries. The old cloister dates back to the 12th century, while the frescoes date from the 14th century.

The south façade has a carving of the coat of arms of Jean Briçonnet, vice-chancellor of Brittany and the abbey's first commendatory abbot. In the 19th century, this coat of arms was painted in one of the abbey rooms by Jules-Élie Delaunay, who also painted some large murals.
