= Lost Illusions =

Lost Illusions may refer to:

- Illusions perdues, serial novel published by Honoré de Balzac between 1837 and 1843
- Lost Illusions (painting), 1865 painting by Charles Gleyre
- Lost Illusions (1911 film), directed by Edwin S. Porter
- Elveszett illúziók, 1983 film directed by Gyula Gazdag
- Lost Illusions (ballet), 2011 ballet by Leonid Desyatnikov
- Lost Illusions (2021 film), directed by Xavier Giannoli

== See also ==
- The Lost Illusion, alternate title for the 1948 film The Fallen Idol
