= Auguste Toulmouche =

French painter (1829–1890)

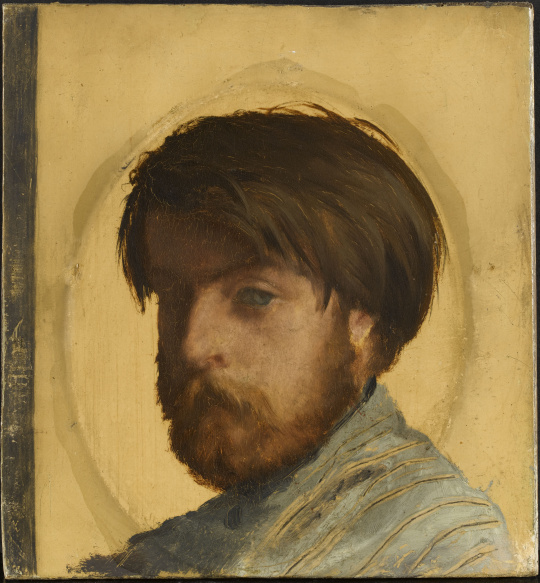
- Portrait of Toulmouche by Jean-Louis Hamon
- Born: 21 September 1829; Nantes, France
- Died: 16 October 1890 (aged 61); Paris, France
- Education: Charles Gleyre
- Relatives: Frédéric Toulmouche (cousin)
- Awards: Commander of the Legion of Honour (1870)

Auguste Toulmouche (21 September 1829 – 16 October 1890) was a French painter known for his luxurious genre paintings of upper middle class Parisian women in domestic scenes.

== Biography ==
Auguste Toulmouche was born in Nantes to Émile Toulmouche, a well-to-do broker, and Rose Sophie Mercier. The composer Frédéric Toulmouche was his cousin. He studied drawing and sculpture locally with the sculptor Amédée Ménard and painting with the portraitist Biron before moving to Paris in 1846 to study with the painter Charles Gleyre. He was said to be one of Gleyre's favored students, and he exhibited his first paintings at the Paris Salon of 1848 when he was just 19. He exhibited again in 1849 and 1850, at which time he was specializing in portraits.

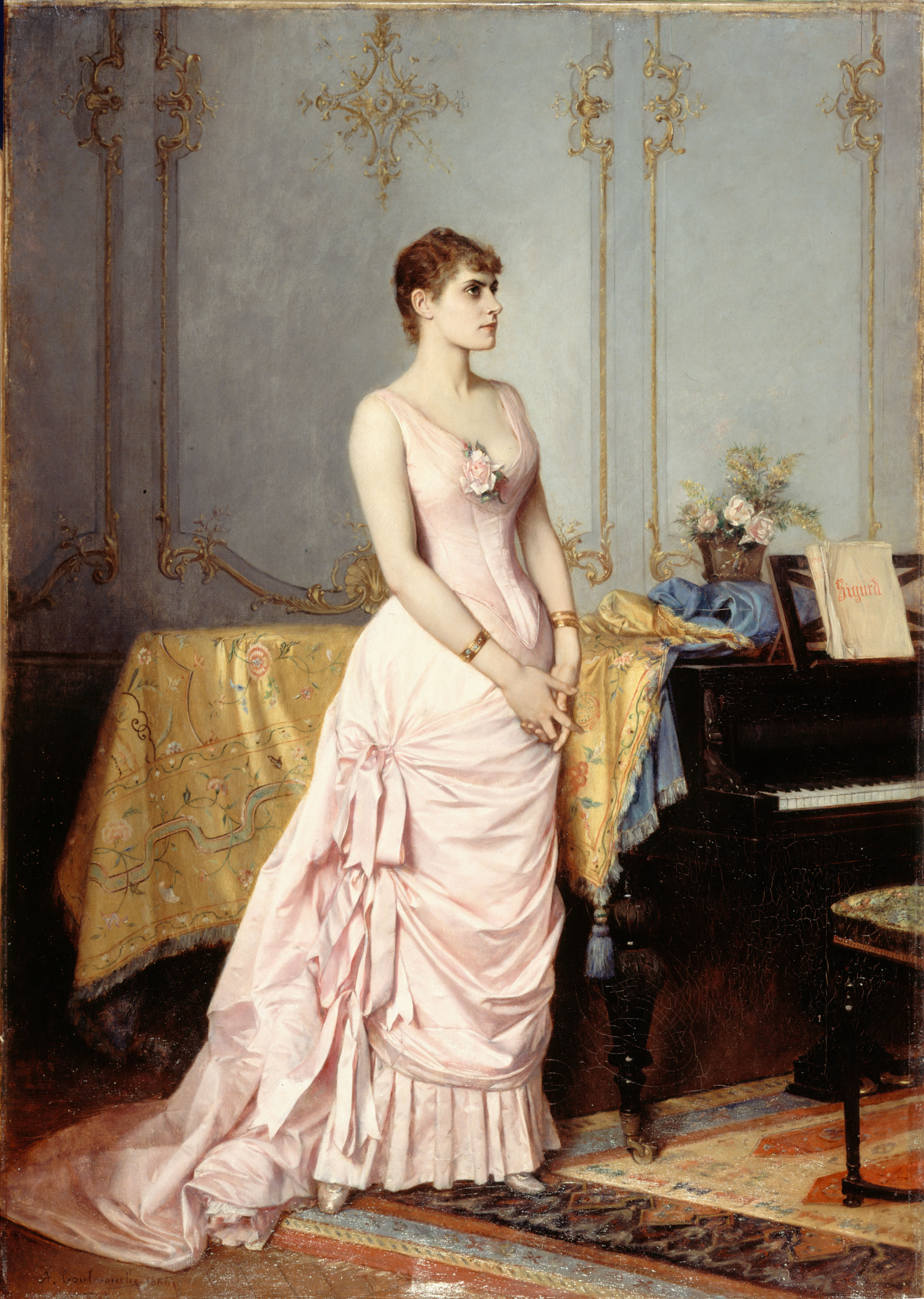
Rose Caron, c. 1880

Toulmouche painted in an idealizing version of the dominant academic realist style, and his subjects were frequently Parisian women who belonged to the upper bourgeoisie. His work was popular in both France and America, and the emperor Napoleon III bought one of his paintings, La fille (The Girl), for his future empress Eugénie in 1852, with further purchases by the imperial family the following year confirming Toulmouche's status as a fashionable painter. He was generally approved by critics, winning medals at the Paris Salon of 1852 and 1861, and he was made a Chevalier of the Legion of Honor in 1870. During his heyday, his reputation was comparable to that of artists like Alfred Stevens and Carolus-Duran. However, with their emphasis on sumptuous clothing and richly furnished domestic interiors, his paintings were also dismissed by some critics as "elegant trifles", and the writer Émile Zola referred somewhat dismissively to the "delicious dolls of Toulmouche". With the rise of Impressionism in the 1870s, his popularity suffered a decline from which it never recovered.

By his 1861 marriage to Marie Lecadre, daughter of Nantes lawyer Alphonse Henri Lecadre, Toulmouche became a cousin by marriage of the painter Claude Monet. Toulmouche sent the young Monet to study with Gleyre.

In 1870, Toulmouche joined one of the battalions defending Paris against the German invasion in the Franco-Prussian War. After the war ended, he spent more time at the Abbey of Blanche-Couronne near Nantes, which was part of a large estate inherited by his wife on the death of her father. He built a workshop on the abbey grounds and invited many Parisian friends to spend time there, including Geneviève Halévy, José-Maria de Heredia, Paul Baudry, Jules-Élie Delaunay, Ernest Reyer, and the young Ignacy Jan Paderewski.

Toulmouche died suddenly in Paris following an episode of syncope, and he is buried at Montparnasse Cemetery.

Much of his work is still in private collections, but the Louvre, the Museum of Fine Arts, Boston, the Sterling and Francine Clark Art Institute, and the Musée d'Arts de Nantes hold examples of his work.

In 2023, his painting La Fiancée hésitante (The Reluctant Bride), not among his best-known works in its time, became a widely spread illustration for women's anger on TikTok.

== Gallery ==
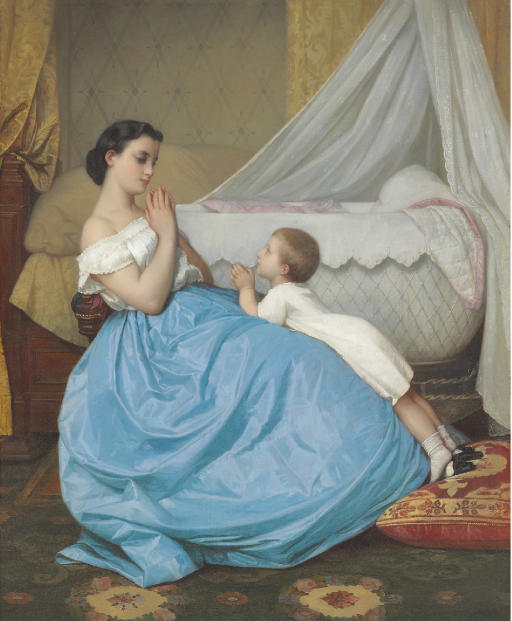
A Bedtime Prayer, 1858

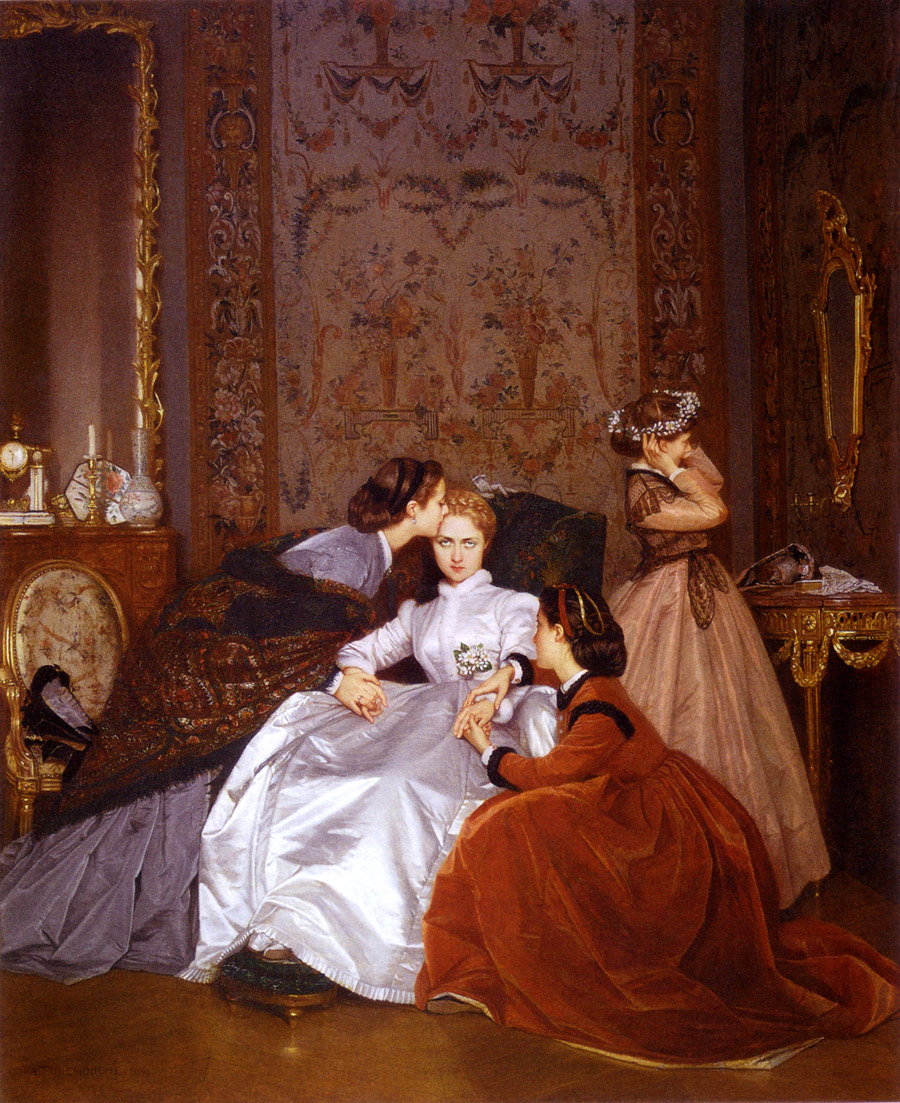
The Reluctant Bride (La Fiancée hésitante), 1866

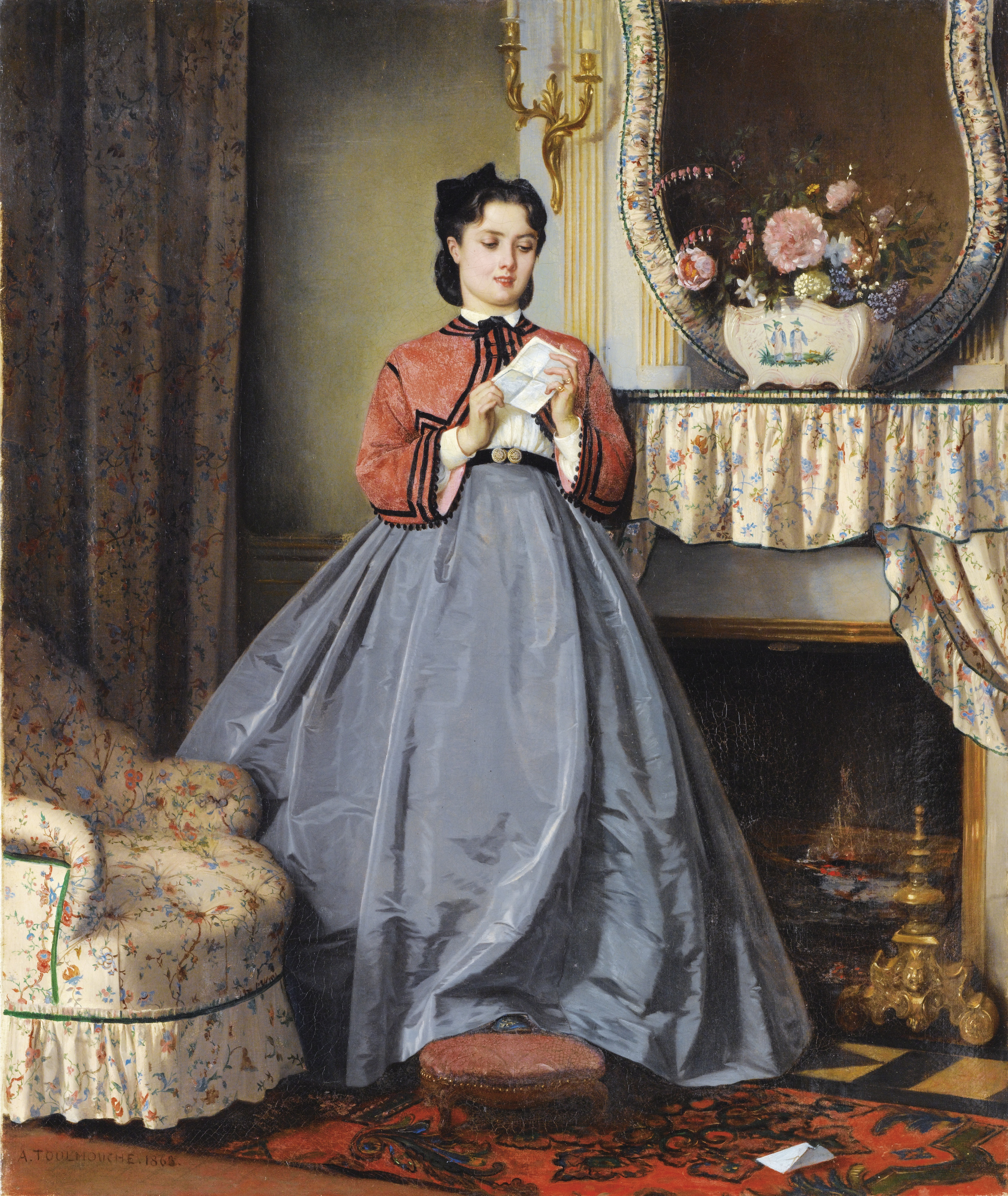
La lettre d'amour, 1863

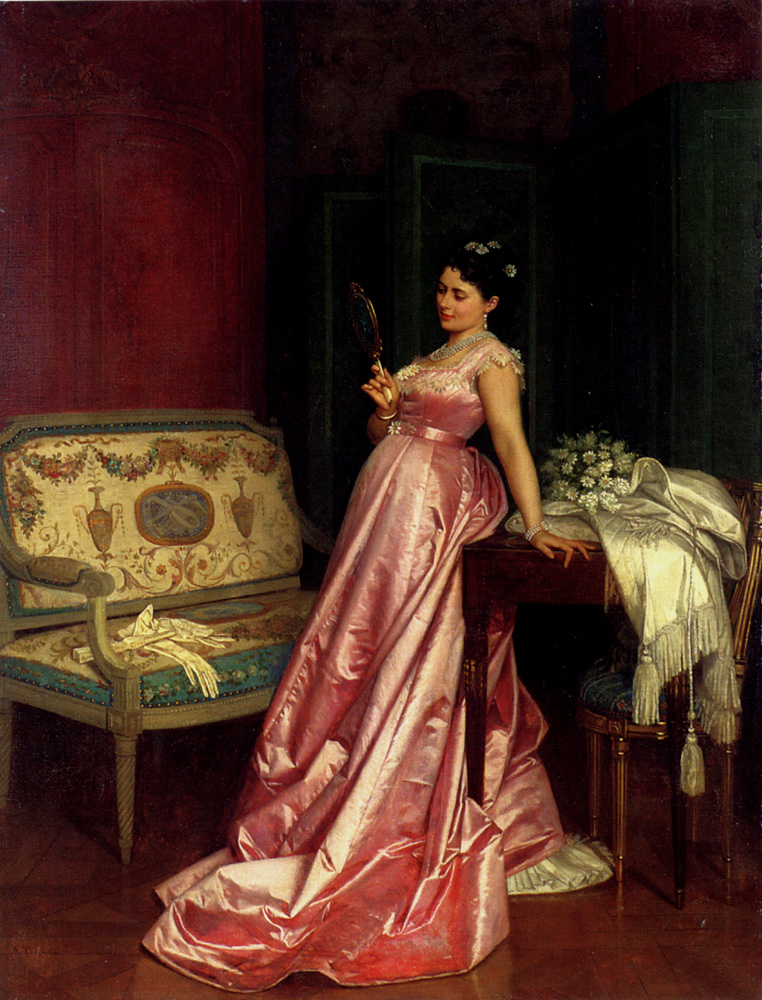
The Admiring Glance, 1868

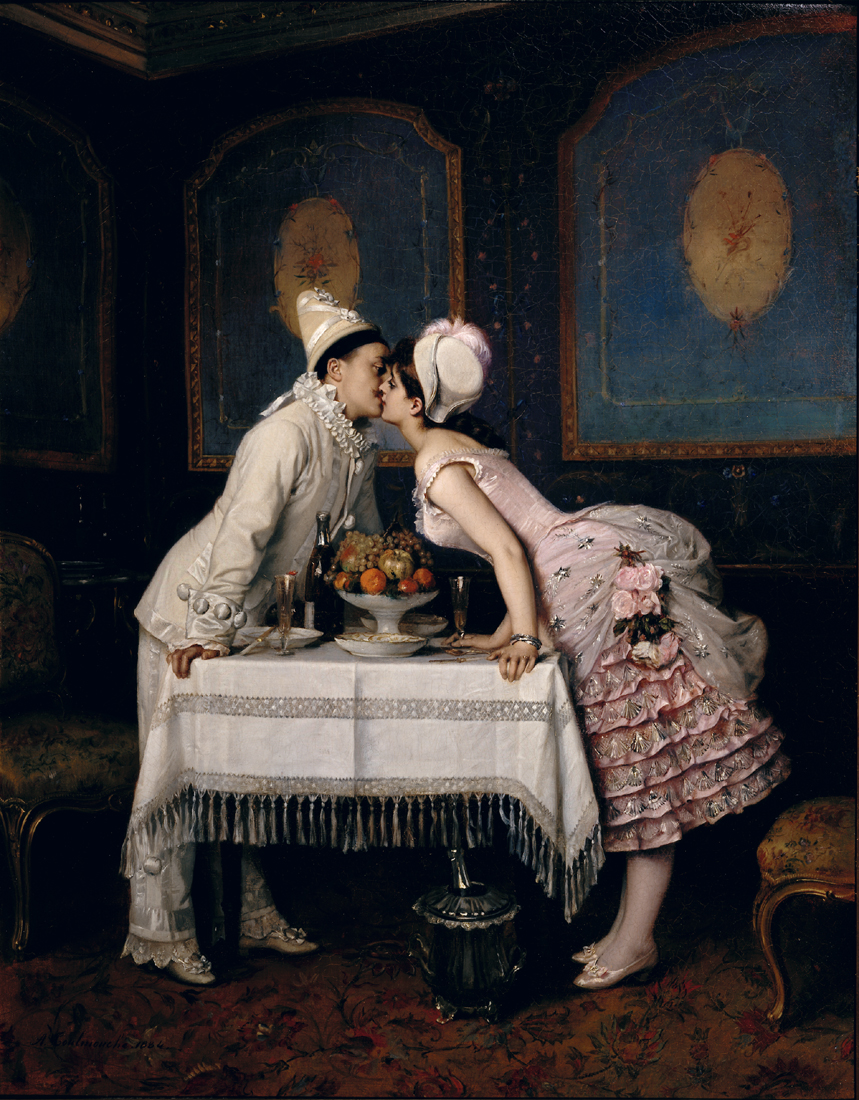
Le Baiser, c. 1870

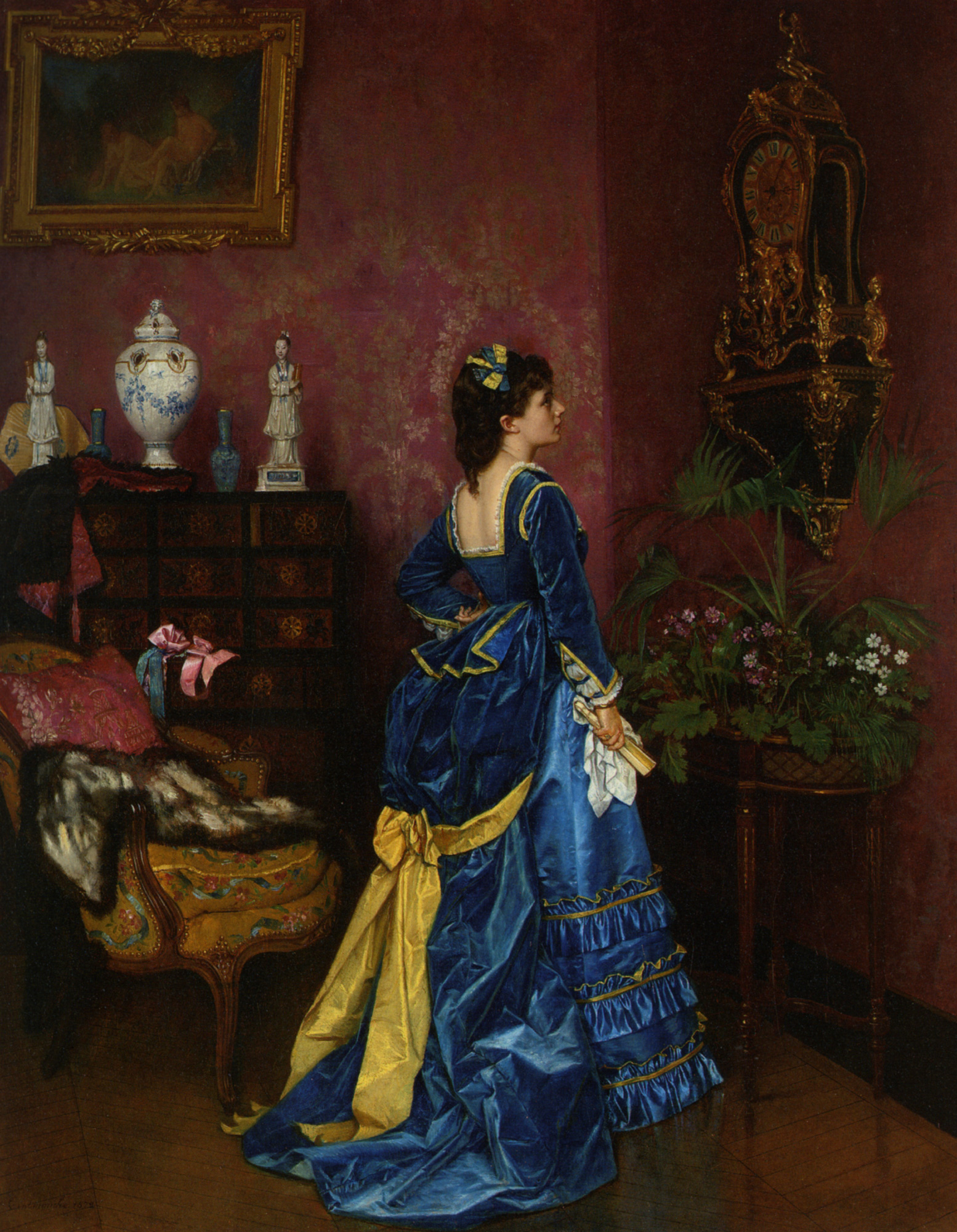
Le robe bleu, c. 1870

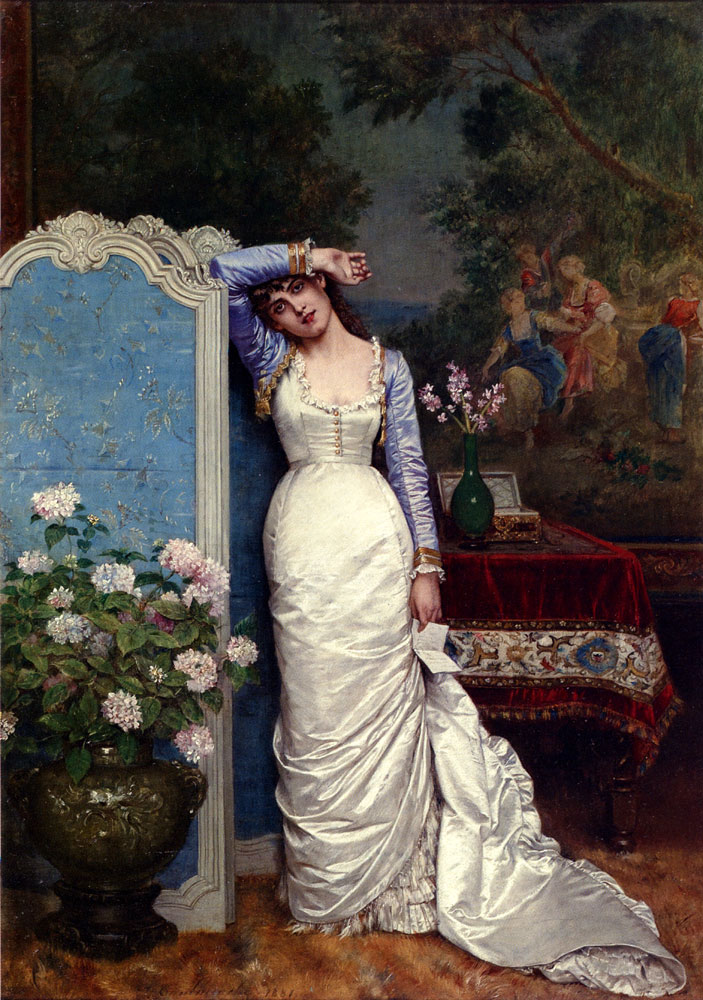
Young Woman in an Interior, c. 1870

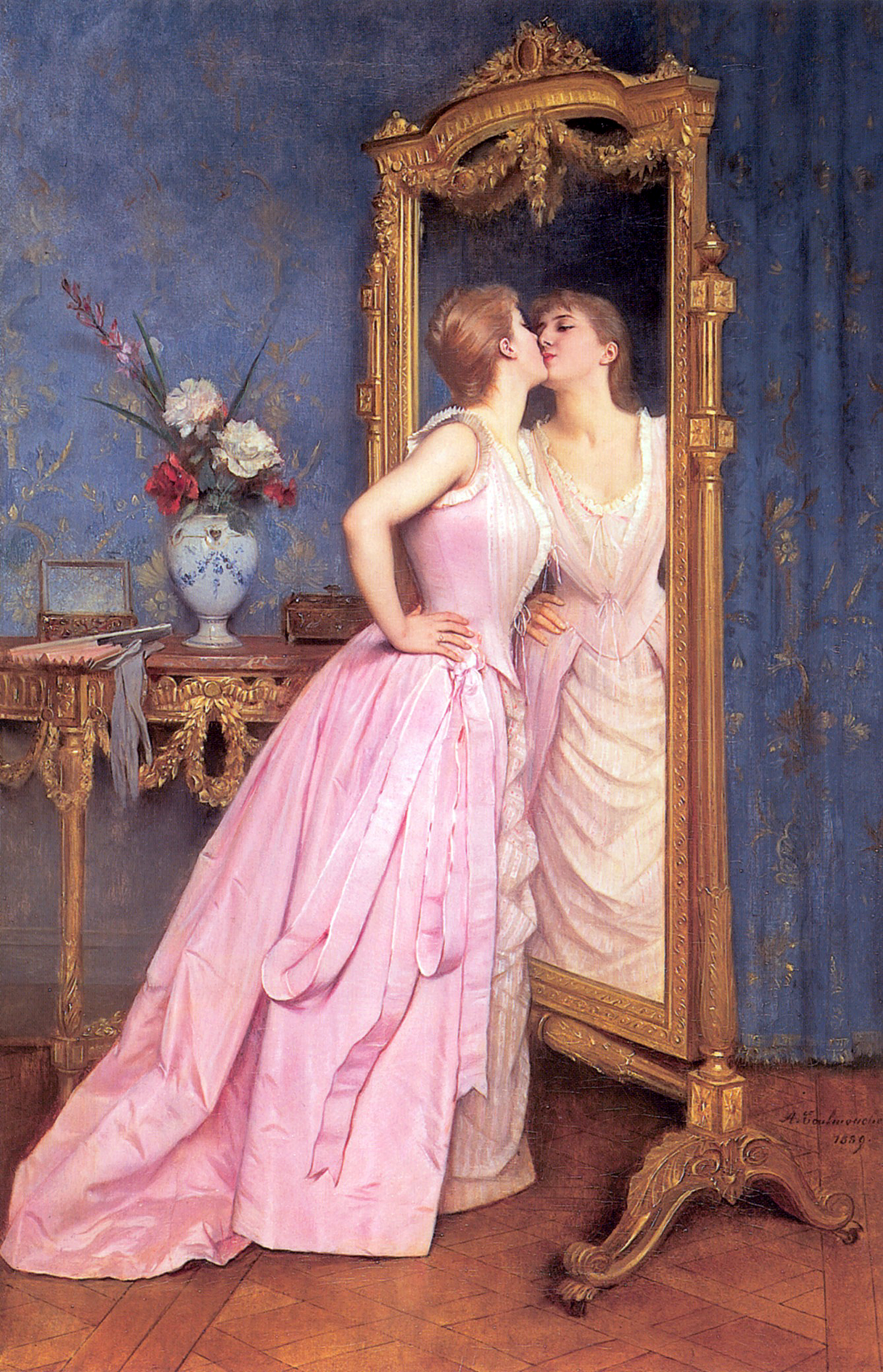
Vanity, c. 1870

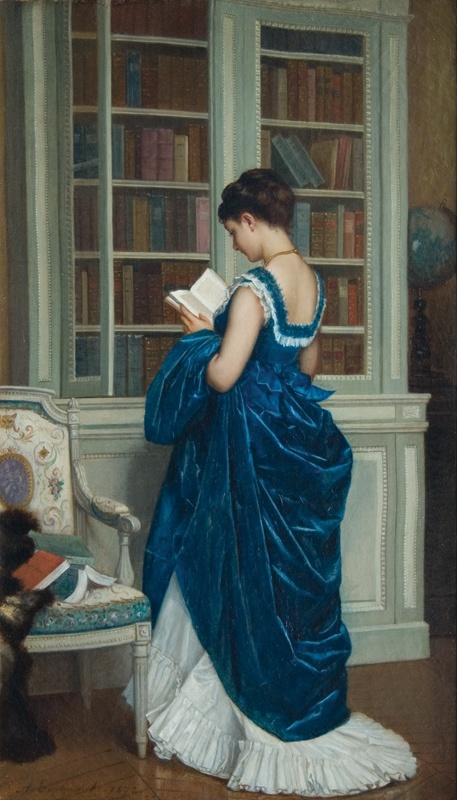
In the Library (Dans la Bibliothèque), 1872

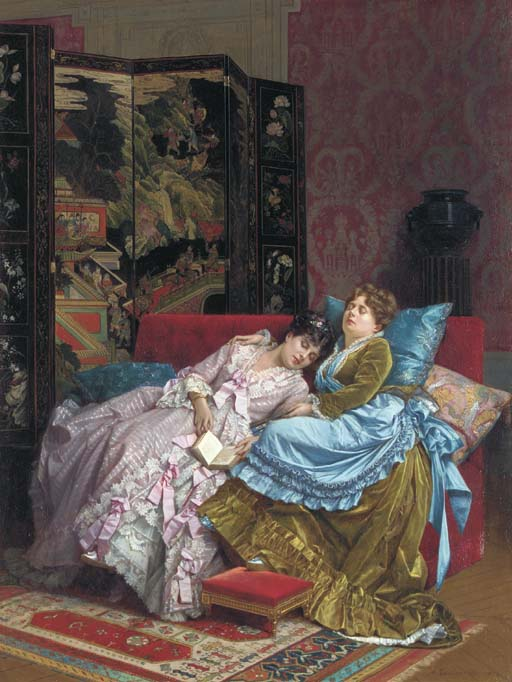
L'Idylle (An Afternoon Idyll), 1874

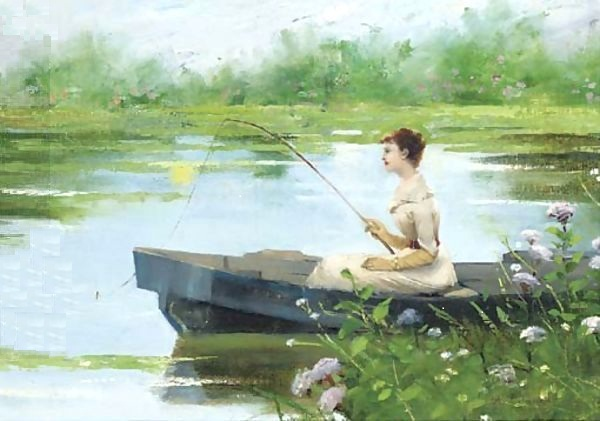
A Tranquil Afternoon, c. 1880

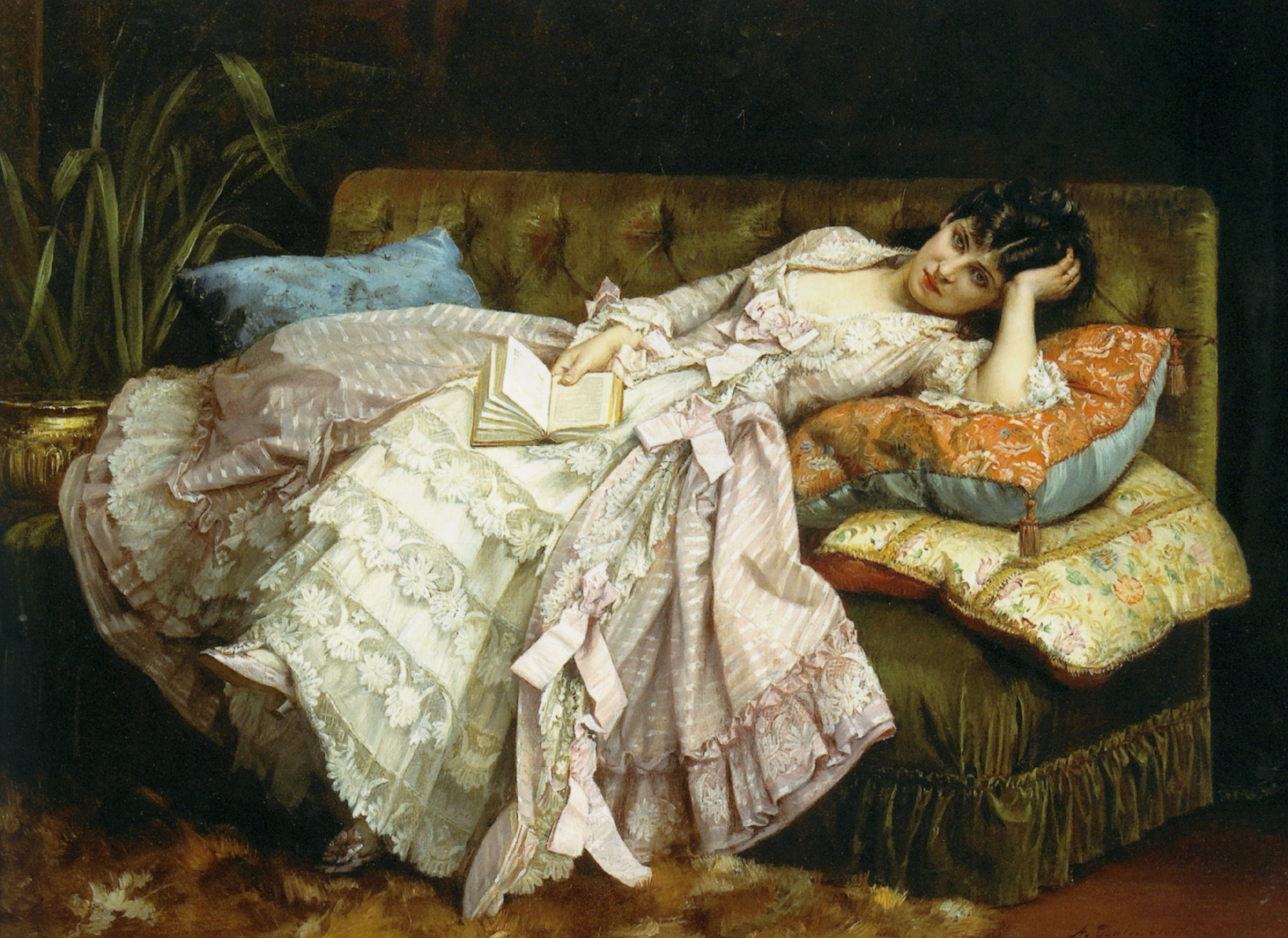
Dolce far niente, 1877

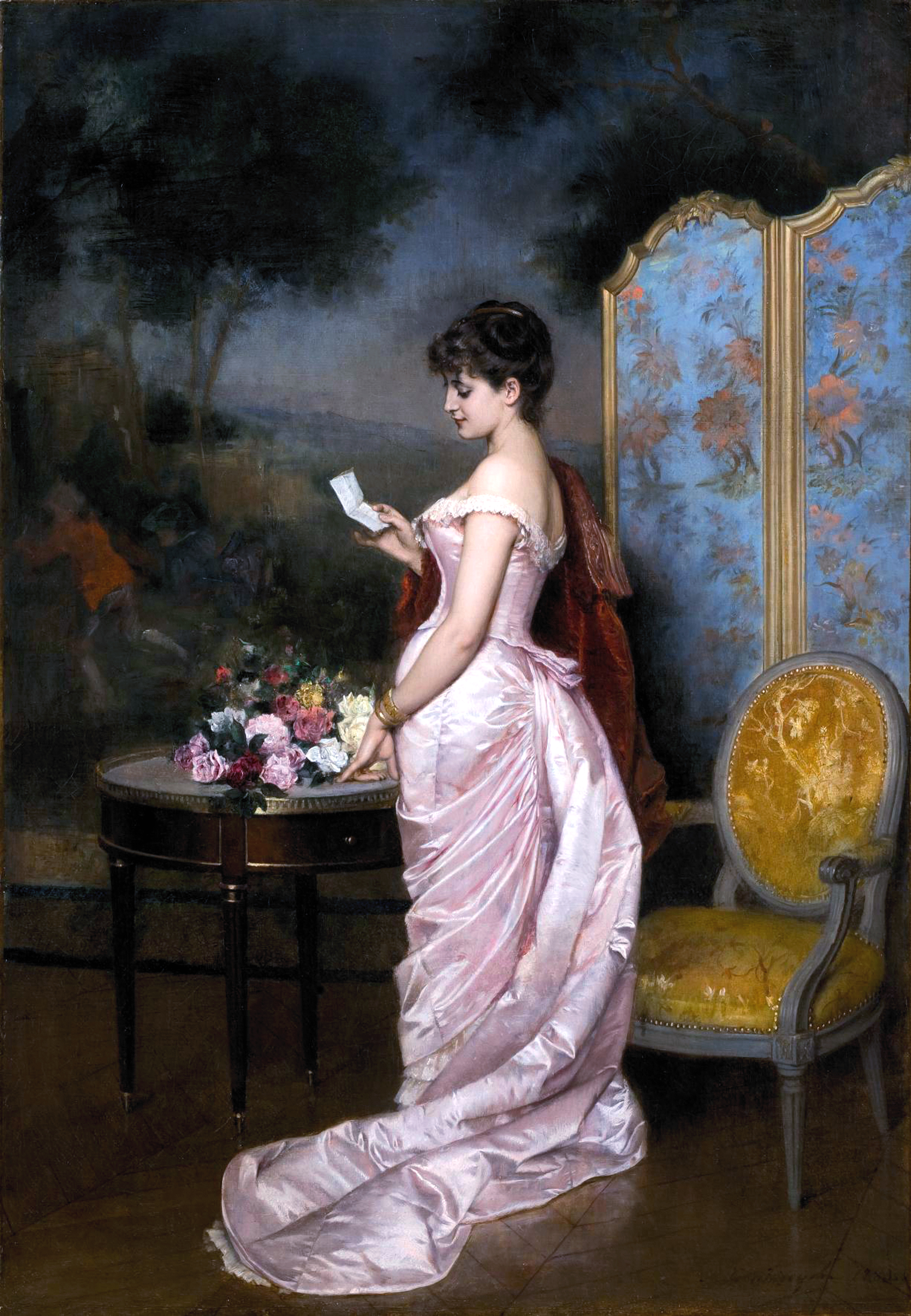
The Love Letter, 1883

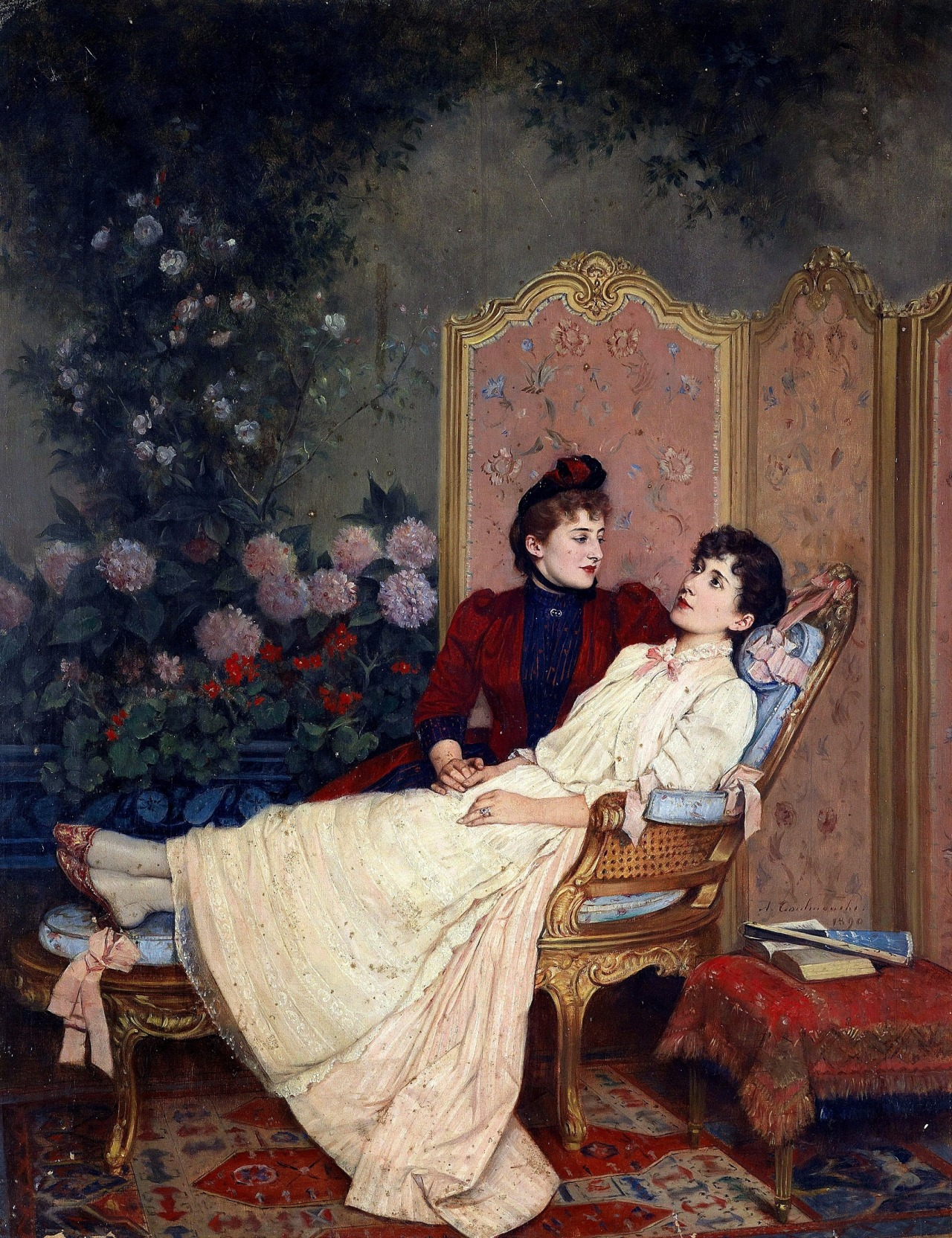
Rêveries, 1890
