= Marie Toulmouche =

French painter (7 June 1836–1917)

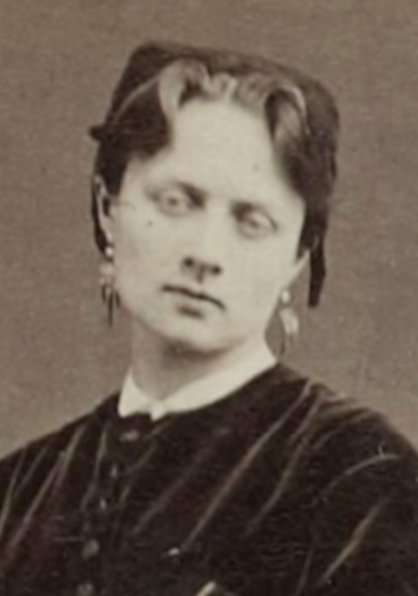
- Born: Marie Lecadre; 7 June 1836; Nantes, Kingdom of France (modern day France)
- Died: 1917 (aged 80–81)
- Occupations: Oil painter; water-colourist; pastellist
- Known for: Still lifes and floral compositions

Marie Toulmouche, (née Lecadre; 1836–1917) was a French oil painter, water-colourist and pastellist known for her still lifes and floral compositions. She hosted a literary and artistic salon at her residence in La Chapelle-Launay and was a relative of Claude Monet.

== Early life and family ==
Marie Lecadre was born in Nantes on 7th June 1836 to Alphonse Henri Lecadre, a magistrate, and Marie Élisabeth Malvina Gigougeux. Part of a wealthy family with strong ties to the arts, Marie spent part of her childhood in Martinique. By her mid-twenties she had gained a reputation in the salons of Nantes as a striking beauty who "played the piano, sang, and recited with perfection."

The extended Lecadre family living around Le Havre included a number of figures close to the Impressionist Claude Monet, who was Marie's first cousin once removed. Her great-aunt Marie-Jeanne Lecadre, an amateur painter, was an early support in Monet's life and encouraged his work as an artist. Marie's cousin by marriage, Jeanne-Marguerite Lecadre, was the subject of his Woman in the Garden.

== Marriage to Auguste Toulmouche ==
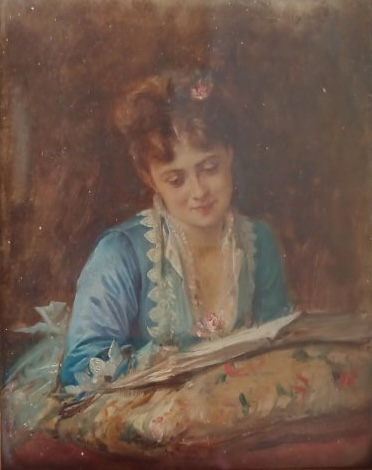
Portrait of Marie Lecadre-Toulmouche by her husband

At 25, Lecadre married Auguste Toulmouche, a genre painter from her native Nantes who was already established in the French art world. The marriage took place in the couple's home town on 3 December 1861, with witnesses including the politician René Waldeck-Rousseau. Marie's profession is listed as propriétaire, or property owner, on their marriage certificate.

The couple settled in Paris, establishing their studio at 70 bis rue Notre-Dame-des-Champs, near the centre of Montparnasse. The property there, which consisted of seven ground-floor workshops and a number of glass-covered walkways, belonged to Auguste's father and was known as the Boîte à Thé (Tea Box), as its exterior was decorated with Chinese ornaments.

During Lecadre-Toulmouche's time at the Boîte à Thé, the complex was a meeting place for artists, writers and intellectuals. Their studio neighbours, who included Gérôme, Schutzenberger, Lauwick, and Brion, hosted regular gatherings attended by a wide range of contemporaries including George Sand and Théophile Gauthier.

After two decades in Montparnasse, the couple relocated to 37 rue de Laval, today rue Victor-Massé, in lower Montmartre, close to the artist neighbourhood of Nouvelle‑Athènes. At their various studios, Lecadre-Toulmouche produced works in pastels, watercolours, and oils, and also posed as a model for her husband on a number of occasions.

== The Blanche-Couronne estate ==
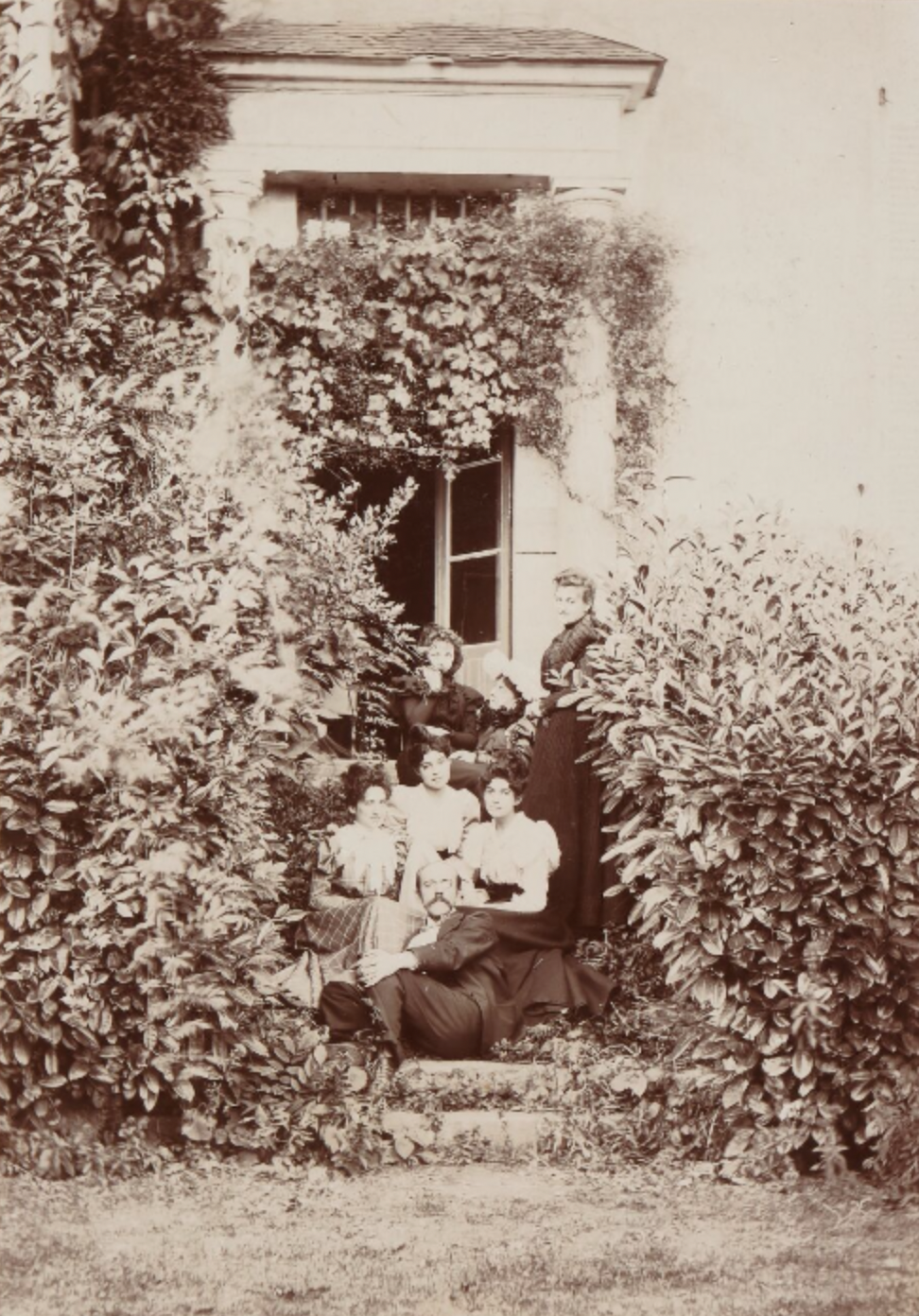
Marie Lecadre-Toulmouche (in mourning) at Blanche-Couronne with others including the poet Henri de Régnier

After their marriage, the couple frequently spent time at the Blanche‑Couronne estate, a former Benedictine abbey situated in the countryside near Nantes. Originally purchased by Marie's father in the spring of 1841, the estate in La Chapelle-Launey became the Lecadres’ country residence. After her father's death, Marie and her two brothers, Jacques‑Edmond‑Marie Lecadre and Alphonse‑Eugène Lecadre, inherited the property, with Marie becoming its sole owner on August 26, 1871.

The couple refurbished Blanche-Couronne, installing a studio and inviting friends from the Boîte à Thé and elsewhere. The property became the site of an artistic salon led by Marie Lecadre-Toulmouche, hosting figures such as the painters Jules-Élie Delaunay and Auguste Renoir, and the poets Marie de Heredia, José-Maria de Heredia and Henri de Régnier.

In a letter to Leconte de Lisle, José Maria de Heredia described the atmosphere of the Blanche-Couronne estate:

In this charming convent, we live a life even more idle than secluded. Here is a solitude full of charm. The sea air blows gently, softened by the nearby Loire. It is cool and pleasant in the vast rooms, the long corridors, and in a charming cloister whose courtyard is full of flowers and whose arches are festooned with climbing plants that creep up the slates of an old moss-covered roof. What a delightful place to read and compose verses!

—

Several writers who stayed at Blanche-Couronne later drew on it as a model for settings in their literary works. The residence is also closely associated with Élie Delaunay's Portrait of Mme Marie Toulmouche, which features the façade of the abbey.

== Portrait by Élie Delaunay ==
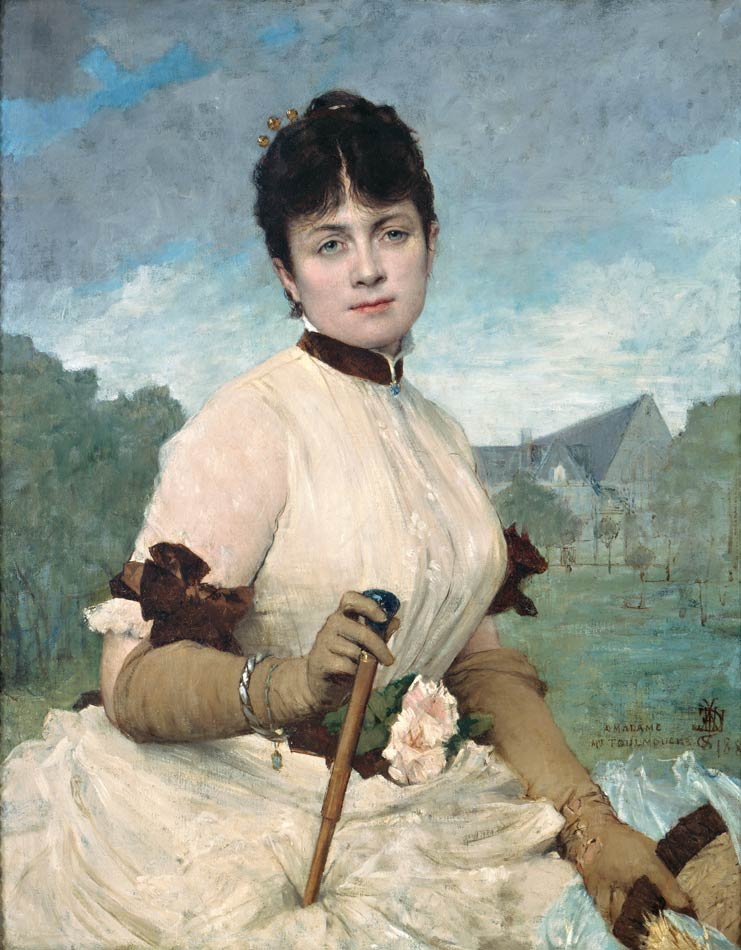
Marie Toulmouche by Jules-Élie Delaunay. Toulmouche's residence Blanche-Couronne is visible in the background.

The painter Delaunay was among the artists who frequented Lecadre‑Toulmouche's salon, first arriving in the early 1870s. In addition to decorating the dining room of Blanche-Couronne with frescoes representing the four seasons, Delaunay produced a number of works at the residence, including his 1884 portrait of Marie Lecadre‑Toulmouche. In the portrait, Lecadre-Toulmouche is shown in front of the house, alluding to her role as a hostess and the social function of the residence.

Initially, Auguste Toulmouche, had intended to bequeath the portrait to the Musée de Nantes. However, he changed his mind in anger after a jury at a Nantes exhibition awarded the medal of honour to Luc-Olivier Merson instead of to Delaunay. Toulmouche reportedly tore up his will in protest, suggesting that if Marie agreed, it should be left to the Louvre instead.

After Lecadre-Toulmouche's death in 1917, the Musée de Nantes ultimately bought the painting for a reduced price, as some of her heirs agreed to donate the paintings while others refused.

== Works ==
Marie Toulmouche specialised in still lifes and floral paintings executed in oil, watercolour and pastel. Her works were exhibited at the Salon in Nantes as well as the Salon des Beaux‑Arts in Paris. Her painting Jacinthes received honourable mention at the 1892 Salon.

Her works include:

- Apples / Pommes d'api (1886)
- Autumn Violets, pastel / Violettes d'automne (1888)
- Basket of Flowers / Pannier de fleurs (1888)
- Fresh Produce / Primeurs (1888)
- Tulips, pastel / Tulipes (1888)
- Autumn Flowers / Fleurs d'automne (1889)
- Bramble Flowers / Fleurs de Ronce (1890)
- Spring / Printemps (1890)
- Hyacinths / Jacinthes (1892)
