= Charles Gleyre =

Swiss artist

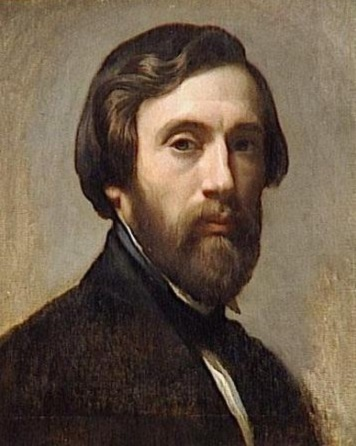
- Self-portrait, 1841 (Palace of Versailles)
- Born: 2 May 1806; Chevilly, Switzerland
- Died: 5 May 1874 (aged 68); Paris, France
- Known for: oil painting

Marc Gabriel Charles Gleyre (2 May 1806 – 5 May 1874), was a Swiss artist who was a resident in France from an early age. He took over the studio of Paul Delaroche in 1843 and taught a number of younger artists who became prominent, including Henry-Lionel Brioux, Jean-Léon Gérôme, George du Maurier, Claude Monet, Pierre-Auguste Renoir, Louis-Frédéric Schützenberger, Alfred Sisley, Auguste Toulmouche, and James McNeill Whistler.

== Life ==
Gleyre was born in Chevilly, near Lausanne. His parents died when he was eight or nine years old, and he was brought up by an uncle in Lyon, France, who sent him to the city's industrial school. He began his formal artistic education in Lyon under Bonnefond, before moving to Paris, where he enrolled at the École des Beaux-Arts under Hersent. He also attended the Académie Suisse and studied watercolour technique in the studio of Richard Parkes Bonington. He then went to Italy, where he became acquainted with Horace Vernet and Louis Léopold Robert.

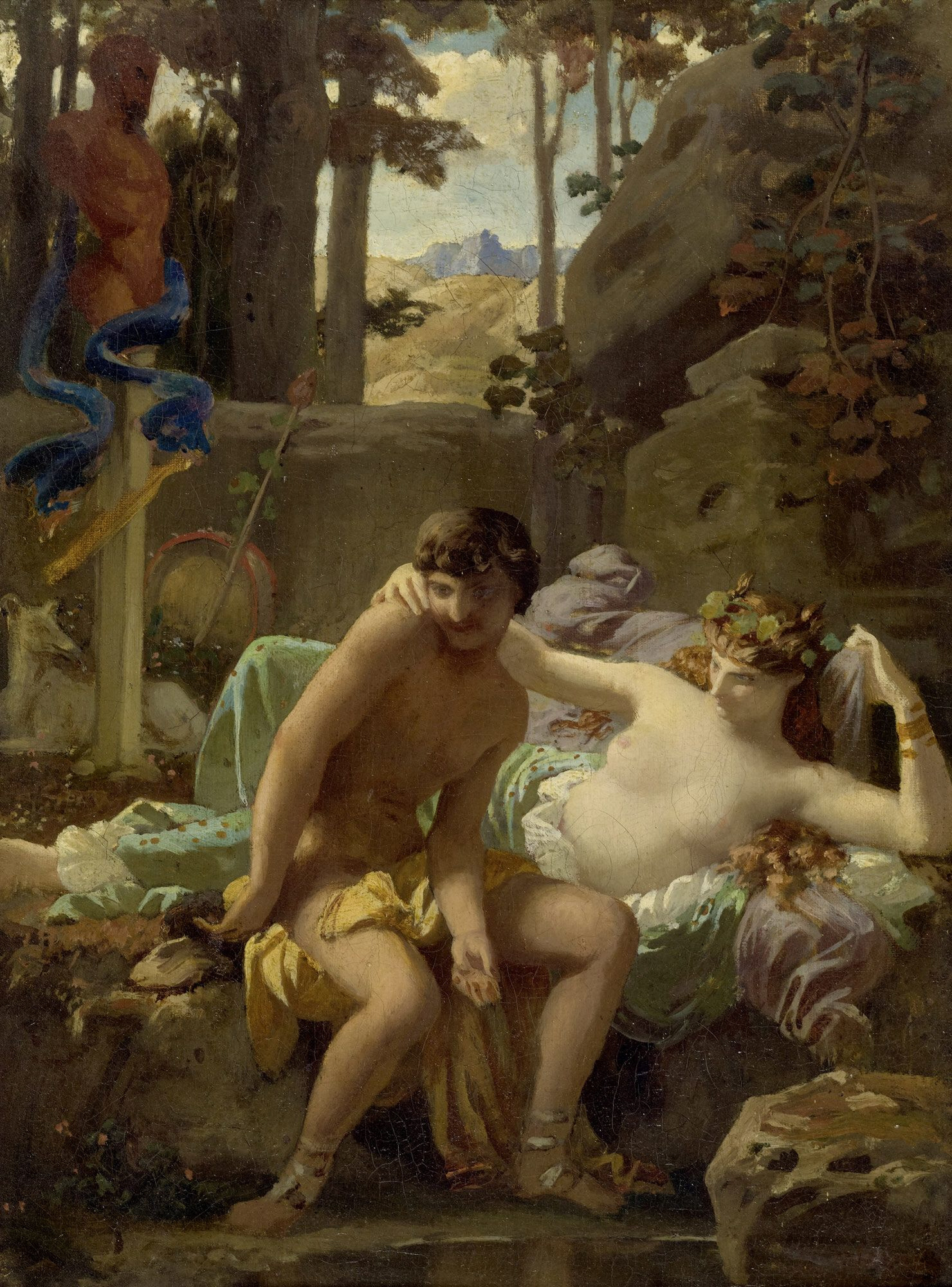
Cléonis et Cydippe, 1843 (collection not known)

It was through Vernet's recommendation that he was chosen by the American traveller John Lowell Jr. to accompany him on his journeys round the eastern Mediterranean, recording the scenes and ethnographic subjects they met with. They left Italy in spring 1834 and visited Greece, Turkey and Egypt, where they remained together until November 1835, when Lowell left for India. Gleyre continued his travels around Egypt and Syria, not returning to France until 1838. He returned to Lyons in shattered health, having been attacked with ophthalmia, or inflammation of the eye, in Cairo, and struck down by fever in Lebanon.

On his recovery he proceeded to Paris and, establishing a modest studio in the rue de Université, began carefully to work out the ideas which had been slowly shaping themselves in his mind. Mention is made of two decorative panels Diana leaving the Bath, and a Young Nubian as almost the first fruits of his genius; but these did not attract public attention until much later, and the painting by which he practically opened his artistic career was the Apocalyptic Vision of St John, sent to the Salon of 1840. This was followed in 1843 by Evening, which received a medal of the second class, and afterwards became widely popular under the title Lost Illusions. It depicts a poet seated on the bank of a river, with his head drooping and a wearied posture, letting his lyre slip from a careless hand, and gazing sadly at a bright company of maidens whose song slowly fades from his ear as their boat is borne slowly from his sight.

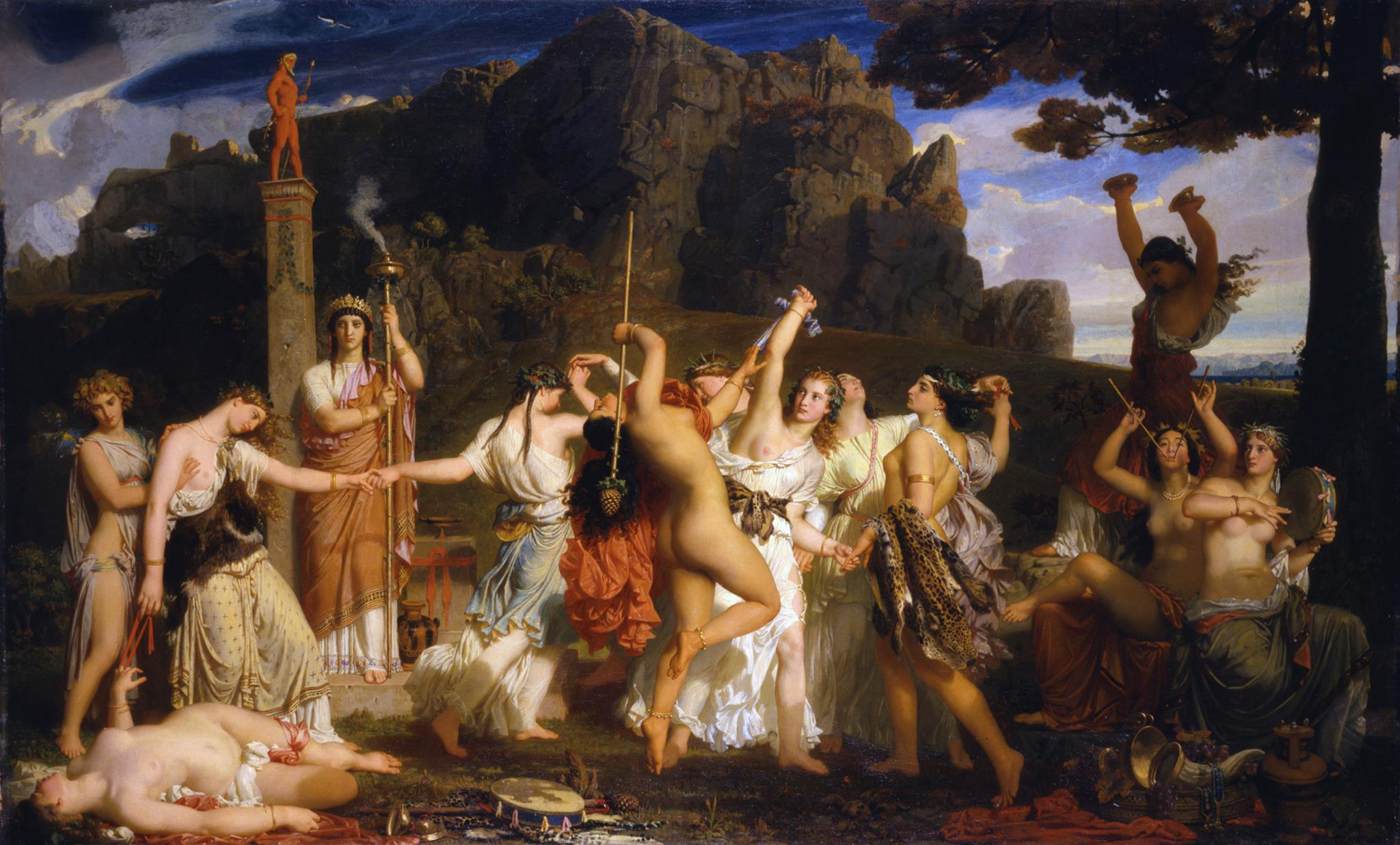
La Danse des bacchantes, 1849 (Cantonal Museum of Fine Arts)

In spite of the success of these first ventures, Gleyre retired from public competition, and spent the rest of his life in quiet devotion to his artistic ideals, neither seeking the easy applause of the crowd, nor turning his art into a means of aggrandizement and wealth. After 1845, when he exhibited the Separation of the Apostles, he contributed nothing to the Salon except the La Dance des bacchantes in 1849. Yet he worked steadily and was productive. He had an "infinite capacity of taking pains", and when asked by what method he attained to such marvelous perfection of workmanship, he would reply, "En y pensant toujours". Many years often intervened between the first conception of a piece and its embodiment, and years not infrequently between the first and the final stage of the embodiment itself. A landscape was apparently finished; even his fellow artists would consider it done; Gleyre alone was conscious that he had not "found his sky".

Gleyre became influential as a teacher, taking over the studio of Paul Delaroche – then the leading private teaching atelier in Paris – in 1843. His students included Jean-Léon Gérôme, Jean-Louis Hamon, Auguste Toulmouche, Whistler and several of the Impressionists: Monet, Renoir, Sisley, and Bazille. He did not charge his students a fee, although he expected them to contribute towards the rent and the payment of models. They were also given a say in the running of the school.

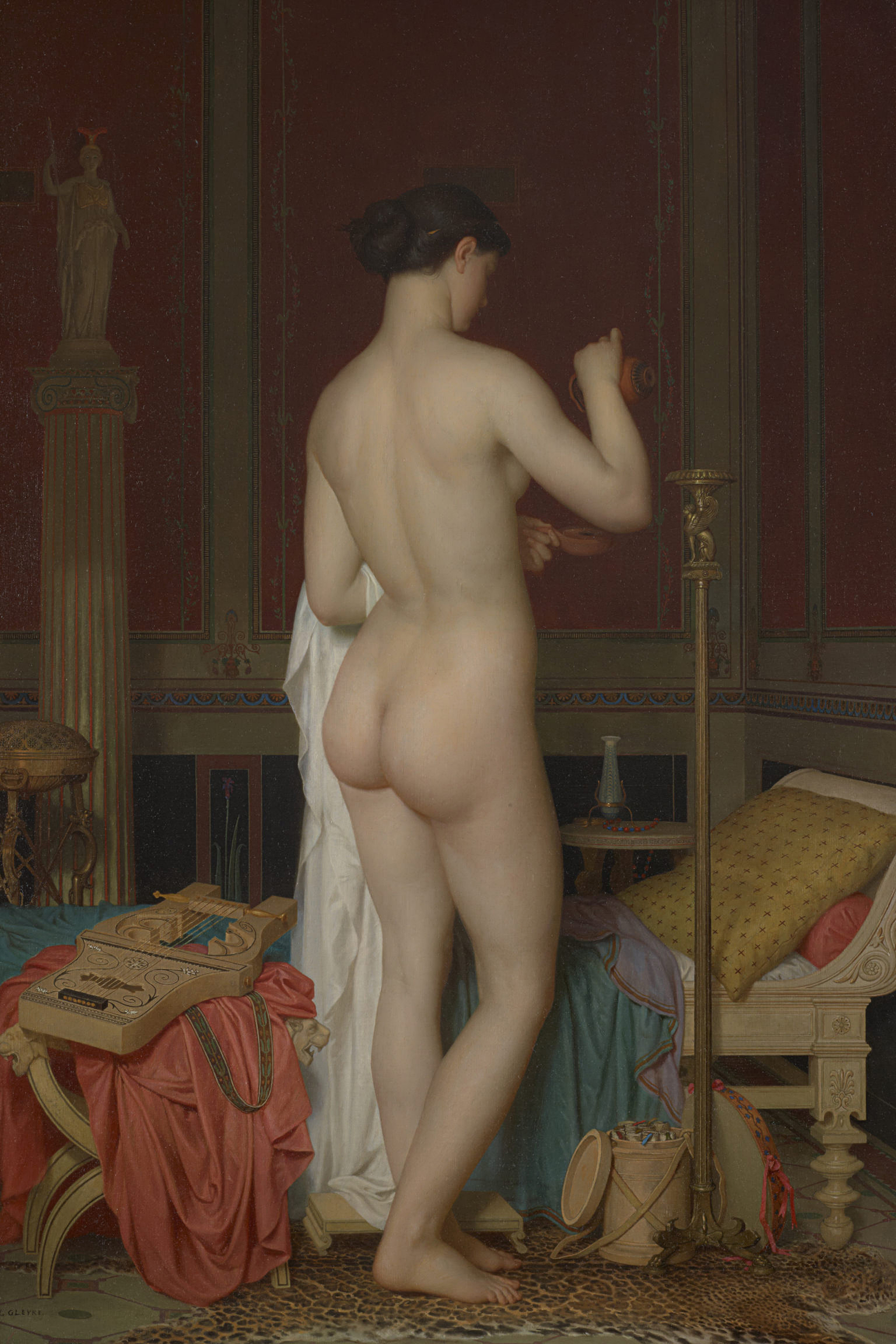
Sappho, 1867 (Cantonal Museum of Fine Arts)

Though he lived in almost complete retirement from public life, he took a keen interest in politics, and was a voracious reader of political journals. For a time, under Louis Philippe, his studio had been the rendezvous of a sort of liberal club. To the last—amid all the disasters that befell his country—he was hopeful of the future, "la raison finira bien par avoir raison". It was while on a visit to the Retrospective Exhibition, opened on behalf of the exiles from Alsace and Lorraine, that he died suddenly on 5 May 1874. He had never married.

He left unfinished the Earthly Paradise, a picture, which Taine described as "a dream of innocence, of happiness and of beauty—Adam and Eve standing in the sublime and joyous landscape of a paradise enclosed in mountains", a worthy counterpart to Evening. His other works include Deluge, which represents two angels speeding above the desolate earth from which the destroying waters have just begun to retire, leaving visible behind them the ruin they have wrought; the Battle of the Lemanus, a piece of elaborate design, crowded but not encumbered with figures, and giving fine expression to the movements of the various bands of combatants and fugitives; the Prodigal Son, in which the artist has ventured to add to the parable the new element of mother's love, greeting the repentant youth with a welcome that shows that the mother's heart thinks less of the repentance than of the return; Ruth and Boaz; Ulysses and Nausicaa; Hercules at the Feet of Omphale; the Young Athenian, or, as it is popularly called, Sappho; Minerva and the Nymphs; Venus and Adonis; Daphnis and Chloë; and Love and the Parcae. He also left a considerable number of drawings and watercolours, and a number of portraits, among which is the sad face of Heinrich Heine, engraved in the Revue des deux mondes for April 1852. In Clement's catalogue of his works there are 683 entries, including sketches and studies.

== Other selected works ==
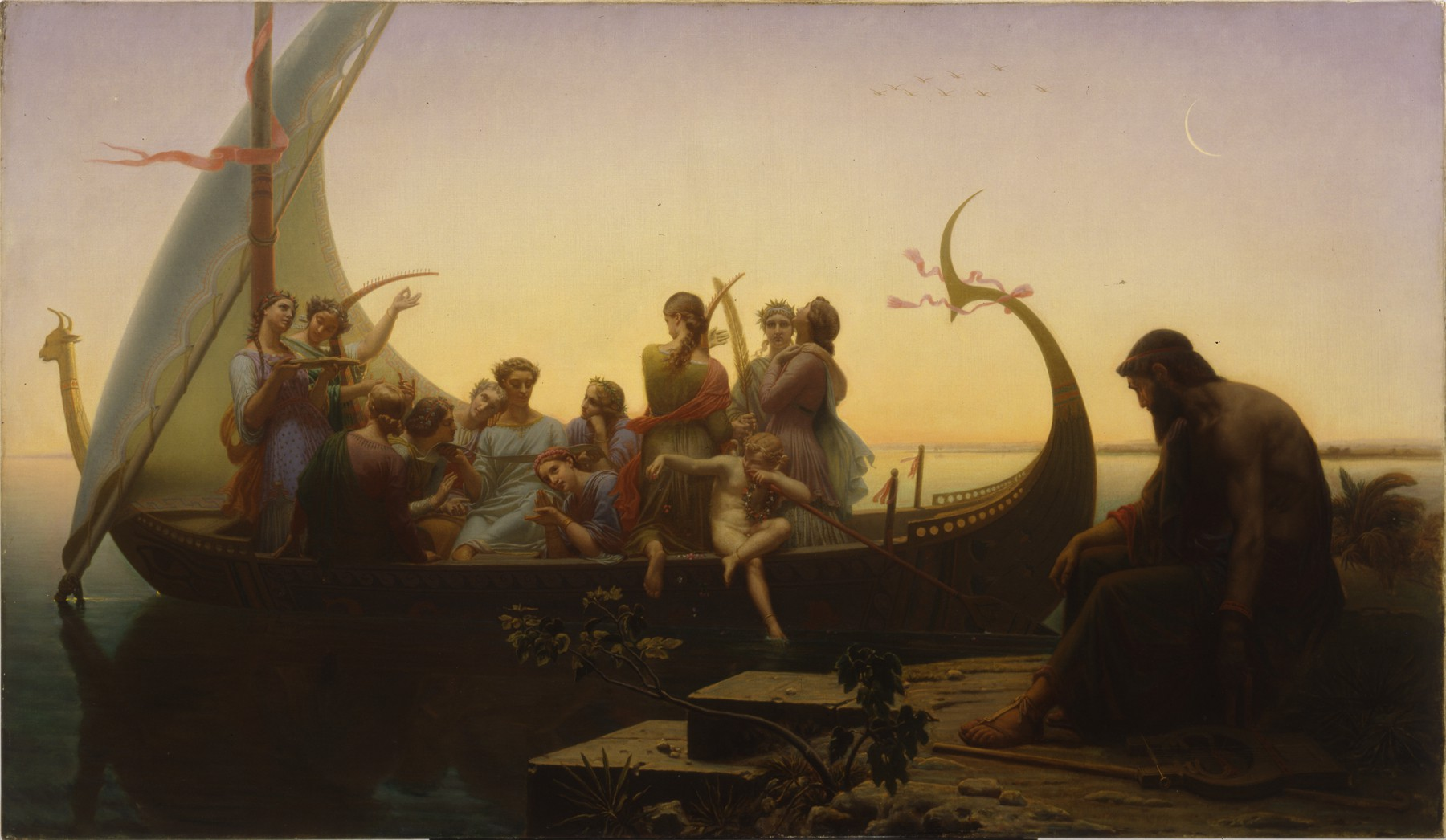
Lost Illusions

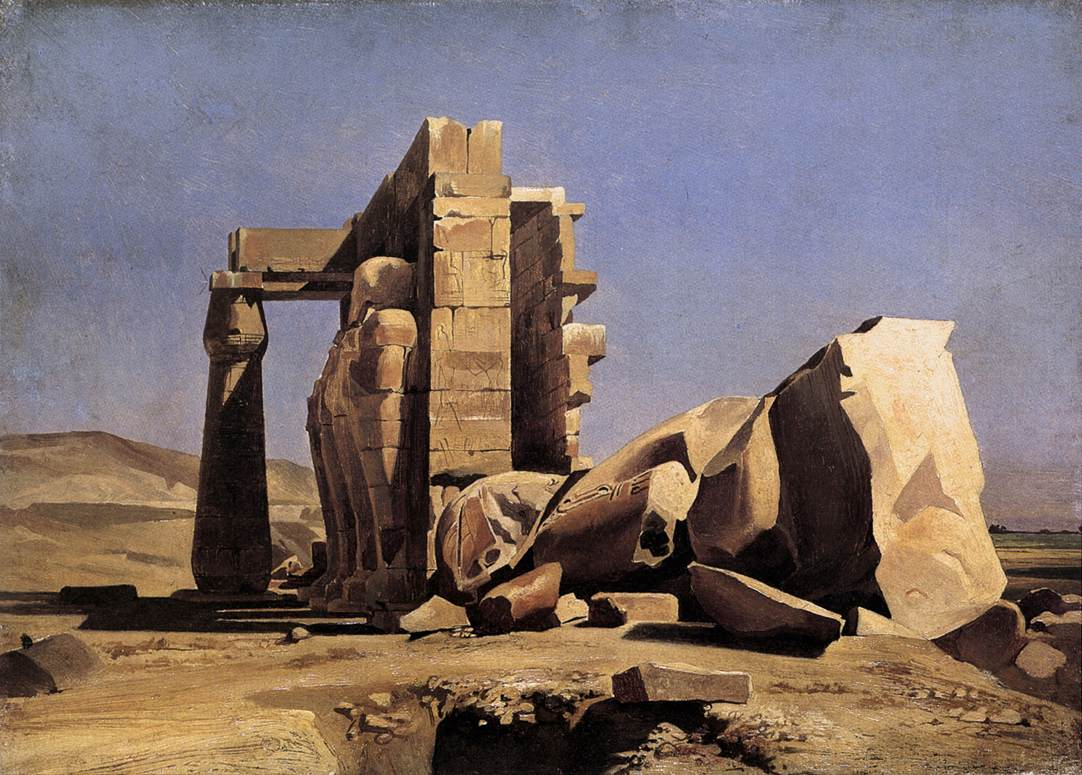
Egyptian Temple

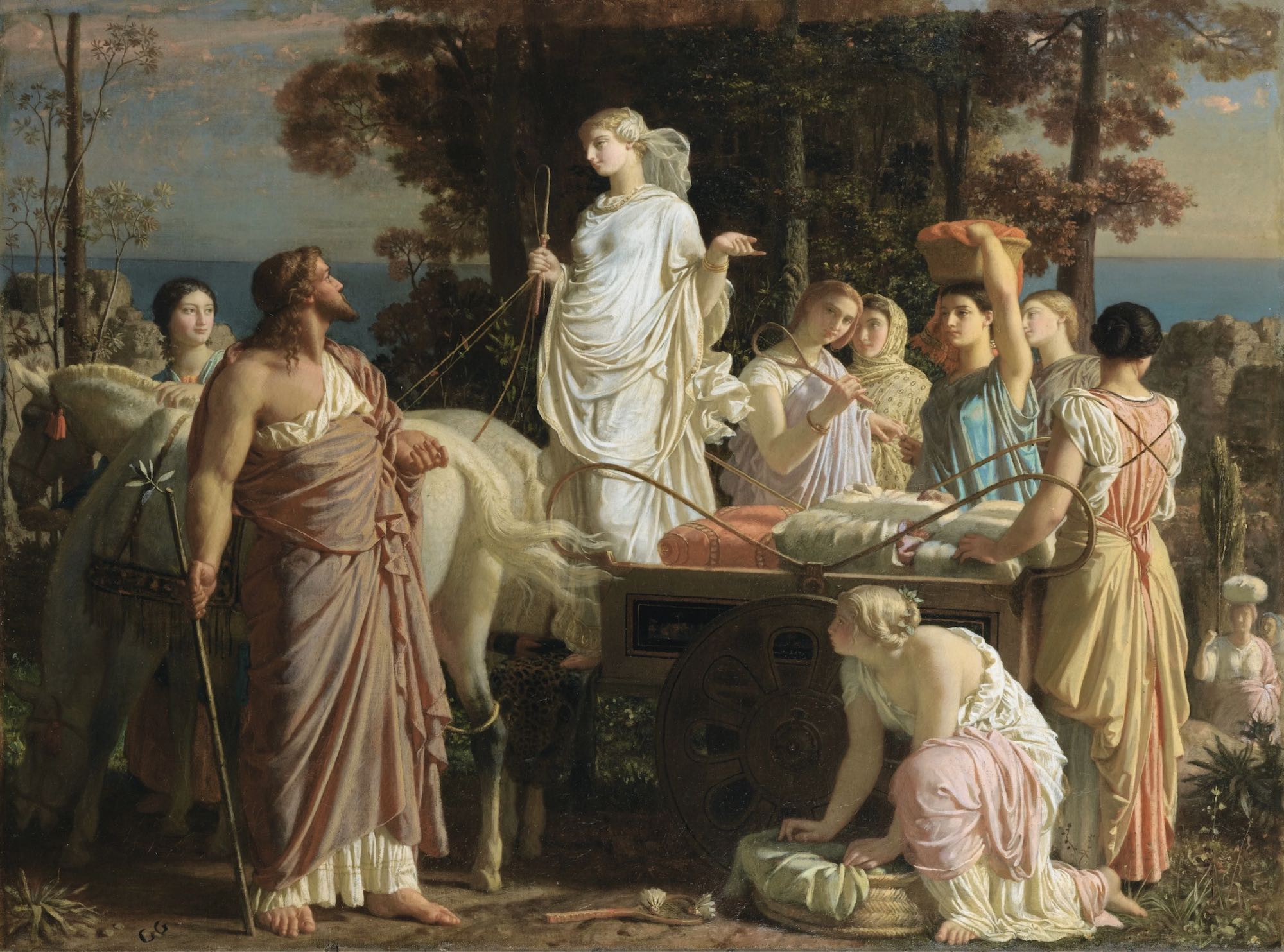
Ulysses and Nausicaa

== Sources ==
- Fritz Berthoud in Bibliothèque universelle de Geneve (1874);
- Albert de Montet, Dict. biographique des Genevois et des Vaudois (1877);
- Vie de Charles Gleyre (1877), written by his friend, Charles Clement, and illustrated by 30 plates from his works in Hersent's studio, in the Académie Suisse, and in the galleries of the Louvre.
