= Louis Lamothe =

French painter

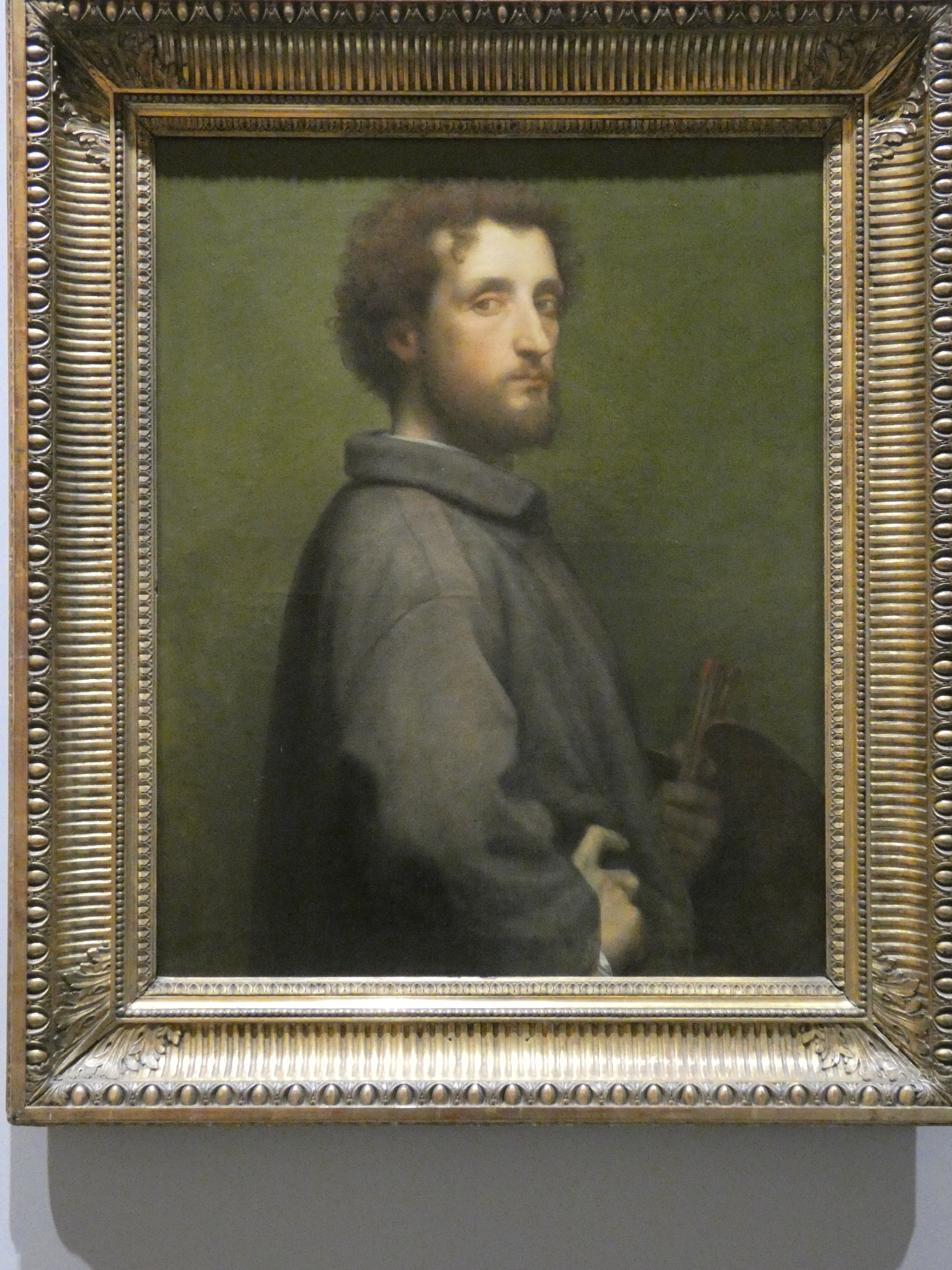
Self-portrait (1859), Museum of Fine Arts of Lyon

Louis Lamothe (1822–1869) was a French academic artist born in Lyon. He is remembered today primarily as the teacher of several more renowned artists, notably Edgar Degas, Elie Delaunay, Henry Lerolle, Henri Regnault, and James Tissot.

Lamothe was a pupil of Jean Auguste Dominique Ingres and Jean-Hippolyte Flandrin. Art historian Jean Sutherland Boggs describes him as a history painter "in a pious Christian tradition", and likens his "correct, moral, bourgeois, and even sanctimonious portraits" to those of Flandrin, whom Lamothe assisted in the decoration of the church of St-Martin-d'Ainay in 1855.
