= Alfred Moul =

Alfred Moul (c. 1852 – 18 January 1924) was a composer, pianist, agent, critic, and impresario. His origins are uncertain, but there is some evidence that he was from Australia. He studied music in London under Julius Benedict, after which he travelled to Australia in 1876. He performed and composed, and from mid-1880 was music critic of two Melbourne papers.

In 1883 Moul returned to England, where he became managing director of the Alhambra Theatre in London. For Queen Victoria's diamond jubilee in 1897 he commissioned Arthur Sullivan's ballet Victoria and Merrie England. On occasion he would compose additional music for the shows he presented at the Alhambra, and he contributed to productions at other theatres, such as the London versions of Frédéric Toulmouche's The Wedding Eve (1892) and Charles Lecocq's Incognita (also 1892). For such compositions he used the pen name "Yvolde". For the Alhambra, known for its popular ballets, he wrote the score of one of the most successful, Psyche (1909).

Moul remained closely connected with the Alhambra for many years, holding at various times the post of managing director or chairman (and both concurrently from 1906 to 1911). He was also prominent in the campaign to secure authors' and composers' intellectual property rights. He was honoured by the French government for his efforts in this respect. During the 1890s Moul was an artists' agent for opera, drama and concerts. Among those whose careers he fostered were Landon Ronald, May Yohé and Agnes Huntington. He was also active in the early British film industry, and in 1896 directed a comedy, The Soldier's Courtship.

Moul died in London, leaving a widow but no children.

== Sources ==
- Clark, Walter Aaron (2007). Isaac Albéniz: Portrait of a Romantic. Oxford and New York: Oxford University Press. ISBN 978-0-19-925052-3.
