= Henry Lerolle =

French painter (1848–1929)

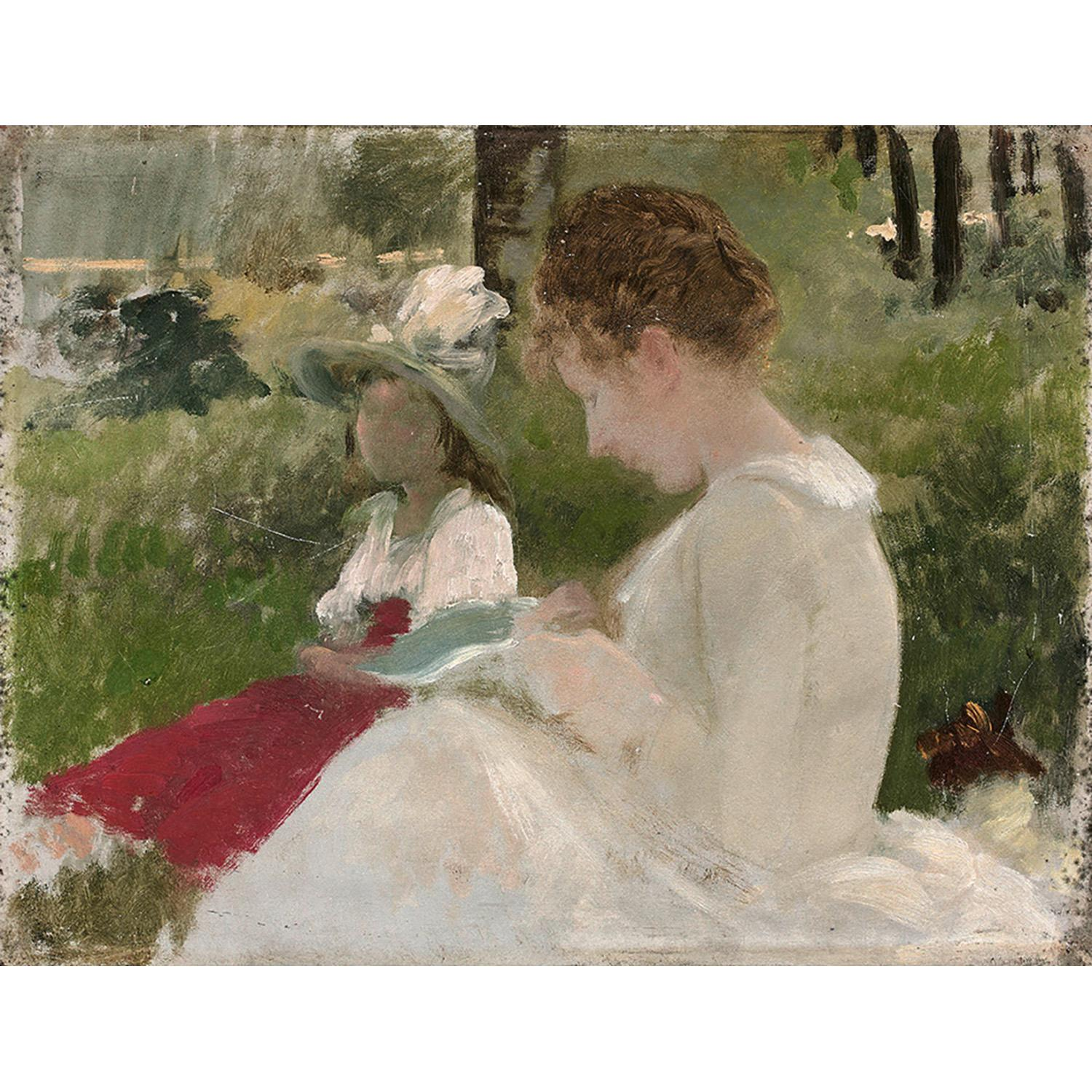
Madeleine and daughter Christine Lerolle by H. Lerolle

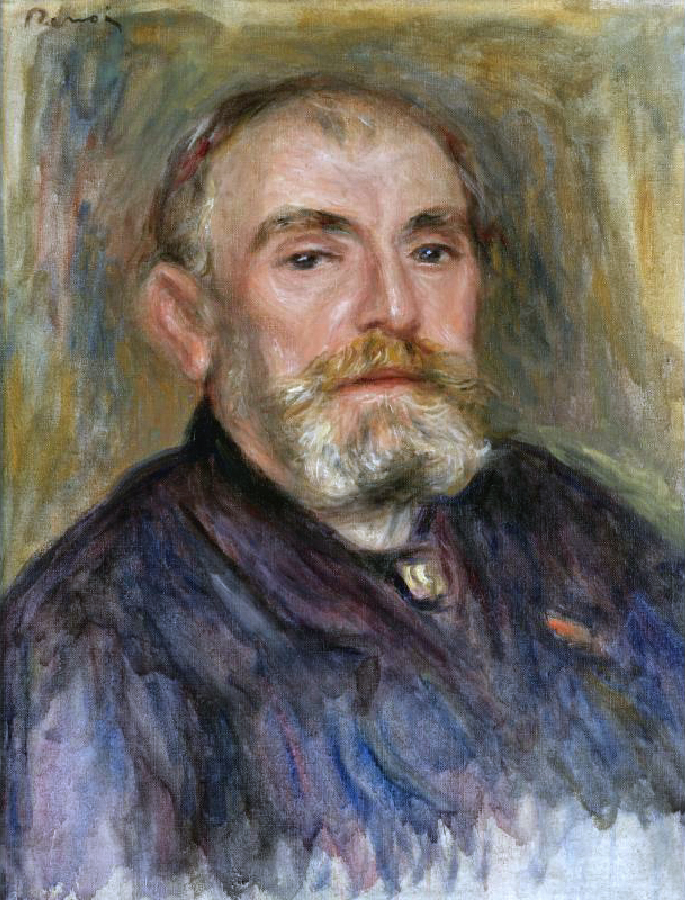
Henry Lerolle (1895) by Pierre-Auguste Renoir

Henry Lerolle (3 October 1848 – 22 April 1929) was a French painter, art collector and patron, born in Paris. He studied at Académie Suisse and in the studio of Louis Lamothe.

His work was exhibited at the Paris Salon in 1868, 1885, and 1895. In 1889 Lerolle painted the murals The Crowning of Science and The Teaching of Science in the Hôtel de Ville, Paris. He painted Flight into Egypt in the Sorbonne, and also did works in Schola Cantorum (the establishment of which he was involved), and the church of St. Martin des Champs, both in Paris. Lerolle was made a Chevalier, Légion d'honneur in 1889.

Lerolle's paintings are in the collections of the Metropolitan Museum of Art, the Museum of Fine Arts, Boston, the Musée d'Orsay and the Fine Arts Museum of San Francisco.

== Patronage ==
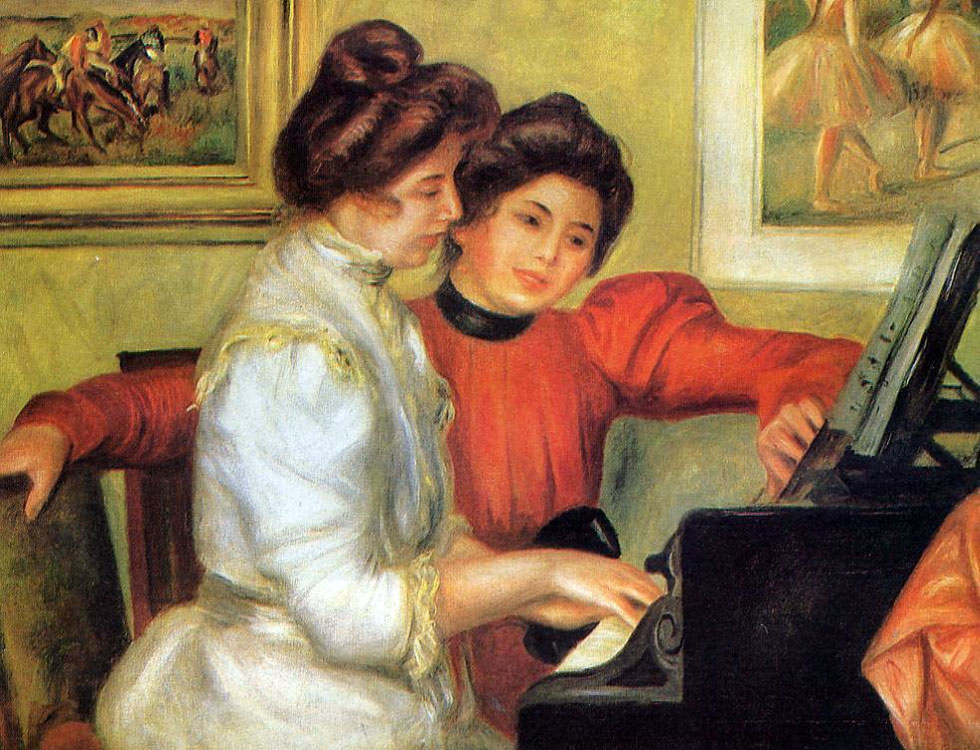
Pierre-Auguste Renoir, Yvonne et Christine Lerolle au piano, 1897–1898, Musee de l'Orangerie, Paris, Lerolle's daughters, Yvonne and Christine

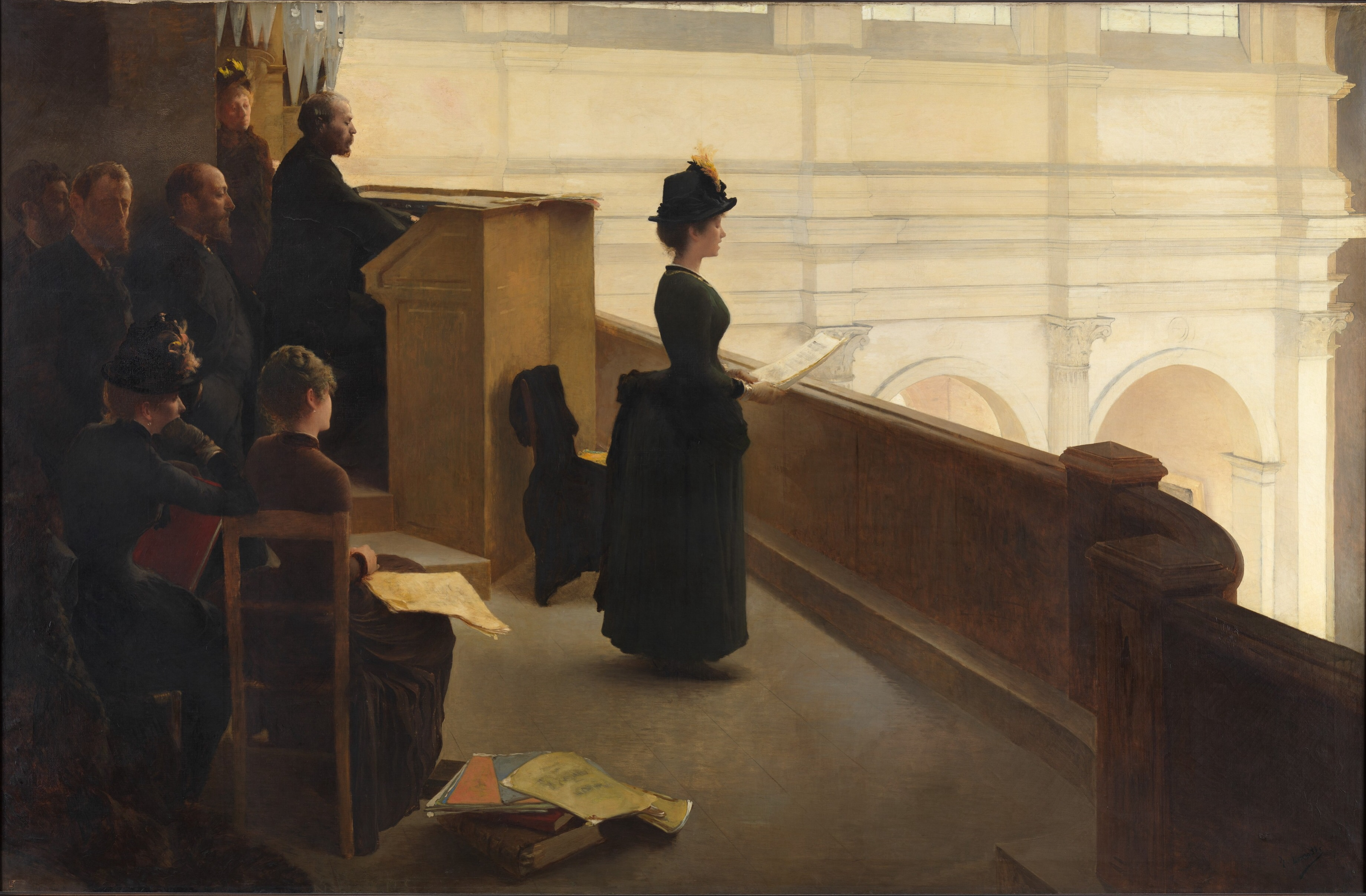
The Organ Rehearsal (1887)

Lerolle owned several canvases by Maurice Denis including Catholic Mystery, and is considered to be Denis's first important patron. In fact, Denis claimed that Lerolle "discovered him." In 1892 Lerolle commissioned Denis to paint a ceiling mural for his home entitled "L'Echelle dans le Feuillage" ("Ladder in the Foliage"). Additionally, Lerolle was a friend and patron to Degas and Renoir, the latter of whom painted several portraits of Lerolle's daughters and of Lerolle himself. Lerolle also owned works by Fantin-Latour (who painted Lerolle's wife, Madeleine Escudier), Corot, Gauguin, and others.

Madame Lerolle's sister, Jeanne, was married to the composer Ernest Chausson and the Lerolle home, at 20, avenue Duquesne was a meeting place not only for artists, but also musicians of the day including Vincent d'Indy, Claude Debussy and Paul Dukas. Having met via Lerolle, Chausson also commissioned works by Maurice Denis. Lerolle was also a violinist and composer.

Debussy dedicated several piano works to Lerolle's daughter Yvonne (b. 1877) including three Images in 1894. Yvonne Lerolle was a friend to Julie Manet, daughter of the painter Berthe Morisot.

== See also ==
- Les Nabis

== External links to works by Lerolle ==
- The Organ Rehearsal at The Metropolitan Museum of Art.
- By the Riverside at Museum of Fine Arts, Boston
- Portrait of the Artist's Mother at Musée d'Orsay
- Après le bain at Musée d'Orsay
