= The Reluctant Bride =

Painting by Auguste Toulmouche

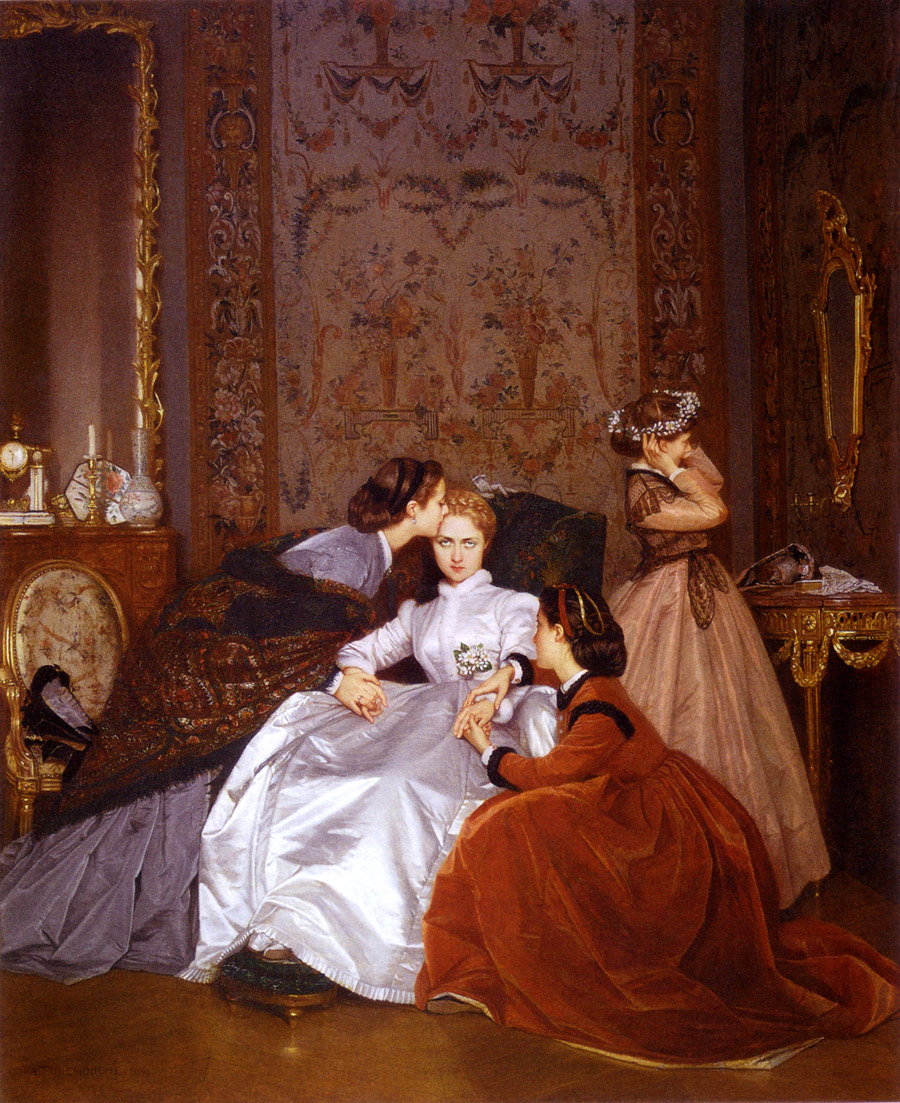
The Reluctant Fiancée, Auguste Toulmouche, 1866

The Reluctant Bride (French: La Fiancée Hésitante, sometimes translated as 'The Hesitant Fiancée' or 'The Hesitant Betrothed') is an 1866 oil painting by Auguste Toulmouche. The painting measures 65 cm × 54 cm (26 in × 21 in) and is signed and dated "A. Toulmouche / 1866". The painting is currently owned by a private collector.

Toulmouche had found success as a genre painter in an Academic style by 1866, winning medals at the Paris Salon for paintings depicting fashionable women in luxurious interiors, described by Émile Zola as "Toulmouche's delicious dolls" (délicieuses poupées de Toulmouche).

Departing from Toulmouche's usual paintings of a single woman, this work is a more complicated composition showing a group of women in an opulently decorated room. The figures congregate in the lower half of the canvas, with the upper half devoted to the flamboyantly decorated room and its gilded furniture. The scene is set shortly before the wedding of the central young woman, waiting in a parlour or drawing room with her bridesmaids. The woman in the centre is seated in a flowing white satin silk dress with high collar trimmed with white fur. She stares out at the viewer, with an ambivalent expression that has attracted various interpretations ranging from anger to resignation to her arranged marriage. She is attended by two women of similar age: the woman to the left in a lavender velvet gown with a patterned shawl bends to kiss her forehead, while the woman to the right in burnt orange velvet gown is crouching to hold her left hand. A girl stands to the right, looking in a mirror as she tries on a bridal headdress of orange blossom, echoing the central figure's bouquet.

The painting was put up for sale at Christie's in New York in October 1990, and again at Sotheby's in New York in April and October 2005, and is held in a private collection. The Sotheby's auction catalogue suggests it may have been exhibited in Paris at the 1866 Salon and the 1867 Exposition Universelle.

Not well known at the time of its creation nor in more recent times, the work came to public attention in late 2023 when it was used to express female anger on TikTok: a version accompanied by excerpts of the Dies Irae from Verdi's Requiem was quickly viewed over 6 million times.
