= Lost Illusions (painting) =

Painting by Charles Gleyre and Leon Dussart

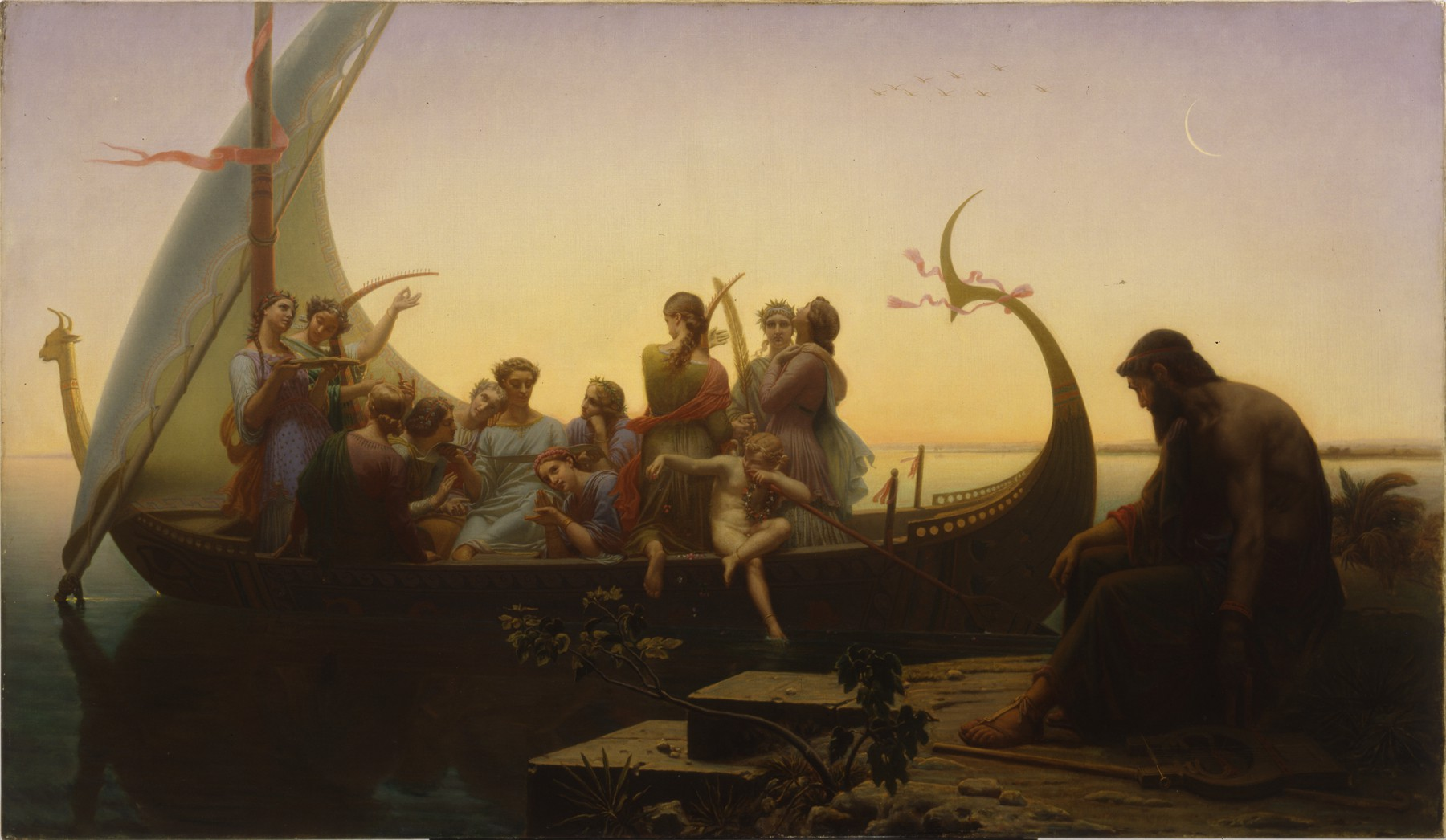
- Artist: Charles Gleyre
- Year: between 1865 and 1867
- Medium: Oil on canvas
- Dimensions: 86.5 cm × 150.5 cm (34.1 in × 59.3 in)
- Location: Louvre Museum; Paris

Lost Illusions (French: Illusions Perdues) is a painting by Charles Gleyre and his student Leon Dussart, commissioned by William Thompson Walters in 1865.

== History ==
Charles Gleyre was known as an artist of classic methods but romantic tastes who often modified heroism into idyllic scenes. However, in execution he was not considered romantic, due to his use of pale colors, his delicate drawing style, and uncertain light. At the 1843 Salon in Paris, Gleyre received praise for The Evening. In 1865 William T. Walters would commission a replica of the painting which was completed by Gleyre and Dussart and is now also known as Lost Illusions.

== Composition ==
Lost Illusions depicts a vision Gleyre experienced one evening while on the banks of the Nile. It represents a despondent scene and uses softened tones. In the scene, an aging poet watches as a mysterious "bark" drifts away with his youthful illusions. The illusions are represented by maidens playing instruments and a cupid scattering flowers.

== Off the Wall ==
Lost Illusions is featured in Off the Wall, an open-air exhibition on the streets of Baltimore, Maryland. A reproduction of the painting, the original of which is part of the Walters Art Museum collection, was displayed through January 2014 in O'Donnell Square. The National Gallery in London began the concept of bringing art out of doors in 2007 and the Detroit Institute of Arts introduced the concept in the United States. The Off the Wall reproductions of the Walters' paintings are on weather-resistant vinyl and include a description of the painting and a QR code for smart phones.
