= Frédéric Toulmouche =

French composer

Frédéric-Michel Toulmouche (4 August 1850 – 23 February 1909) was a French composer, who specialised in light theatrical music for small theatres.

== Biography ==
Toulmouche was born in Nantes, in a well-to-do family counting several artists (the painter Auguste Toulmouche was his cousin). After his studies at the Nantes Lycée, he went to Paris to study with Victor Massé at the Conservatoire de Paris. He became known as a composer of opéras comiques and opérettes, the best known of which were La veillée des noces, Mademoiselle ma femme, La perle du Cantal, La Saint-Valentin and Tante Agnes. In the latter part of his career Toulmouche composed ballet scores for French music-halls, and was the chef de chant (vocal coach), for the Opéra-Comique, Paris.

Little of Toulmouche's music was given abroad. His Le moûtier de Saint-Guignolet (Brussels, 1885, revised 1888) was performed in an English adaptation as The Wedding Eve as the opening production of the Trafalgar Square Theatre, London, in 1892. The Musical Times commented that it was prudent of the management to commission Ernest Ford and "Yvolde" (Alfred Moul) to strengthen Toulmouche's score.

In 1908, Toulmouche was struck by a brain haemorrhage. His last works (La môme Flora and Chez la somnambule) were finished in collaboration with his son, Eddy Toulmouche. Actually Eddy Toulmouche (aka Edy Toulmouche) is the artist name of his step-son, Frédéric Louis de Jonghe (26 September 1886 Nantes –23 January 1923 Ouistreham), son of his wife, Marie Louise Dureau, and her first husband, the Belgian painter Gustave de Jonghe (1828–1893).

Frédéric Toulmouche died in Paris, aged 58. He was buried at the Paris La Chapelle cemetery on 25 Feb 1909.

== Works ==
Toulmouche's works include:

- Ah! le bon billet, opéra-comique in 1 act, libretto by Bureau, Jattiot and Najac (Renaissance, 1882)
- Le moûtier de St-Guignolet, libretto by Bisson, Jattiot and Bureau (Galeries St-Hubert, Brussels, 1885)
- La veillée des noces, opéra-comique in 3 acts, libretto by Bisson, Jattiot and Bureau (Menus-Plaisirs, 1888)
- La belle au coeur dormant, opérette, libretto by T. Maisonneuve (1892)
- L'âme de la patrie, scène lyrique in 1 act, libretto by L. Bonnemère (St-Brieuc, 1892)
- Mademoiselle ma femme, opérette in 3 acts, libretto by Ordonneau and Pradels (Menus-Plaisirs, 1893)
- La chanson du roi, opéra-comique, libretto by L. Bonnemère (Fougères, 1894)
- La perle du Cantal, opérette in 3 acts, libretto by Ordonneau (Folies-Dramatiques, Paris, 1895)
- La Saint-Valentin, opérette in 3 acts, libretto by Ordonneau and Beissier (Bouffes-Parisiens, 1895)
- Les deux tentations, pantomime in 1 act, libretto by Pradels and Frappa (Nouveau-Théâtre/Casino, 1895)
- Le lézard, opérette in 1 act, libretto by Busnach and Lioret (Scala, 1896)
- Tante Agnes, opérette-bouffe in 2 acts, libretto by Boucheron (Olympia, Paris, 1896)
- Pierrot au hammam, ballet-pantomime in 1 act, libretto by Berto-Graivil (Olympia, 1897)
- Madame Malbrouck, ballet-pantomime in 1 act, libretto by Pradels (Casino, Paris, 1898)
- Le rêve de Madame X, opérette in 1 act, libretto by Lagarde and Montignac (Carillon, Paris, 1899)
- Les trois couleurs, divertissement, libretto by Vrécourt and Arnould (Olympia, 1899)
- Auto-Joujou, opérette, libretto by Félix Puget (Théâtre des Capucines, 1904)
- La môme Flora, opérette in 2 acts, libretto by Ordonneau and Pradels, music by Frédéric and Eddy Toulmouche (Scala, 1908)
- Chez la somnambule, opérette in 1 act, libretto by Bisson, music by Frédéric and Eddy Toulmouche (Théâtre Grévin, 1909)

== Sources ==
- Gutsche-Miller, Sarah (2015). Parisian Music-Hall Ballet 1871–1913. Rochester, N.Y: University of Rochester Press. ISBN 978-1-58046-442-0.
