= La Chapelle-Launay =

La Chapelle-Launay La Chapèll-L'Aunaèy (Gallo) Chapel-ar-Wern (Breton)
- Commune
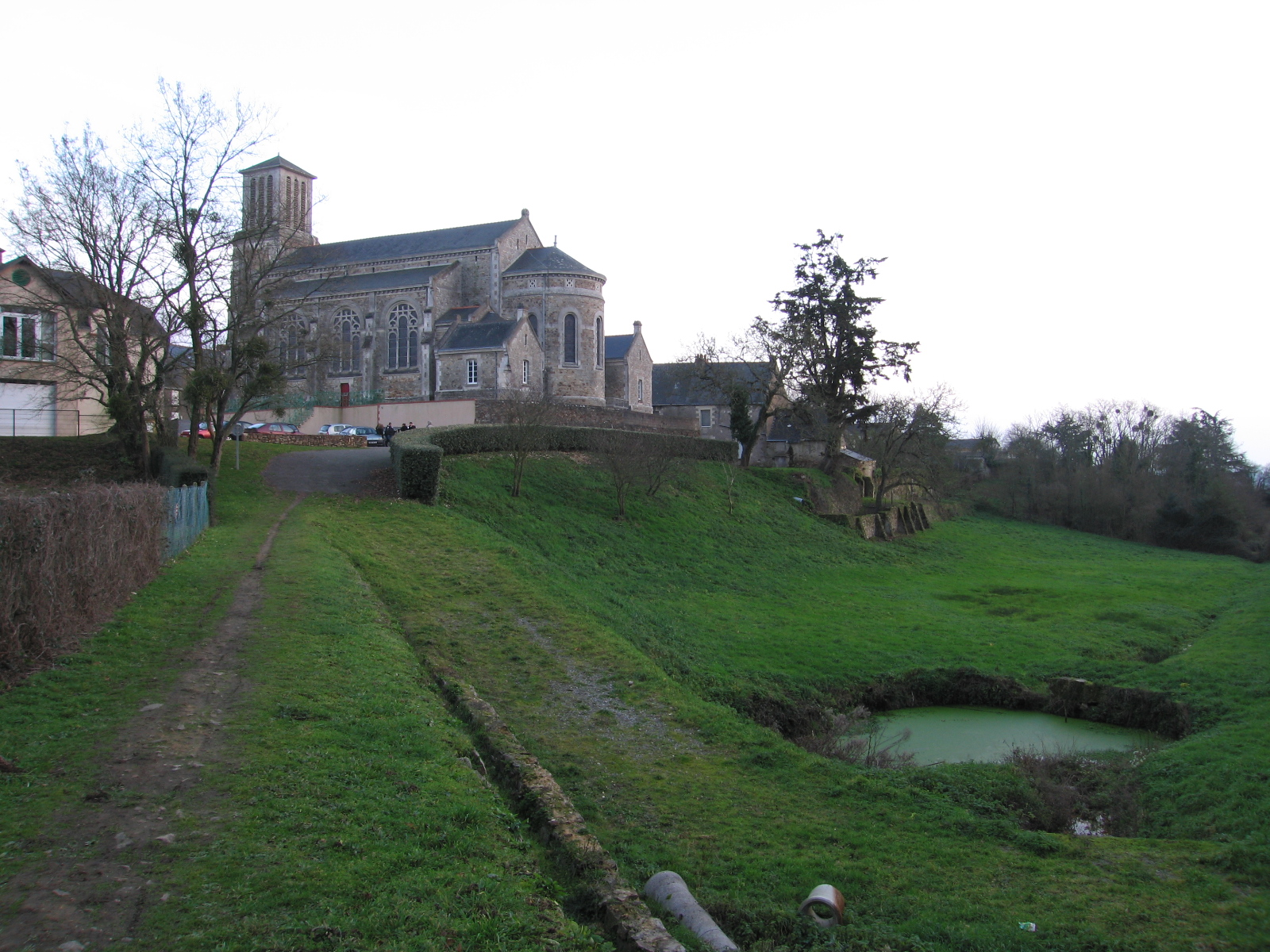

- Coat of arms
- Location of La Chapelle-Launay
- Location within France Location within Pays de la Loire
- Coordinates: 47°22′24″N 1°58′14″W
- Country: France
- Region: Pays de la Loire
- Department: Loire-Atlantique
- Arrondissement: Saint-Nazaire
- Canton: Blain
- Intercommunality: Estuaire et Sillon

Government
  - Mayor (2020–2026): Michel Guillard
- Area^{1}: 24.82 km^{2} (9.58 sq mi)
- Highest elevation: 77 m (253 ft)
- Lowest elevation: 0 m (0 ft)
- Population (2023): 3,270
  - Density: 132/km^{2} (341/sq mi)
- Time zone: UTC+01:00 (CET)
  - Summer (DST): UTC+02:00 (CEST)
- INSEE/Postal code: 44033 /44260
- ^{1} French Land Register data, which excludes lakes, ponds, glaciers > 1 km^{2} (0.386 sq mi or 247 acres) and river estuaries.

La Chapelle-Launay (French pronunciation: [la ʃapɛl lonɛ]; Gallo: La Chapèll-L'Aunaèy, Breton: Chapel-ar-Wern) is a commune in the Loire-Atlantique department, western France.

== Location ==
Located halfway between Nantes and St. Nazaire, it is well served by transport networks. The town is in the west of the Loire-Atlantic, just north of the Loire estuary. The nearest town is Savenay at 2.7 km.

== Population ==
Historical population

Year	Pop.	±% p.a.
1793	1,169	—
1821	1,442	+0.75%
1846	1,443	+0.00%
1872	1,576	+0.34%
1901	1,454	−0.28%
1926	1,241	−0.63%
1946	1,297	+0.22%
1962	1,211	−0.43%
1968	1,307	+1.28%

Year	Pop.	±% p.a.
1975	1,354	+0.51%
1982	1,839	+4.47%
1990	2,249	+2.55%
1999	2,258	+0.04%
2007	2,688	+2.20%
2012	2,803	+0.84%
2017	3,052	+1.72%
2023	3,270	+1.16%

Source: EHESS and INSEE (1968-2023)

== Climate ==
Chapelle-Launay climate is, like the rest of the Loire-Atlantique, a temperate oceanic climate. This climate is heavily influenced by the estuary of the Loire. Winters are mild (min 3 °C / Max 10 °C) and summers are mild (12 °C min / max 24 °C). Snowfall is rare. Rain is frequent (113 days per year of precipitation), with annual precipitation averaging about 743 mm, however rainfall is quite variable from one year to another. The average sunshine is 1826 hours per year. The presence of the Sillon de Bretagne, however, causes some local variations in the climate, with marsh areas generally colder than the rest of the town. This area is also often shrouded by fog in the winter.

Climate data for Saint-Nazaire, elevation 3m, 1961–1990
Month	Jan	Feb	Mar	Apr	May	Jun	Jul	Aug	Sep	Oct	Nov	Dec	Year
Mean daily maximum °C (°F)	11.3 (52.3)	12.7 (54.9)	11.9 (53.4)	15 (59)	21 (70)	22.1 (71.8)	22.9 (73.2)	21.6 (70.9)	19.9 (67.8)	16.3 (61.3)	12 (54)	8.5 (47.3)	16.3 (61.3)
Mean daily minimum °C (°F)	4.8 (40.6)	4 (39)	5.6 (42.1)	6.3 (43.3)	11.4 (52.5)	12.1 (53.8)	13.6 (56.5)	14.3 (57.7)	9.9 (49.8)	7.8 (46.0)	6.8 (44.2)	2 (36)	8.2 (46.8)
Average precipitation mm (inches)	106.6 (4.20)	61.2 (2.41)	71.4 (2.81)	63 (2.5)	73.4 (2.89)	31.4 (1.24)	73.8 (2.91)	52.2 (2.06)	66.8 (2.63)	59.2 (2.33)	63.8 (2.51)	63.2 (2.49)	786 (30.9)
Source: Met Office

== History ==
=== Prehistory and Antiquity ===
During the Gallic period the area belonged to the Namnetes, who were conquered by Julius Caesar in 56 BC. In a vase of terra-cotta, about 4 000 currencies of bronze, silver, and a golden currency are found in 1904 and 1906, accompanied with a golden ring and with seven silver spoons.

Of this treasure, which belongs to the monetary deposits buried during the disorders of the years 270-275, the departmental Dobrée museum preserves 350 currencies of bronze and silver, the golden currency in the effigy of the "Gallic" emperor Postumus, the golden ring and the six of seven silver spoons today.

=== Middle Ages ===
After the fall of the Western Roman Empire in 476, the country rapidly came under the control of Clovis I despite resistance from the Roman garrison of Breton soldiers. During the Frankish period, the country became the 'Breton March'. During the reign of Charlemagne; the territory was initially under the dominion of his nephew, Roland, who was given the title of 'Prefect of the Breton March'.

=== Breton Rule ===
After Charlemagne's death, Breton expansion intensified. In 850, the region was conquered by Nominoë, the ruler of Brittany, who invaded, among others, the towns of Nantes and Rennes. The following year, in the aftermath of the Battle of Jengland, the Breton March, with Nantes as its capital, was integrated into Brittany by the Treaty of Angers. The subsequent eighty years, however, were made difficult by the constant infighting between the Breton warlords, who promoted Viking invasions. From 919 to 937, the town was managed by the Vikings, who were defeated by Alain Barbe-Torte, the grandson of Alan the Great, the last king of Brittany.

=== The Wars of Succession ===
In the subsequent period, the Dukes of Brittany fought against the Counts of Nantes. These succession feuds resulted from time to time in Nantes passing under the sovereignty of the house of Anjou. The longest of these periods began in 1156 and lasted 45 years, representing a period of stability. In 1203 Brittany came under the dominion of the Capetians, the French monarchy.

Abbey of Blanche-Couronne first date known 1161.

The Second Breton War of Succession pitted the supporters of two different claimants against one another: those of the half-brother of the deceased John III, Duke of Brittany, Jean de Montfort, who relied on the Estates of Brittany who gathered in Nantes, and those of Charles I, Duke of Brittany, who was supported by King Philippe VI of France and was recognized as Duke of Brittany by the peers of the kingdom. The De Montfort dynasty emerged victorious from the conflict.

The county was conquered in 1488, from which point Brittany was governed by the kings of France. The heir to the duchy, Anne of Brittany, married Charles VIII of France in 1491, and then Louis XII of France, making her Queen of France. At her death in 1514, she bequeathed her heart to the town of Nantes (currently in the Dobrée museum). Claude of France, the eldest daughter of Anne of Brittany, donated the duchy to her husband Francis I of France, but the Estates of Brittany themselves requested the union of Brittany and France in exchange for the continuation of their privileges, which ushered in the next period.

=== Union of Brittany and France ===
In 1532 the duchy of Brittany became a part of the French crown lands, as a result of the Union of Brittany and France, an edict declaring a perpetual and indissoluble union between Brittany and France.

=== French Revolution ===
The Battle of Savenay on 23 December 1793 was the last, decisive battle of the Revolt in the Vendée during the French Revolution. In this battle the forces of the royalist counter-revolutionaries were irrevocably shattered and many survivor from the battle were killed in the Chapelle-Launay territory.

=== Second World War ===
After D-day and the liberation of most of France in 1944, German troops in Saint-Nazaire's submarine base refused to surrender, and they holed up (as did their counterparts in the La Rochelle and Lorient bases). Since the Germans could no longer conduct major submarine operations from the bases without a supply line, the SHAEF commander, U.S. General Dwight D. Eisenhower decided to simply bypass these ports, and the Allied armies focused their resources on the invasion of Germany. Saint-Nazaire and the other two German "pockets" remained under Nazi control until the last day of the war in Europe, 8 May 1945.

== See also ==
- Communes of the Loire-Atlantique department
