= Jules-Élie Delaunay =

French painter (1828–1891)

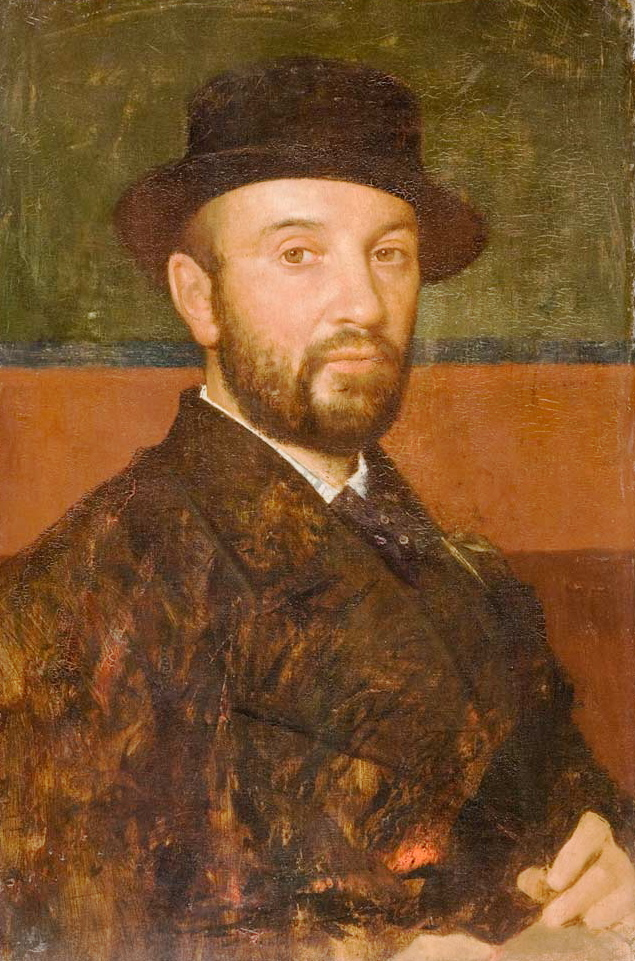
Self-portrait, c. 1860)

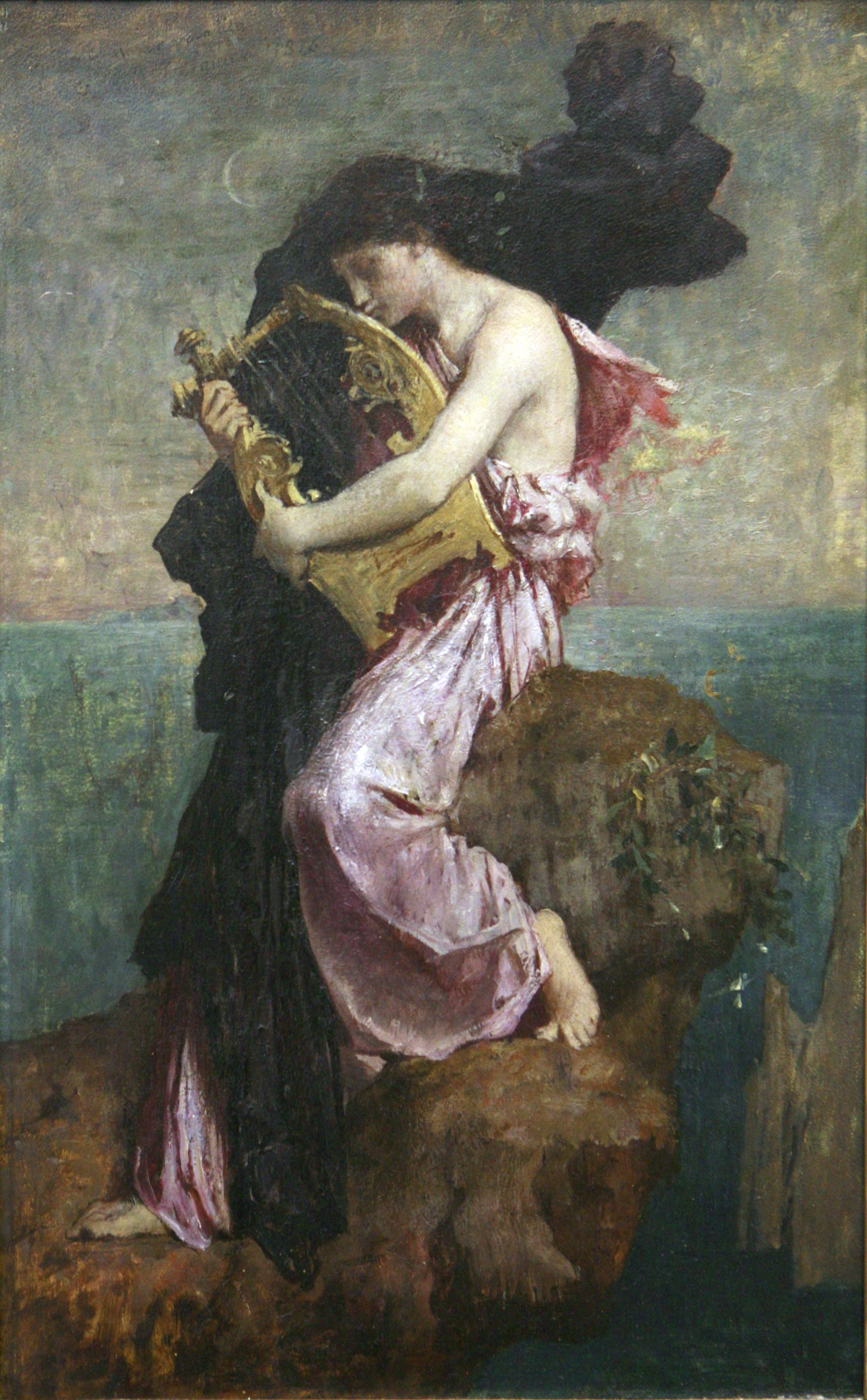
Sappho kissing her lyre, oil on canvas

Jules-Élie Delaunay (French: [dəlonɛ]; June 13, 1828 – September 5, 1891) was a French academic painter.

== Biography ==
He was born at Nantes in the Loire-Atlantique département of France. Delaunay studied under Flandrin, and at the École des Beaux Arts in Paris under Lamothe. He worked in the classicist manner of Ingres until, after winning the Prix de Rome, he went to Italy; in 1856, and abandoned the ideal of Raphaelesque perfection for the sincerity and severity of the quattrocentists.

After his return from Rome he was entrusted with many important commissions for decorative paintings, such as the frescoes in the church of St Nicholas at Nantes; the three panels of Apollo, Orpheus and Amphion at the Paris Opera house; and twelve paintings for the great hall of the council of state in the Palais Royal.

His Scenes from the Life of St Genevieve, which he designed for the Panthéon, remained unfinished at his death. The Musée d'Orsay has his famous Plague in Rome (shown at the Salon of 1869) and a nude figure of Diana; and the Nantes Museum, the Lesson on the Flute.

In the last decade of his life he achieved great popularity as a portrait painter. Among his subjects were his “Mother” and “Mademoiselle Toulmouche.”

He was awarded a first-class medal at the Paris Exposition of 1878, and the medal of honor in 1889. In 1878 he became an officer of the Legion of Honor, and the following year was made a member of the Institute. Jules-Élie Delaunay died in Paris in 1891.
