= Ignacio Merino =

Peruvian painter

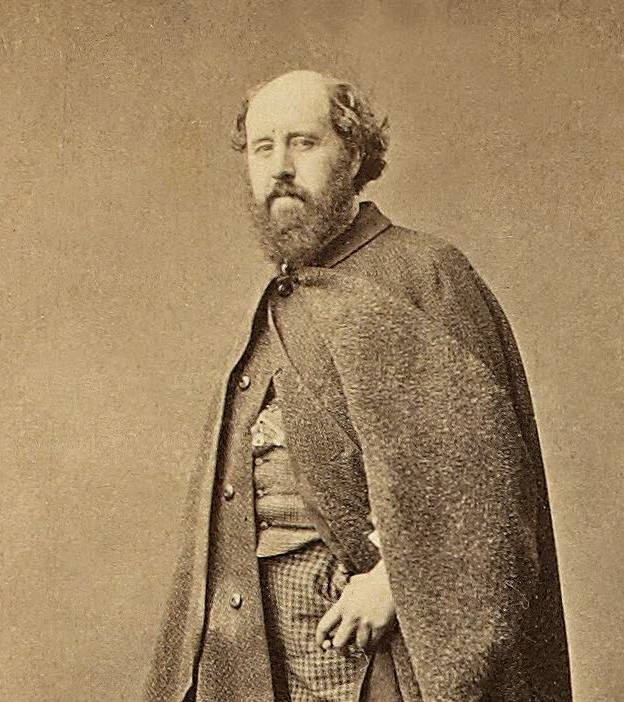
- Merino photographed c. 1860
- Known for: Founding the Peruvian school of art
- Style: History painting, costumbrista, academic art

Ignacio Merino Muñoz (30 January 1817 – 17 March 1876) was a Peruvian painter notable for historical and costumbrista works, and considered the founder of the Peruvian school of painting. Beginning at age 6, he spent much of his life in Paris.

His artworks inspired French writer Jules Verne's 1852 short story "Martin Paz," which was set in Lima, Peru and begins with a summarization of Merino's life and art.

== Biography ==
=== Early life in Peru ===
Ignacio Merino Muñoz was born on January 30, 1817, in Piura, Peru. His mother Doña Micaela María Muñoz, was from a wealthy aristocratic family in Trujillo, descending from maternal ancestry in both Spanish and Peruvian nobility. His father, Don José Clemente Merino, was a judge, district administrator and military commander. As a toddler on the beach, Merino would draw the contour outline of sailing ships in the sand, exhibiting skill in observational drawing. By the age of four, he was creating fine art on paper and seemed absorbed in its process, which impressed his mother; she expressed hope that Merino would be the first Peruvian fine artist.

=== First trip to Paris ===
Circa 1827, shortly after reaching 6 years of age, his parents allowed Merino to travel to Paris for an arts education, though they chose not to accompany him. There, Merino attended high school, earned his bachelor's degree in law, and pursued his art career. In Paris, Merino studied under French painters Raymond Monvoisin and Paul Delaroche, who inspired his interest in history painting. As a result of Delaroche's influence, Merino focused on themes from European history, whereas his Peruvian-themed paintings were generally in the costumbrista category.

=== Educating in Peru ===
In 1838, Merino returned to Peru at 20 years of age, also having studied in Italy and Spain. Upon his return, he established a school of lithography and a school of drawing and paint. He became Assistant Director, then Director of the "Academy of Drawing and Painting," founded by José Fernando de Abascal, where he taught or otherwise influenced the careers of other prominent painters, such as Luis Montero Cáceres, Francisco Masías and Francisco Laso.

During the 1840s, he created a series of portraits devoted to Peruvian saints, including Rose of Lima and Martín de Porres.

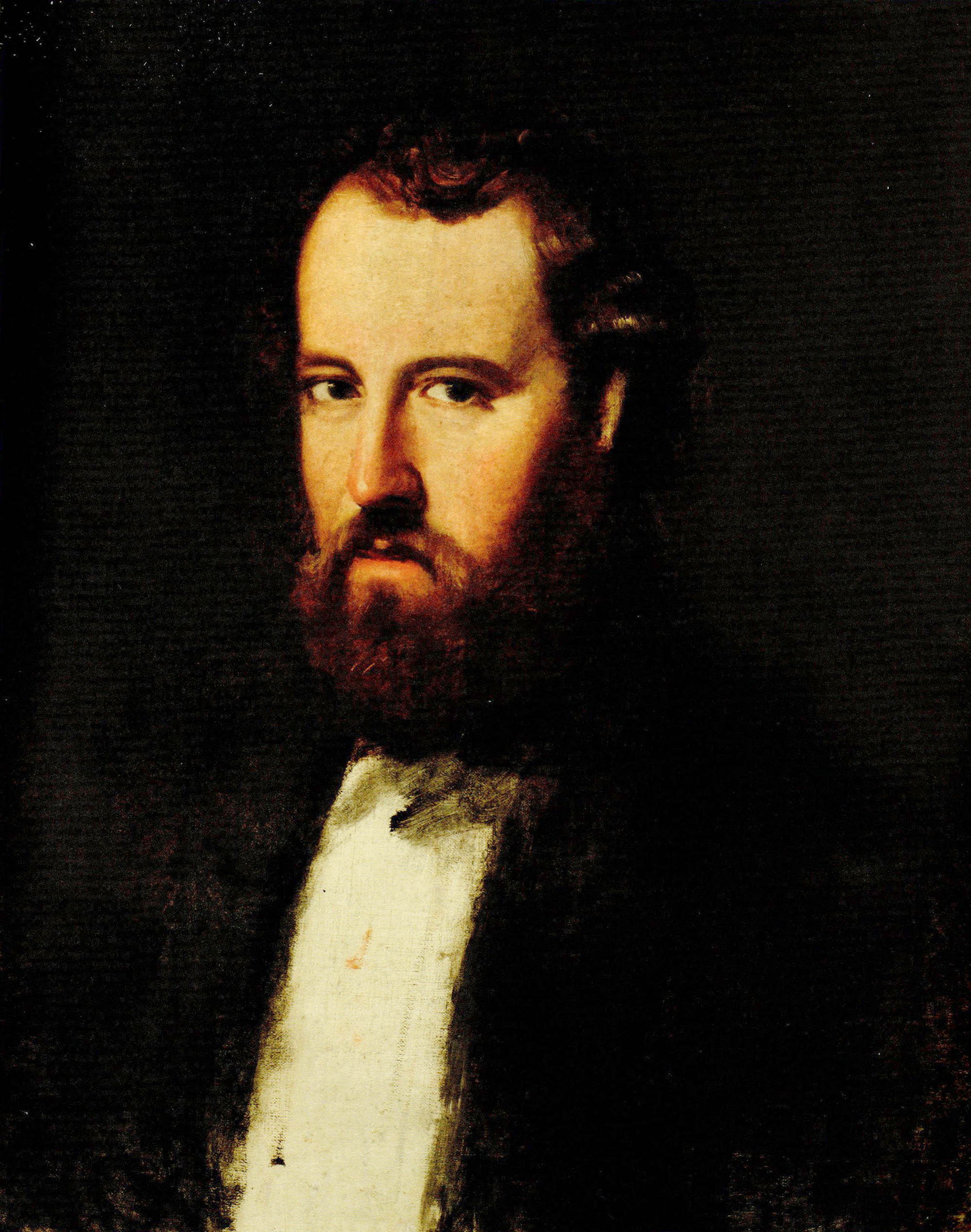
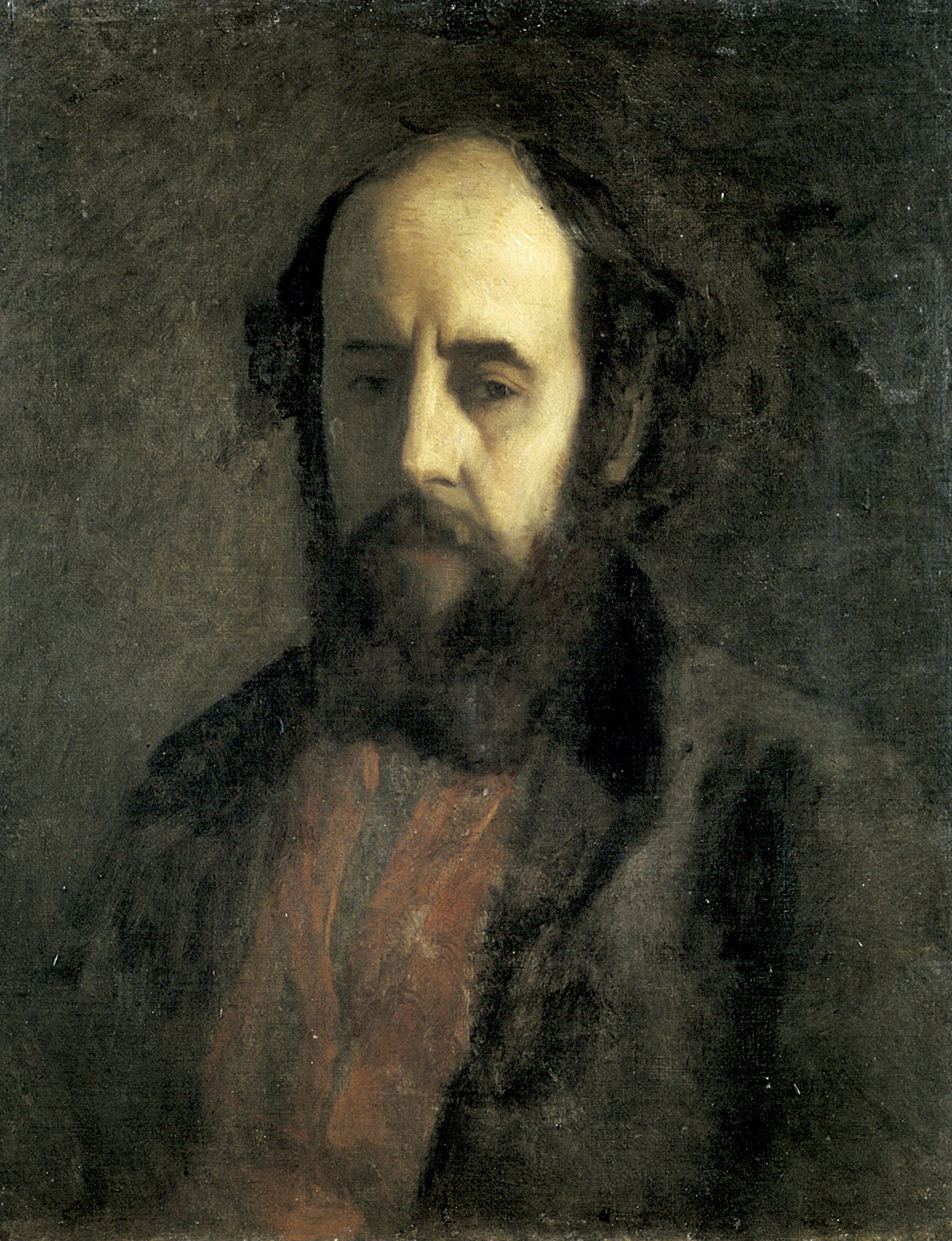
Two portraits of Merino, both made by Peruvian artists c. 1854; left by Luis Montero Cáceres, right by Francisco Laso

=== Return to Paris ===
In 1850, he had an opportunity to study with Eugène Delacroix, and returned to Paris. He would remain there for the rest of his life. It is said that an exhibition of his costumbrista paintings served as the inspiration for Martin Paz, an adventure story by Jules Verne, which was set in Lima. Upon returning to Paris, he produced 92 wood engravings for a luxury 1854 edition of Esteban Terralla y Landa's 1797 satire Lima por dentro y fuera, collaborating with Parisian printer A. Mézin and draftsman A. Jourdain. Many of these engravings, including landscapes, portraits, and popular scenes, served as studies for later canvases of costumbrista themes.

It was there he created his best-known painting, Colón ante los doctores en Salamanca, which was purchased by the government of President José Balta after winning a third-place medal at the "Exposition des Beaux-Arts". He was also inspired by European literature and created works based on the writings of Shakespeare, Sir Walter Scott and Miguel de Cervantes.

== Death and legacy ==
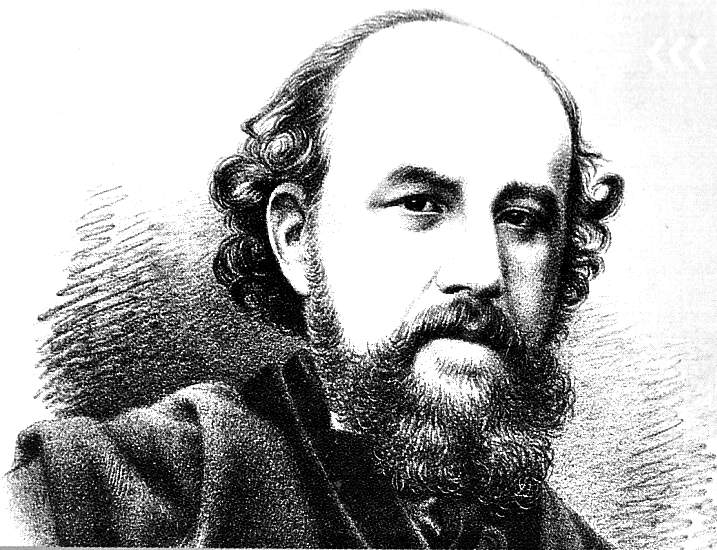
Posthumous (c. 1890) engraving of Merino by Evaristo San Cristóval

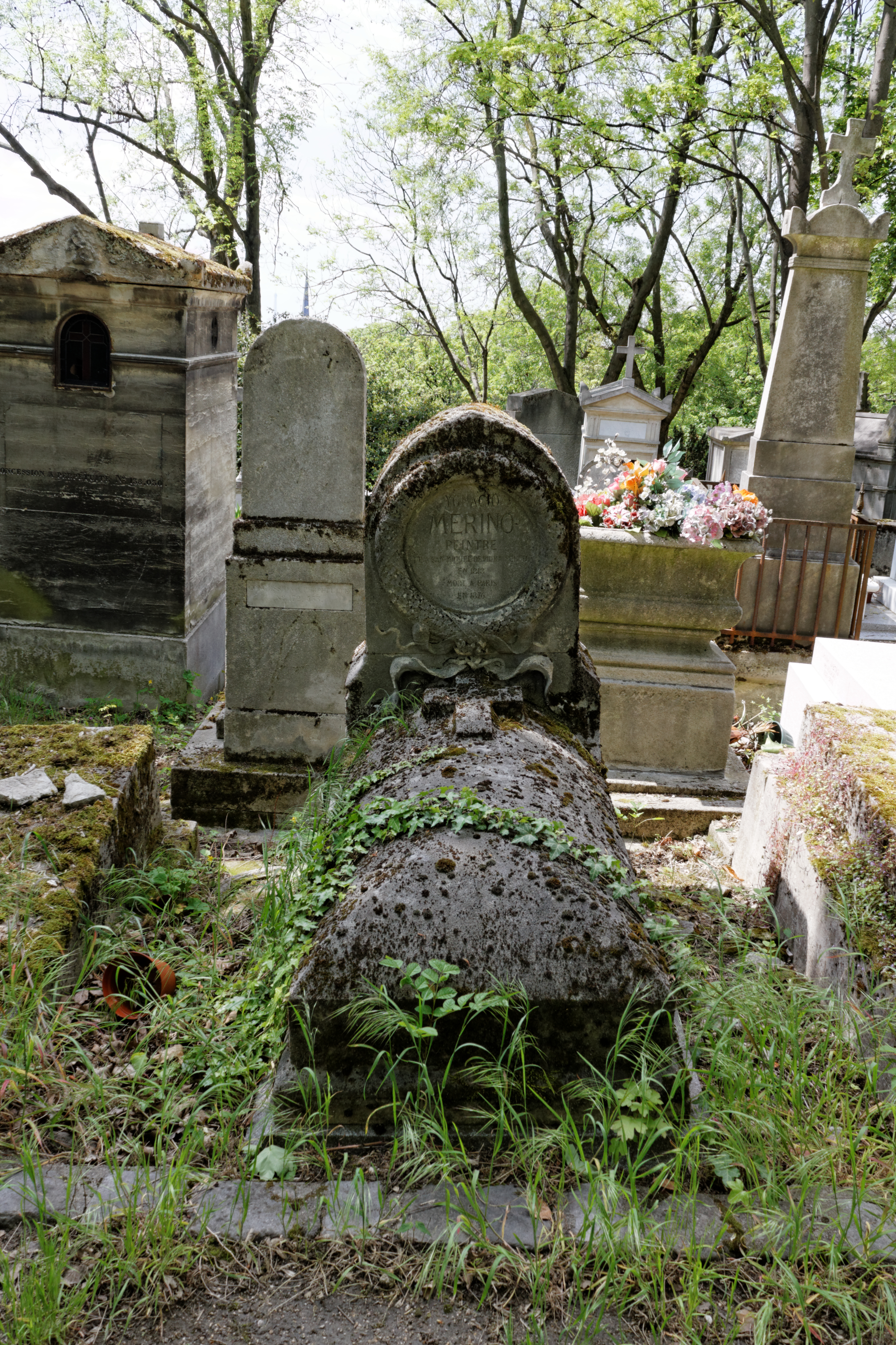
Grave of Merino, 2014 in Père Lachaise Cemetery

Merino died of tuberculosis in 1876, and he was buried in Père Lachaise Cemetery. Having never married and without an heir, he ceded his estate and artworks to the Municipality of Lima.

This included 33 paintings which, in 1925, were the first acquisitions of the newly founded Ignacio Merino Municipal Art Gallery, which continues to operate as of 2023.

== Gallery ==
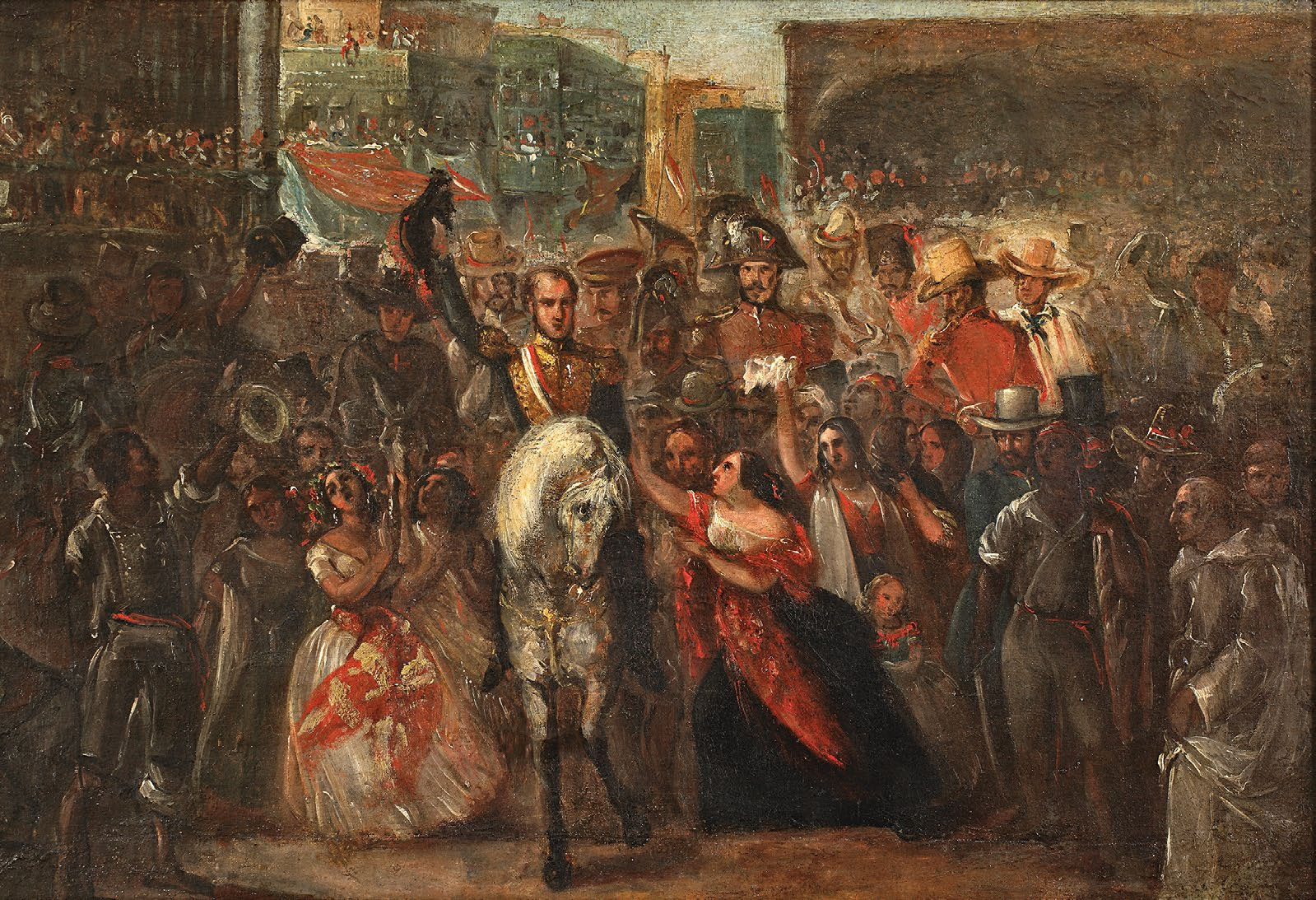
The Entry of President Luis José de Orbegoso to Lima, ca. 1842

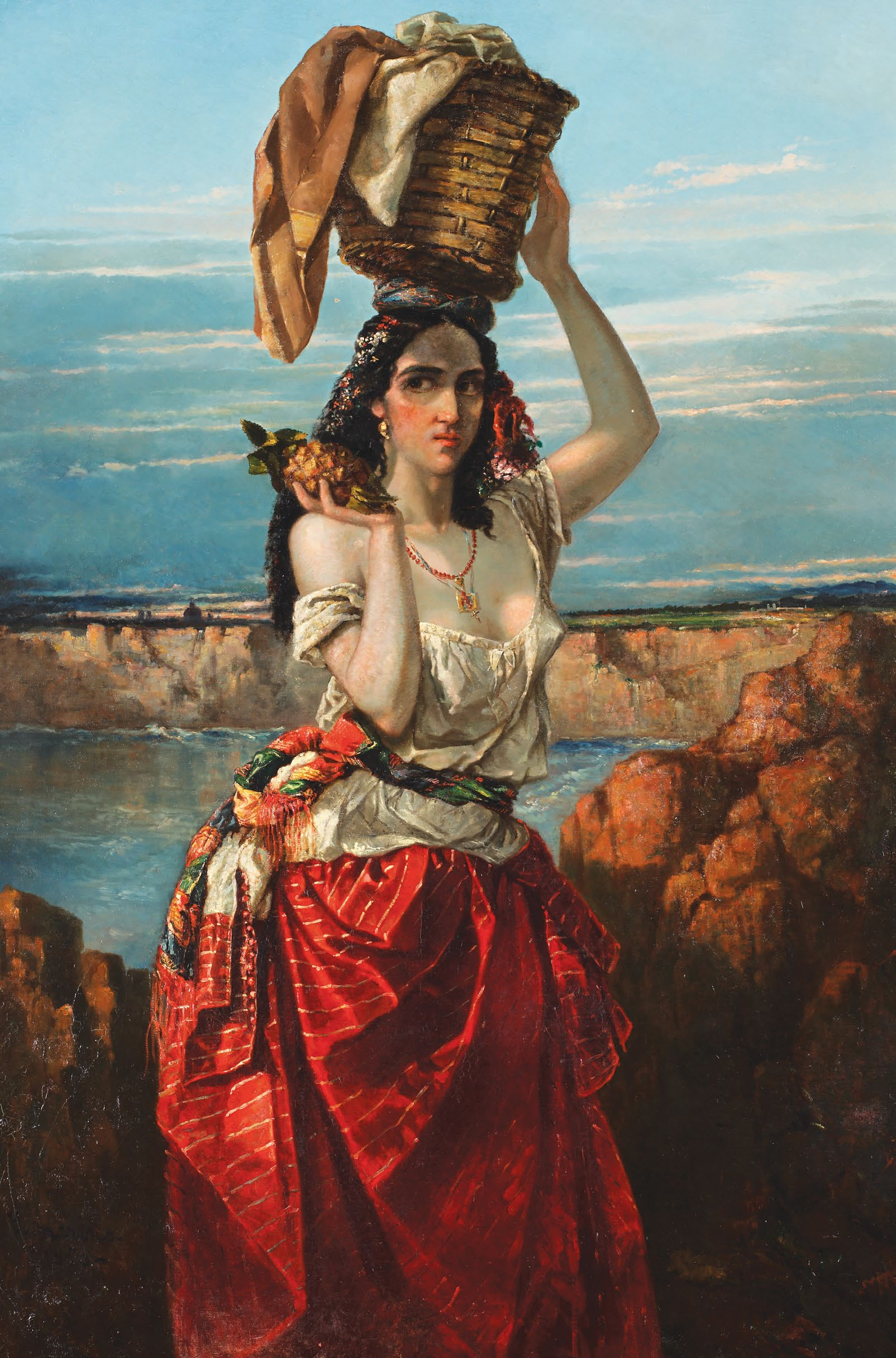
Frutera, 1850

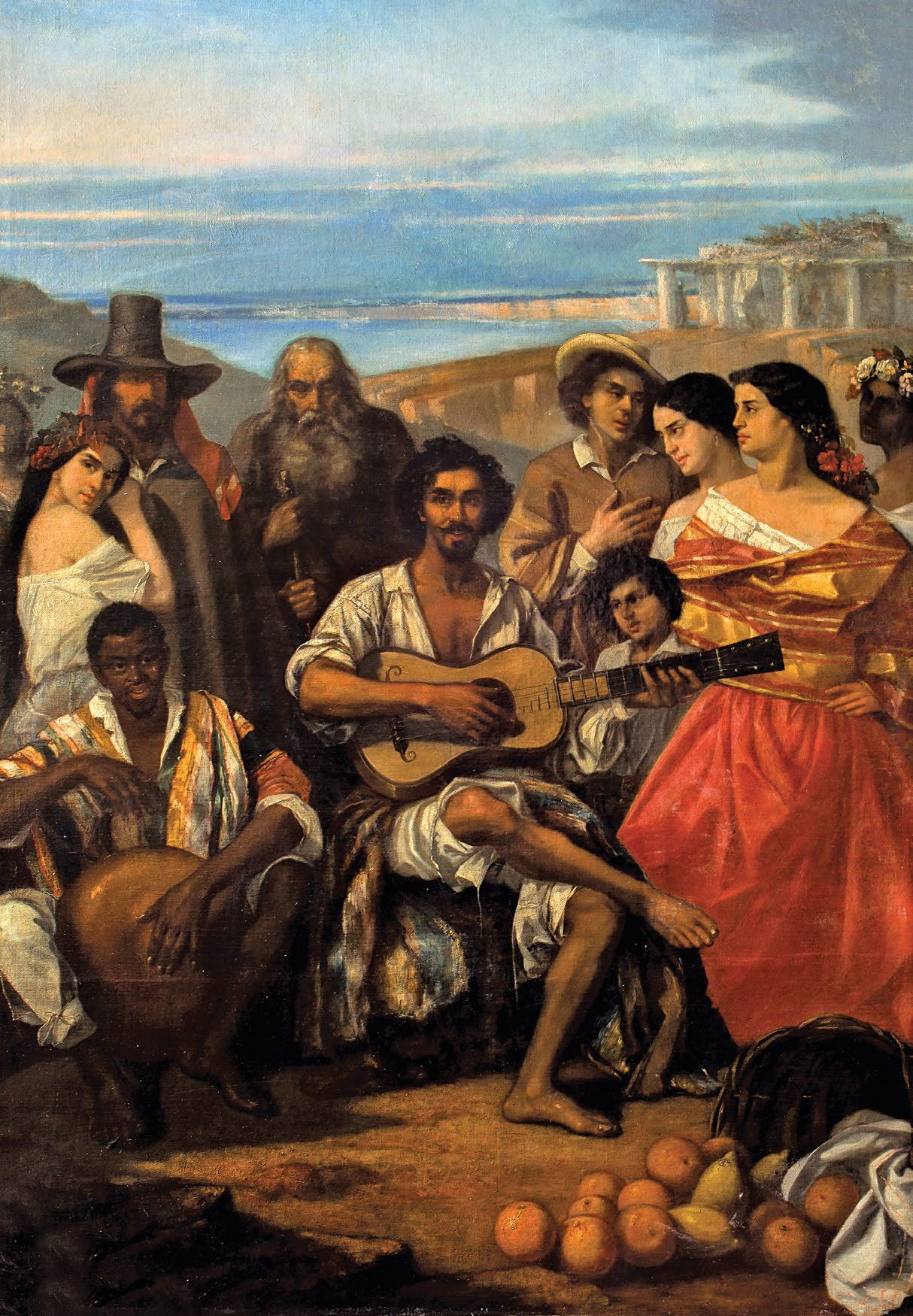
La Jarana (lit. The Revelry), c. 1857

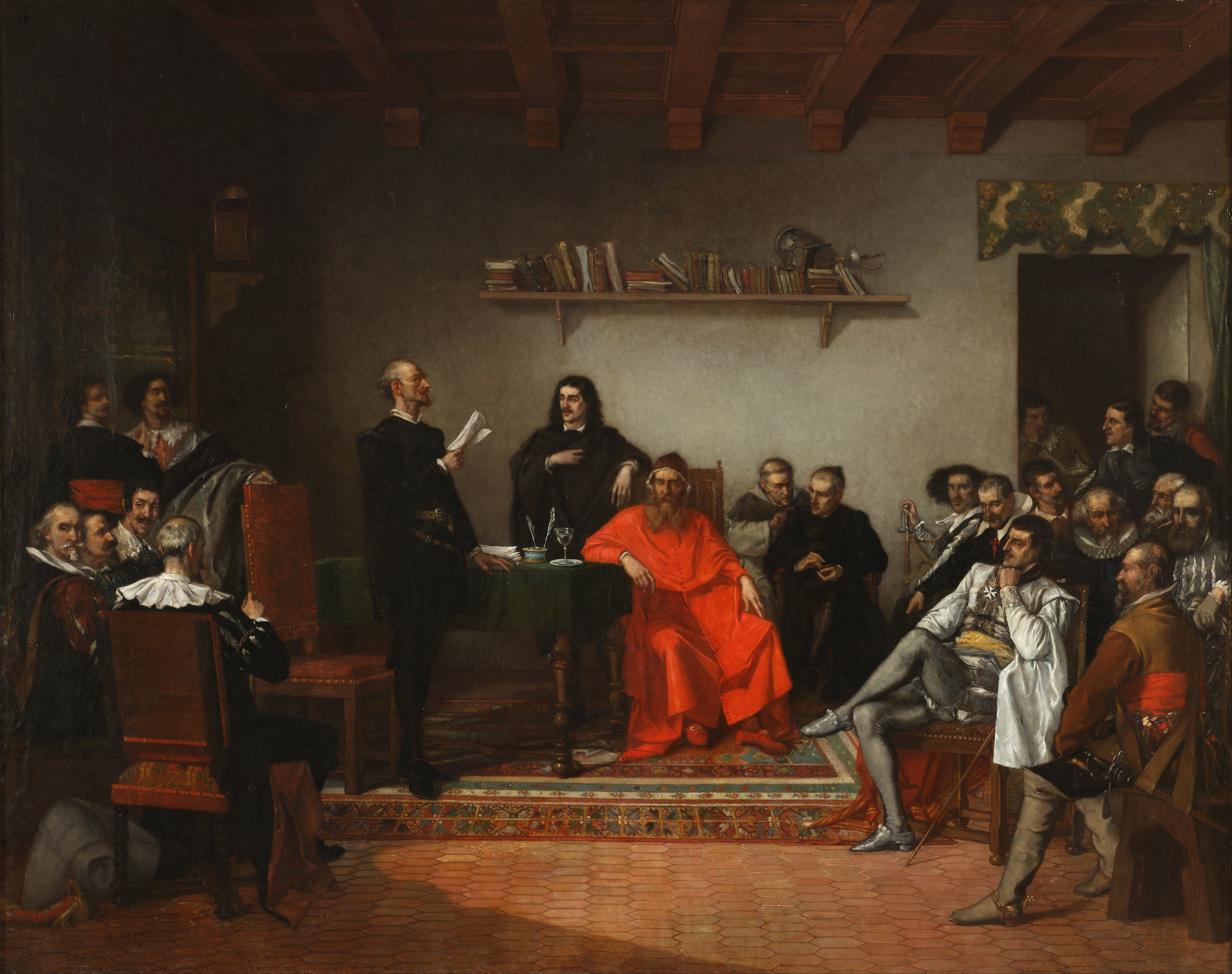
Reading Don Quixote, 1861

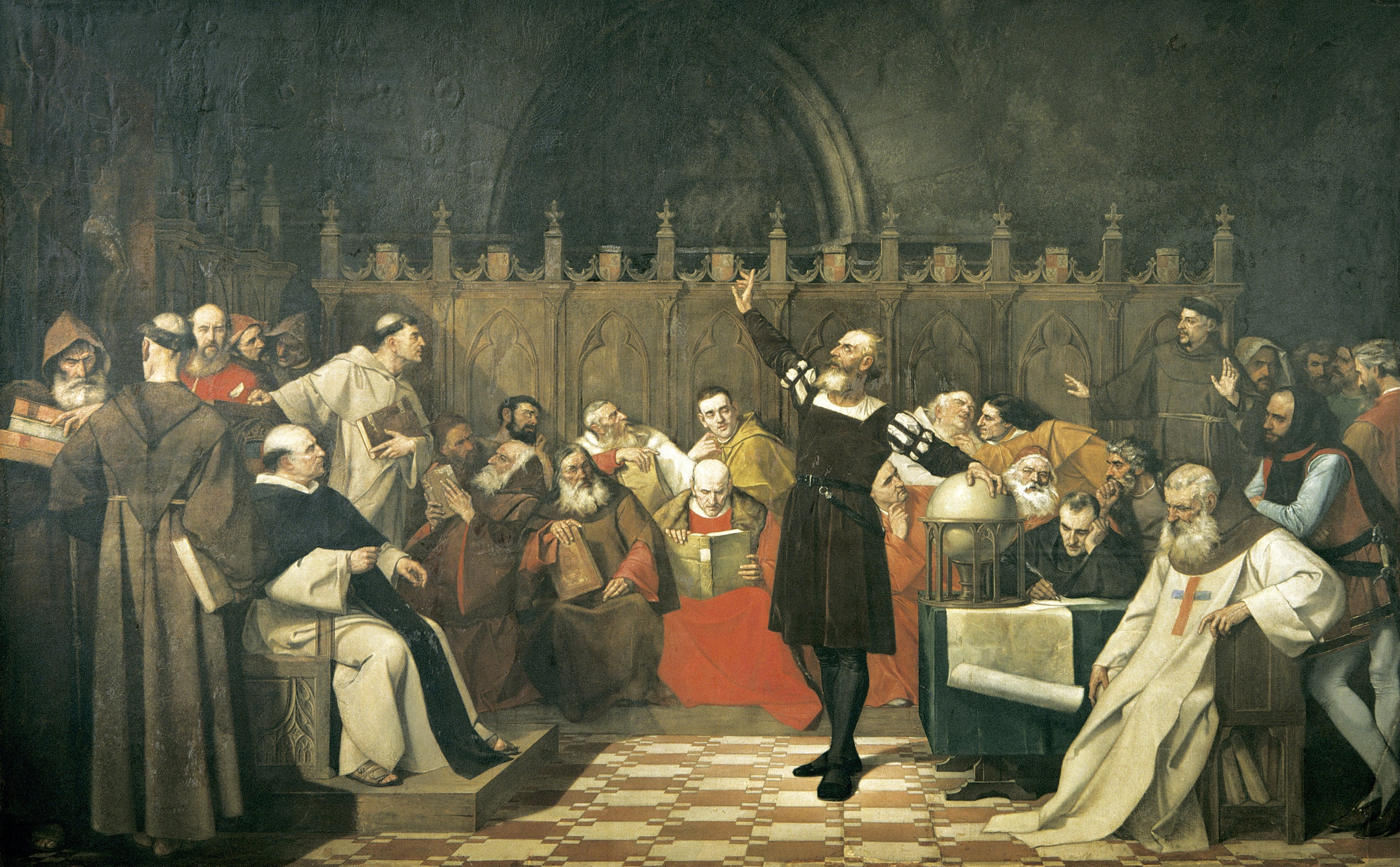
Columbus Before the Council of Salamanca, 1863

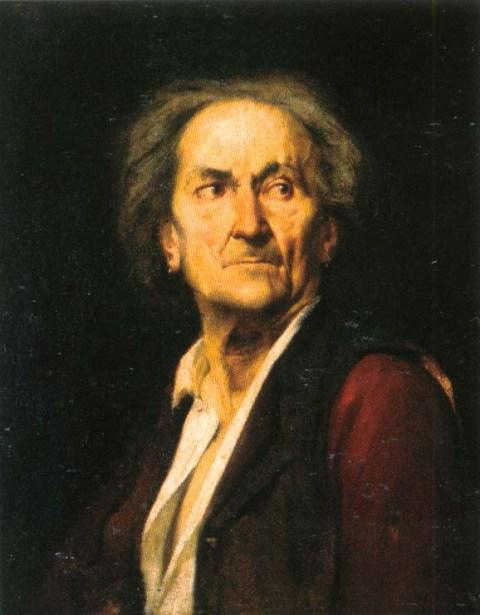
Portrait of an Old Man, unknown date

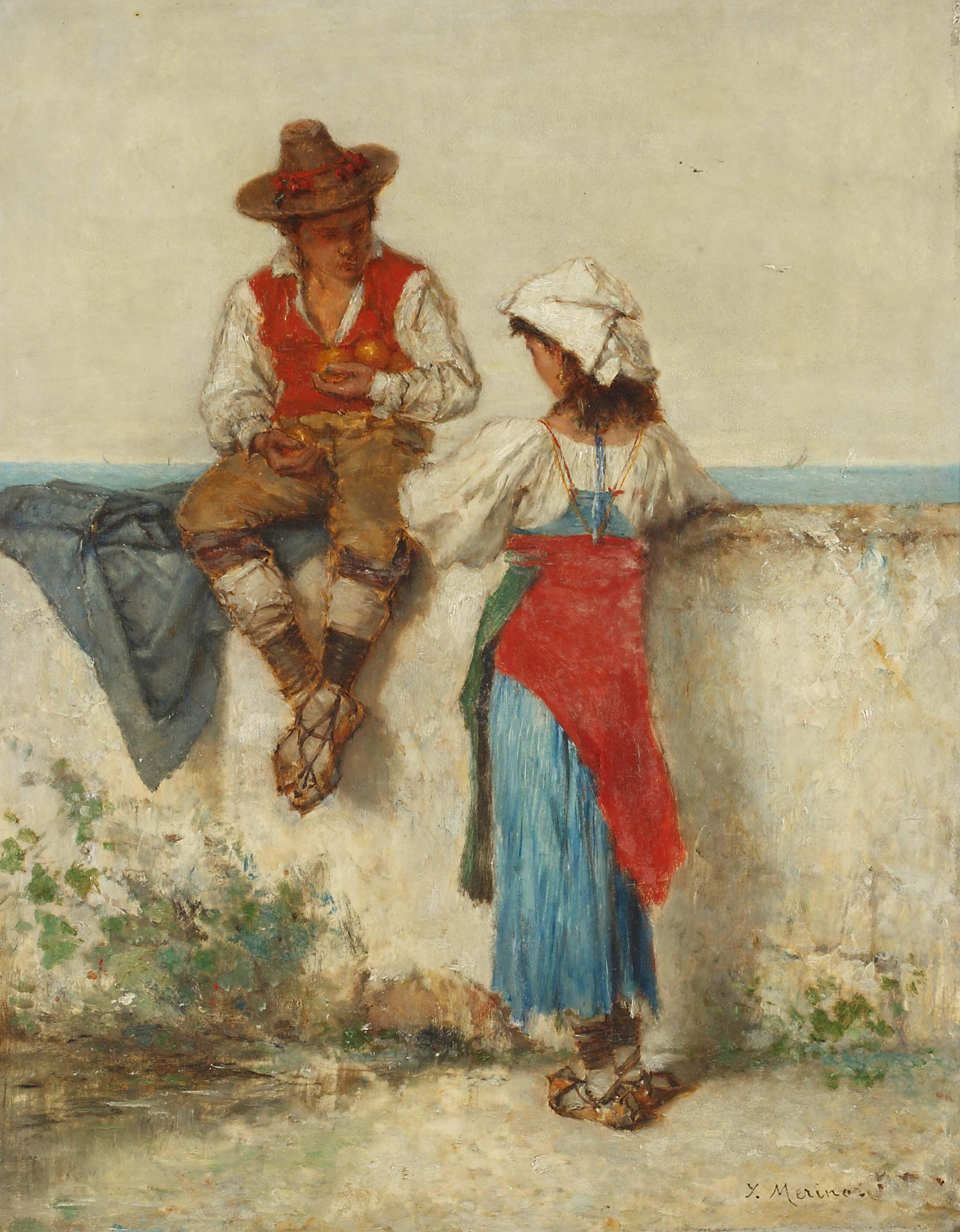
Italian Courtship, unknown date

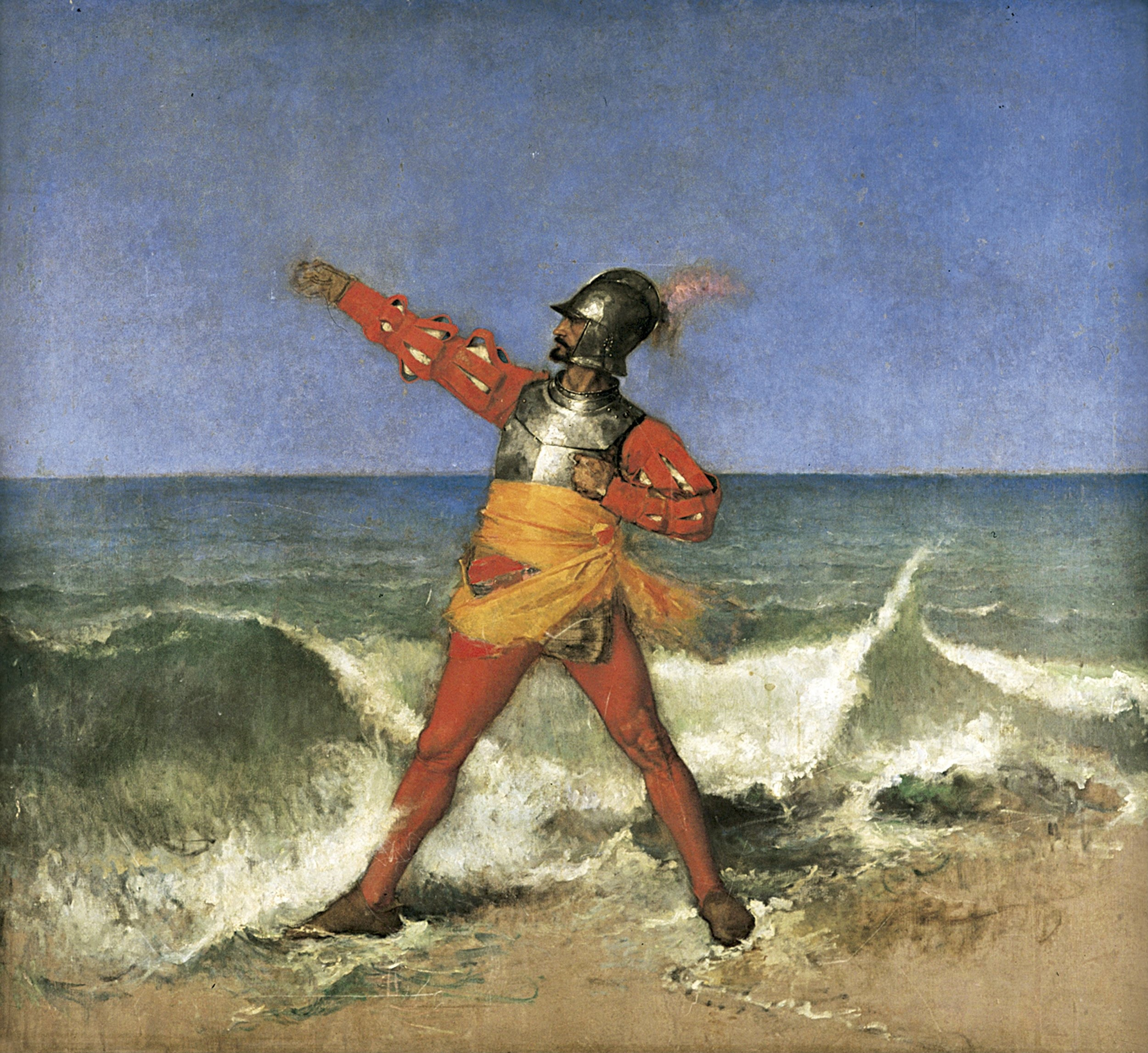
Pizarro Taking Possession of the Pacific in the Name of the Kings of Spain, c. 1850

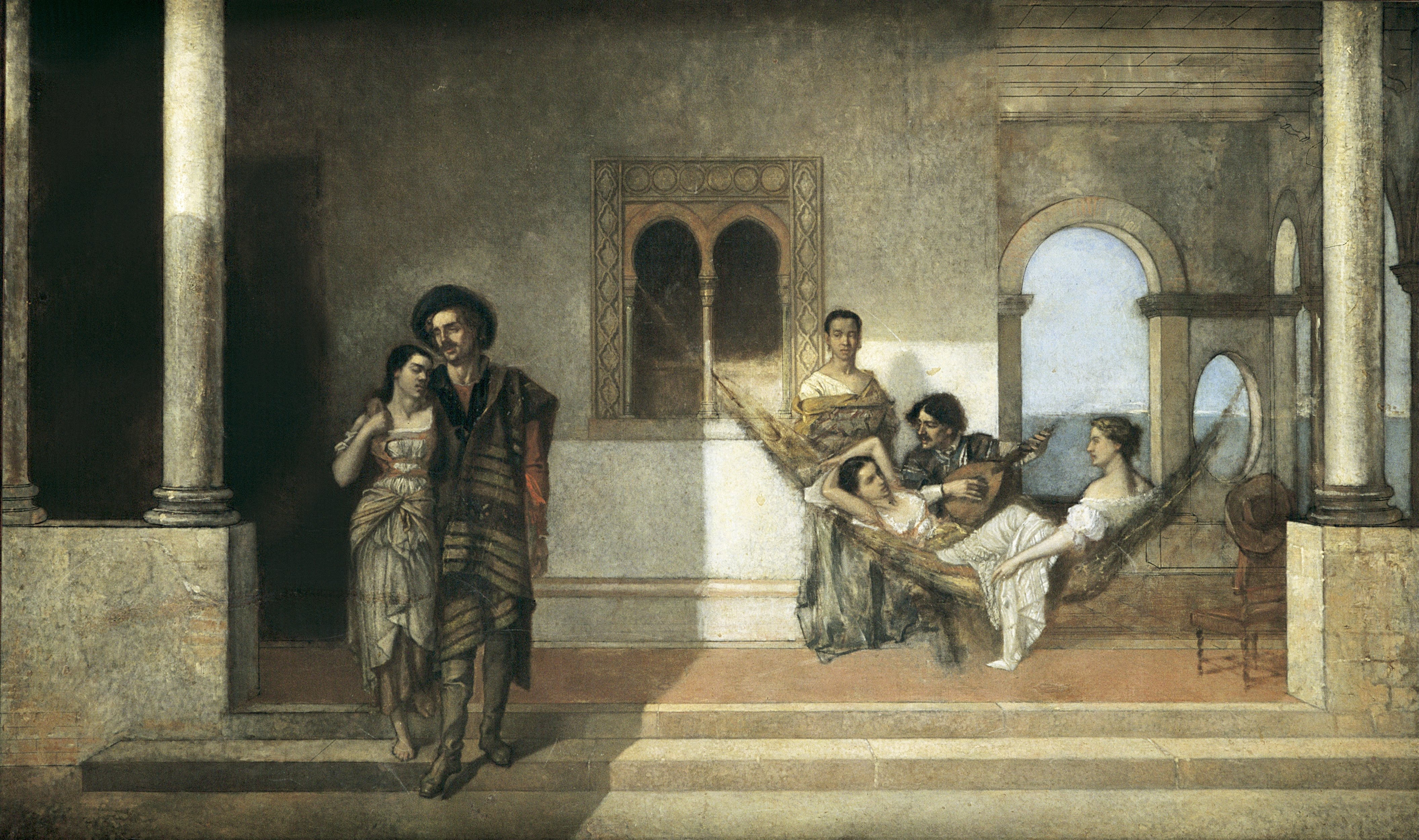
American Scene (Scenes from the Life of Andalusia), c. 1854

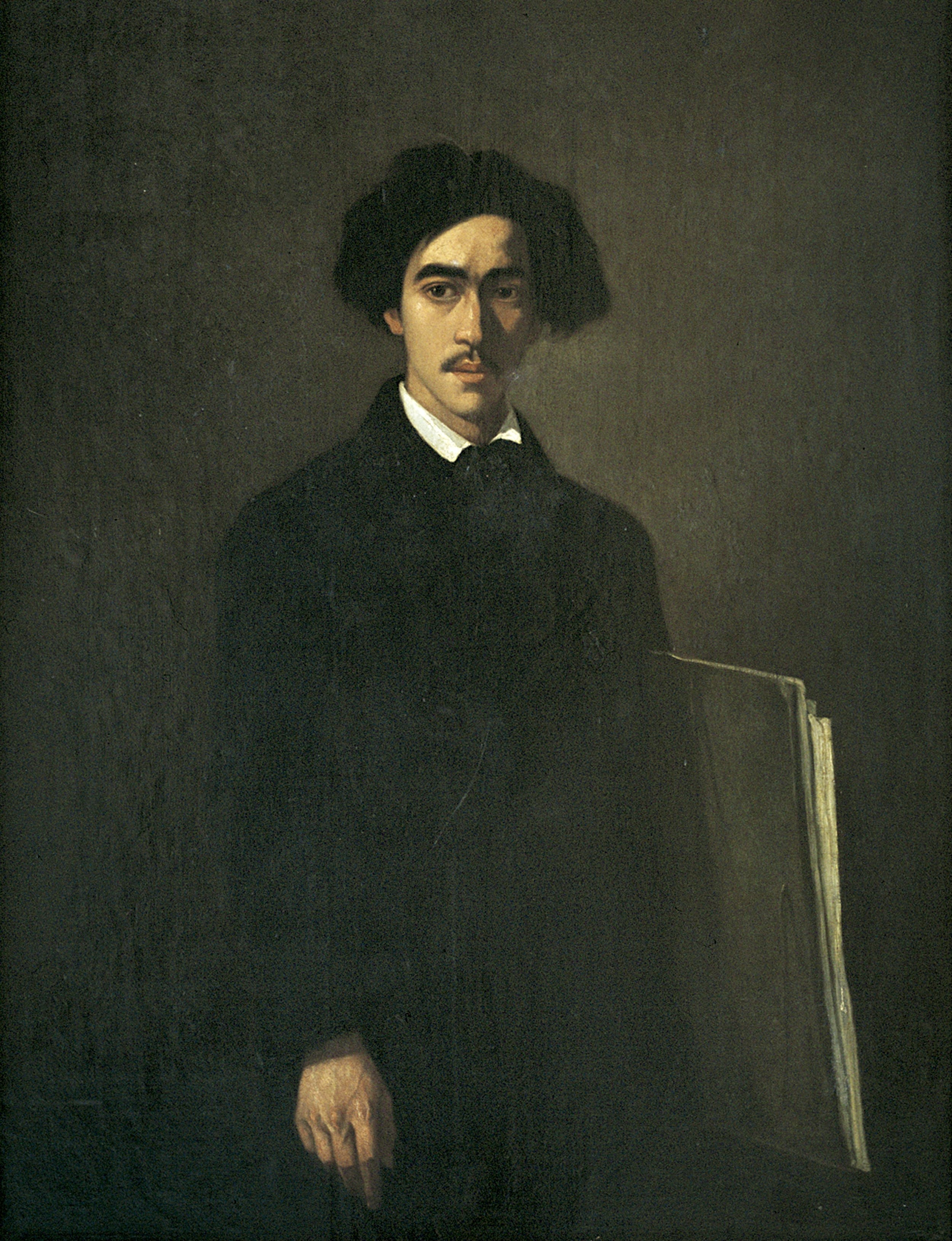
Portrait of Francisco Masías, 1855

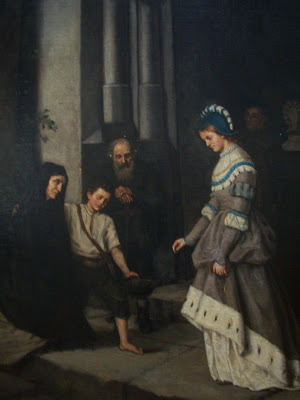
Woman Giving Alms, unknown date

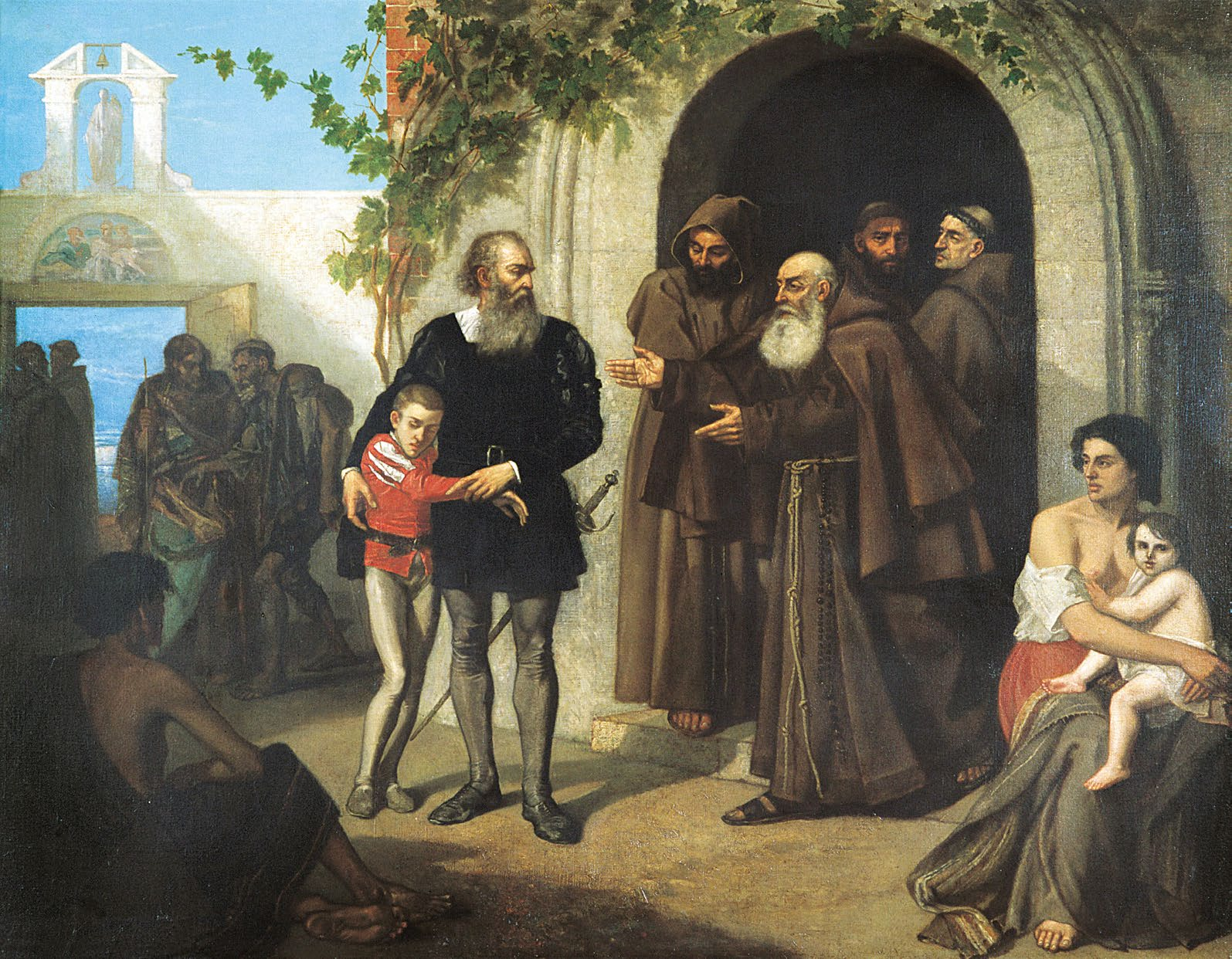
Christopher Columbus and His Son Lodged in the Convent of La Rábida, 1855

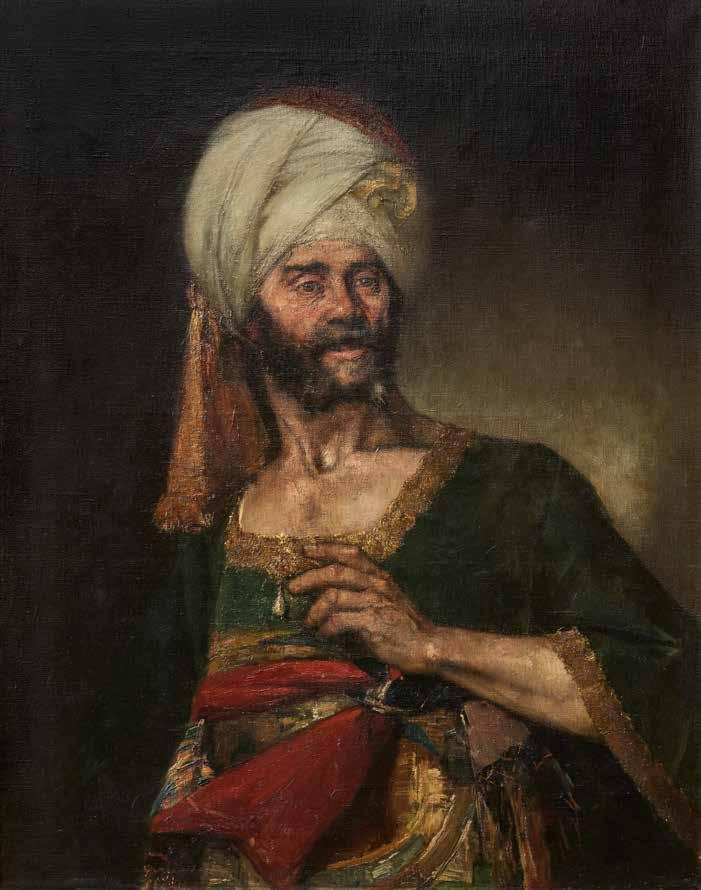
The Turk, unknown date

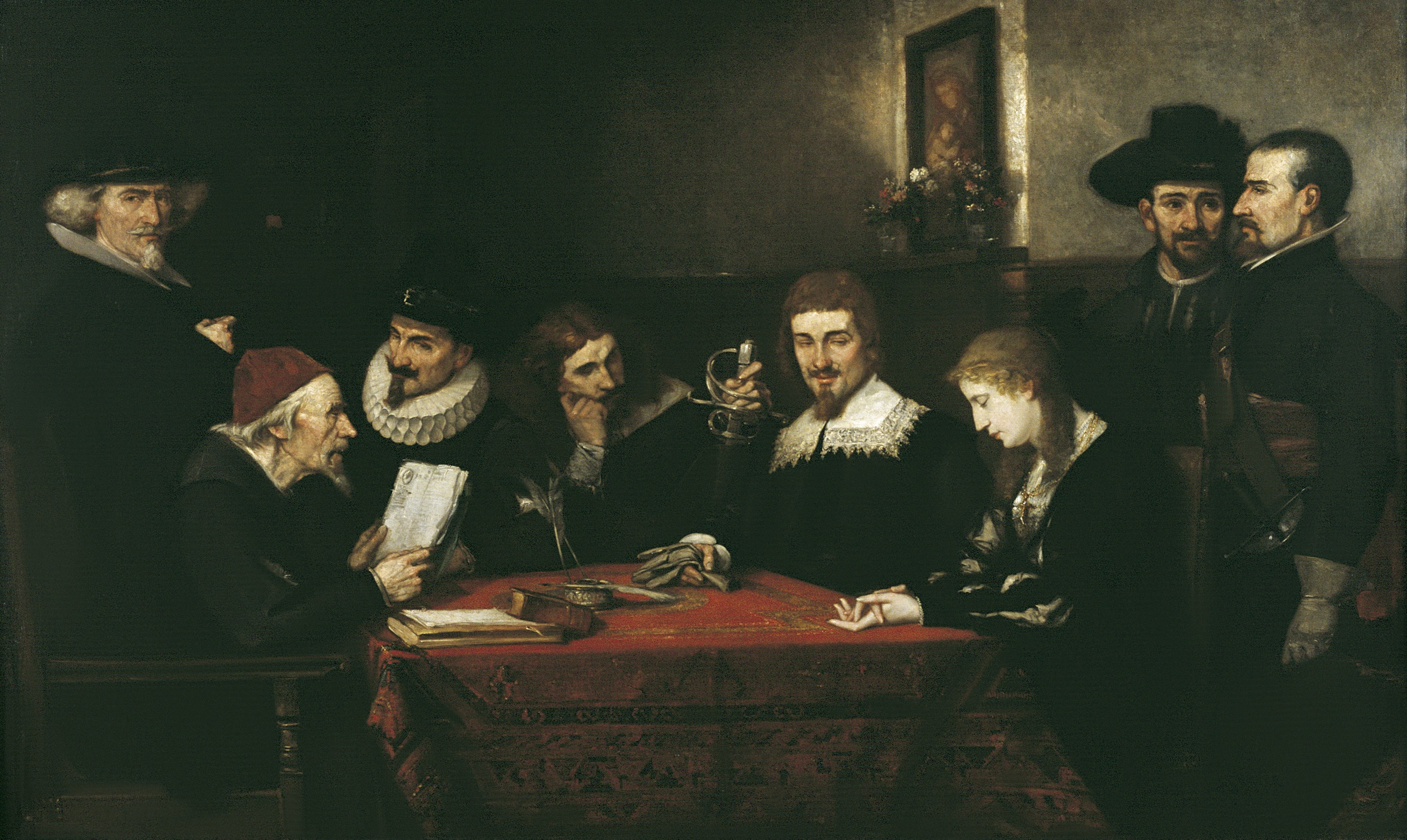
The Opening of the Will, 1864

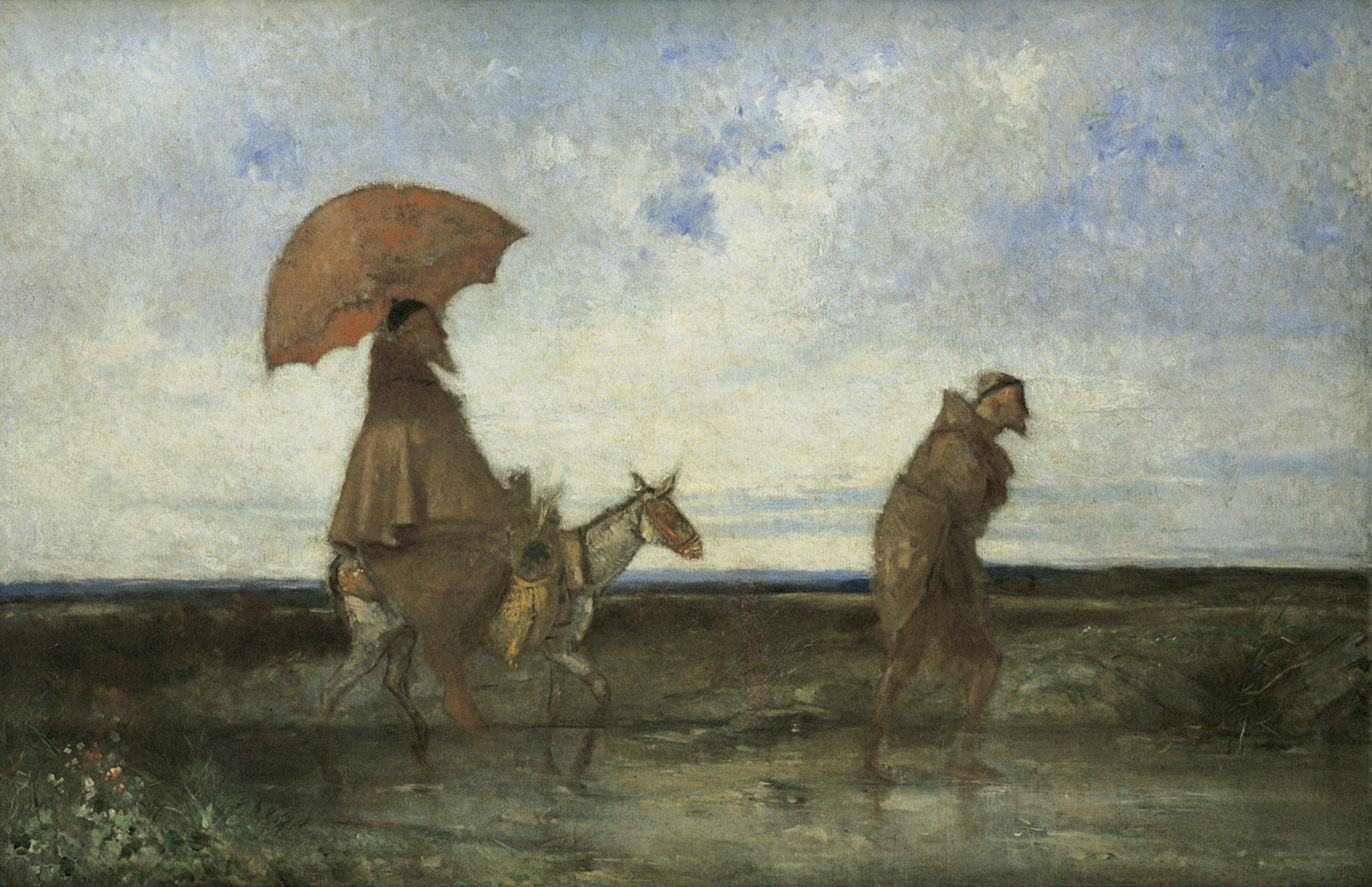
The Friars Crossing a Ford, c. 1865

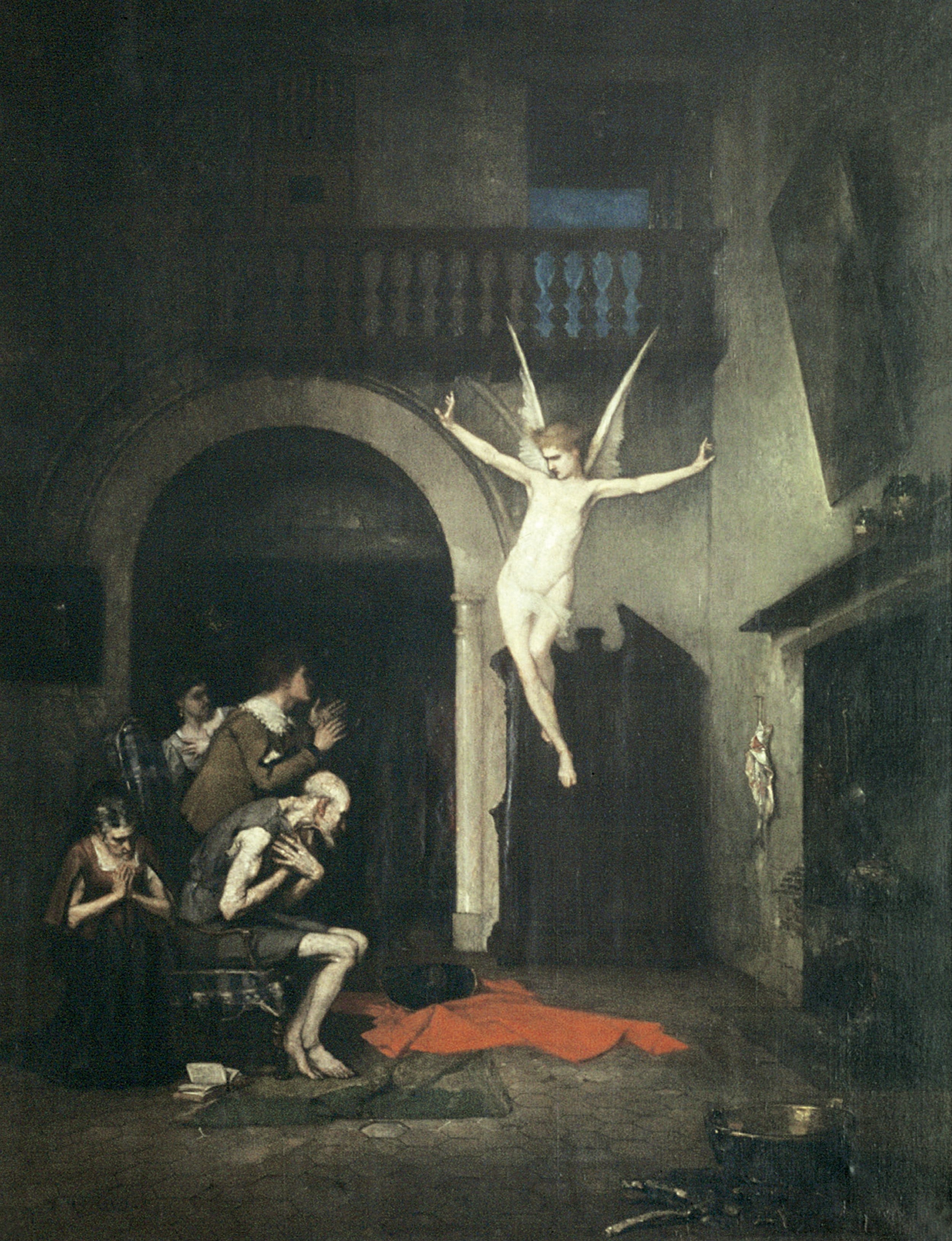
Appearance of the Angel to the Family of Tobias, c. 1867

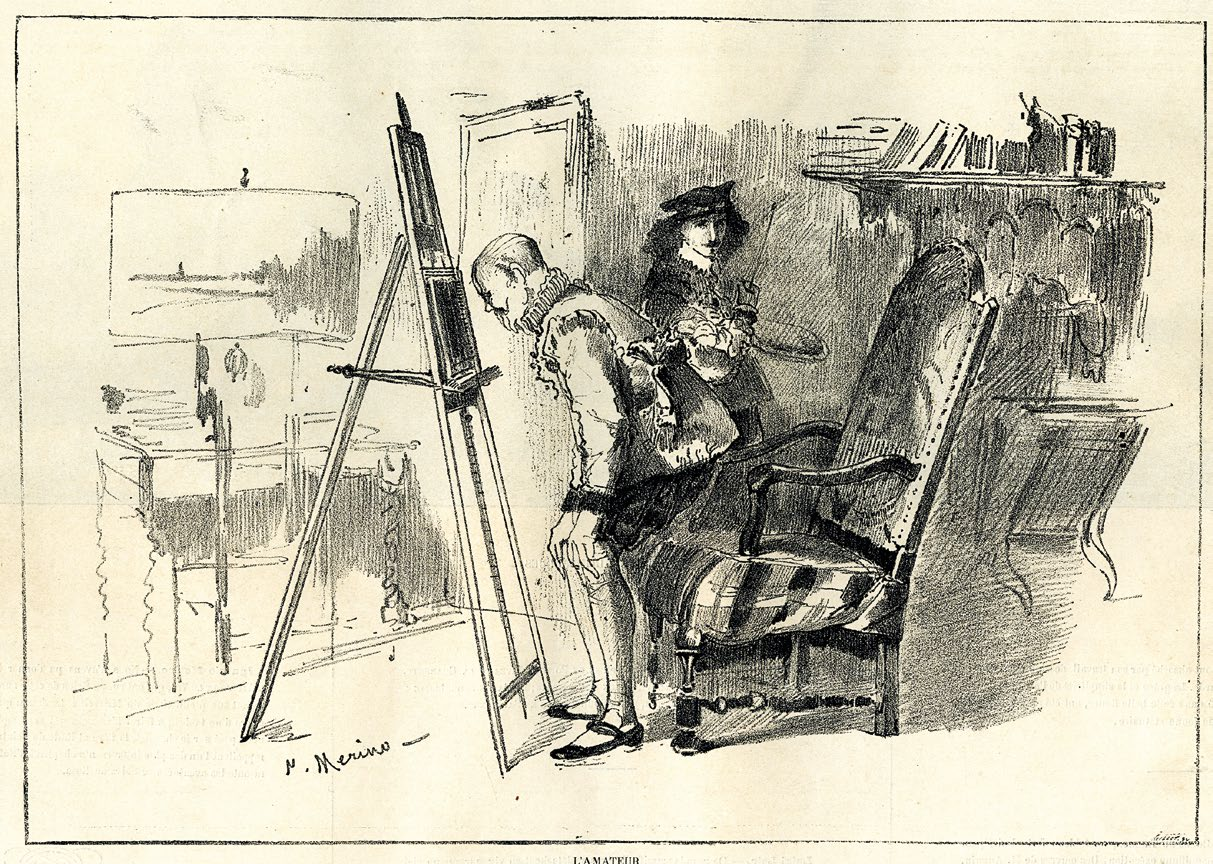
The Aficionado, 1868

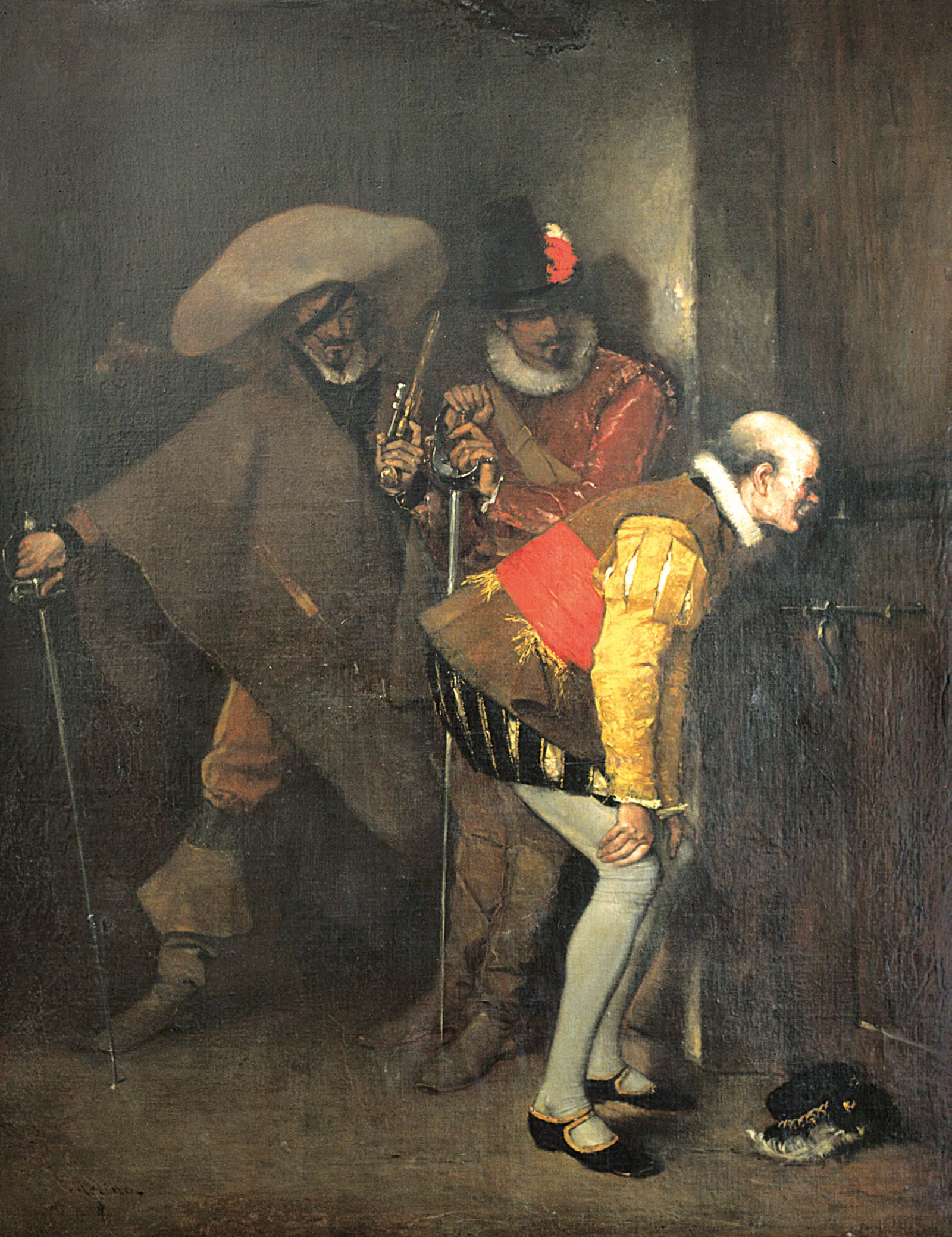
The Revenge of Mr. Cornaro, 1869

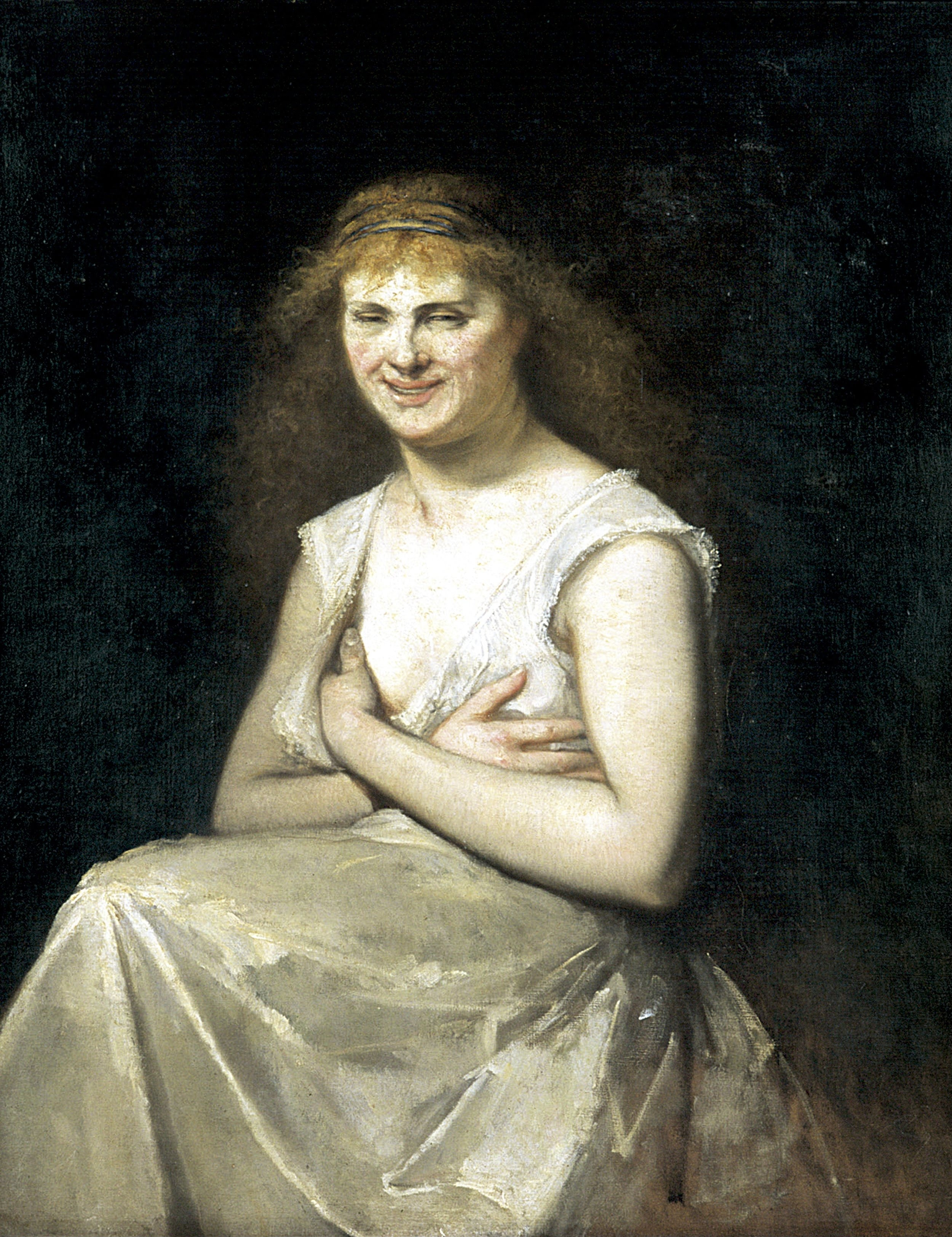
The Woman Who Laughs (The Crazy), c. 1870

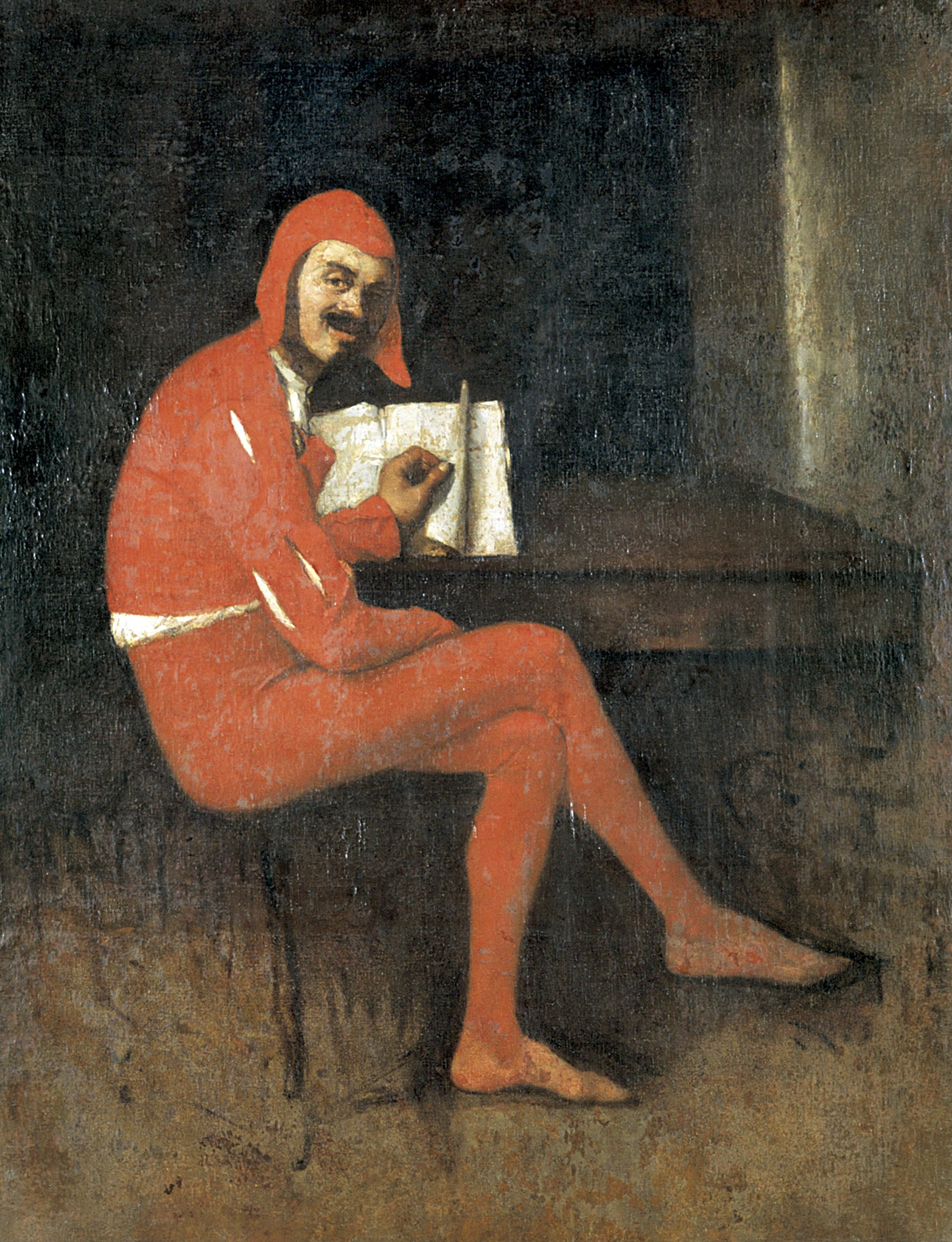
A Jester (Mephistopheles), 1870

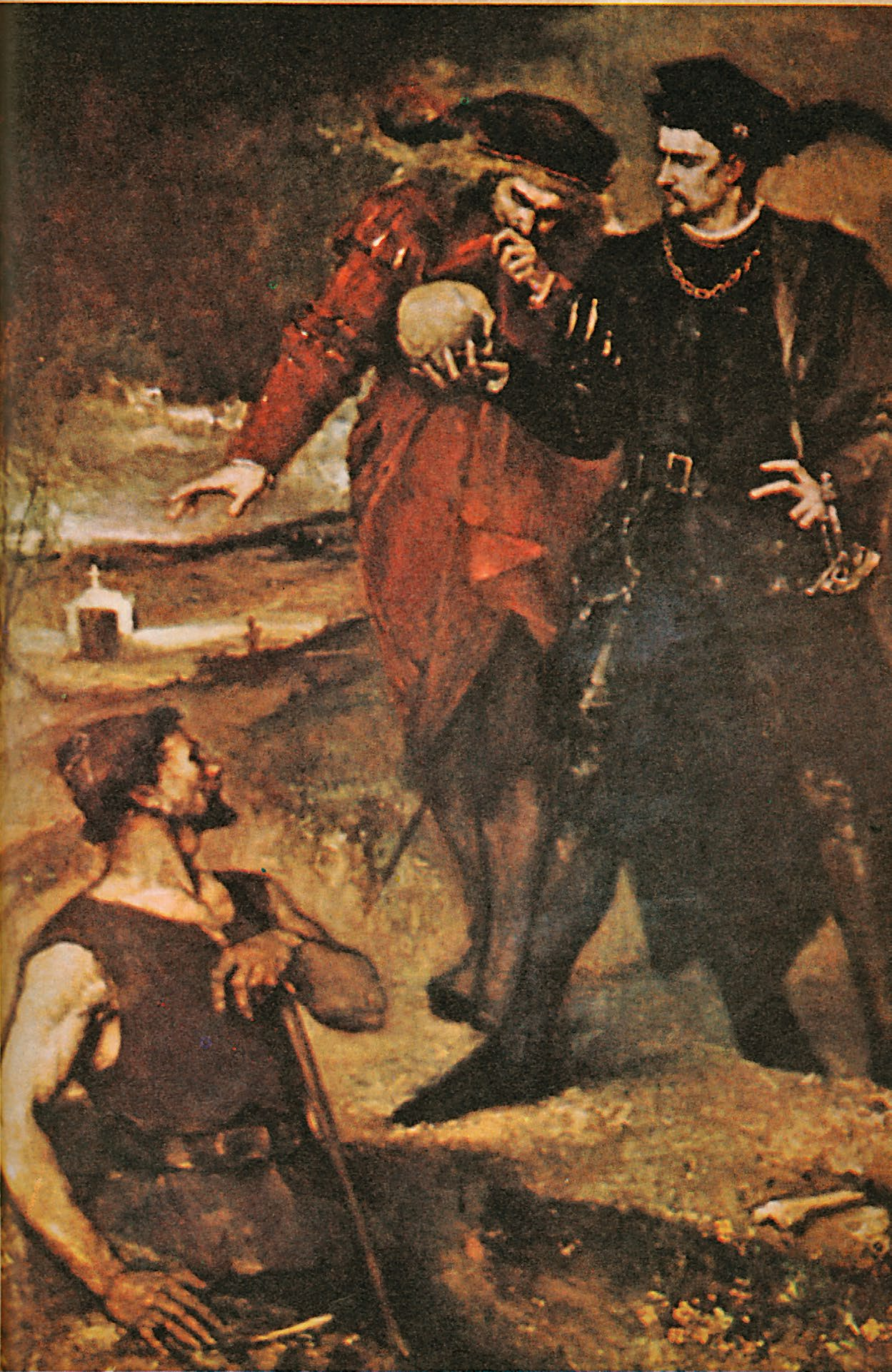
Hamlet, 1872

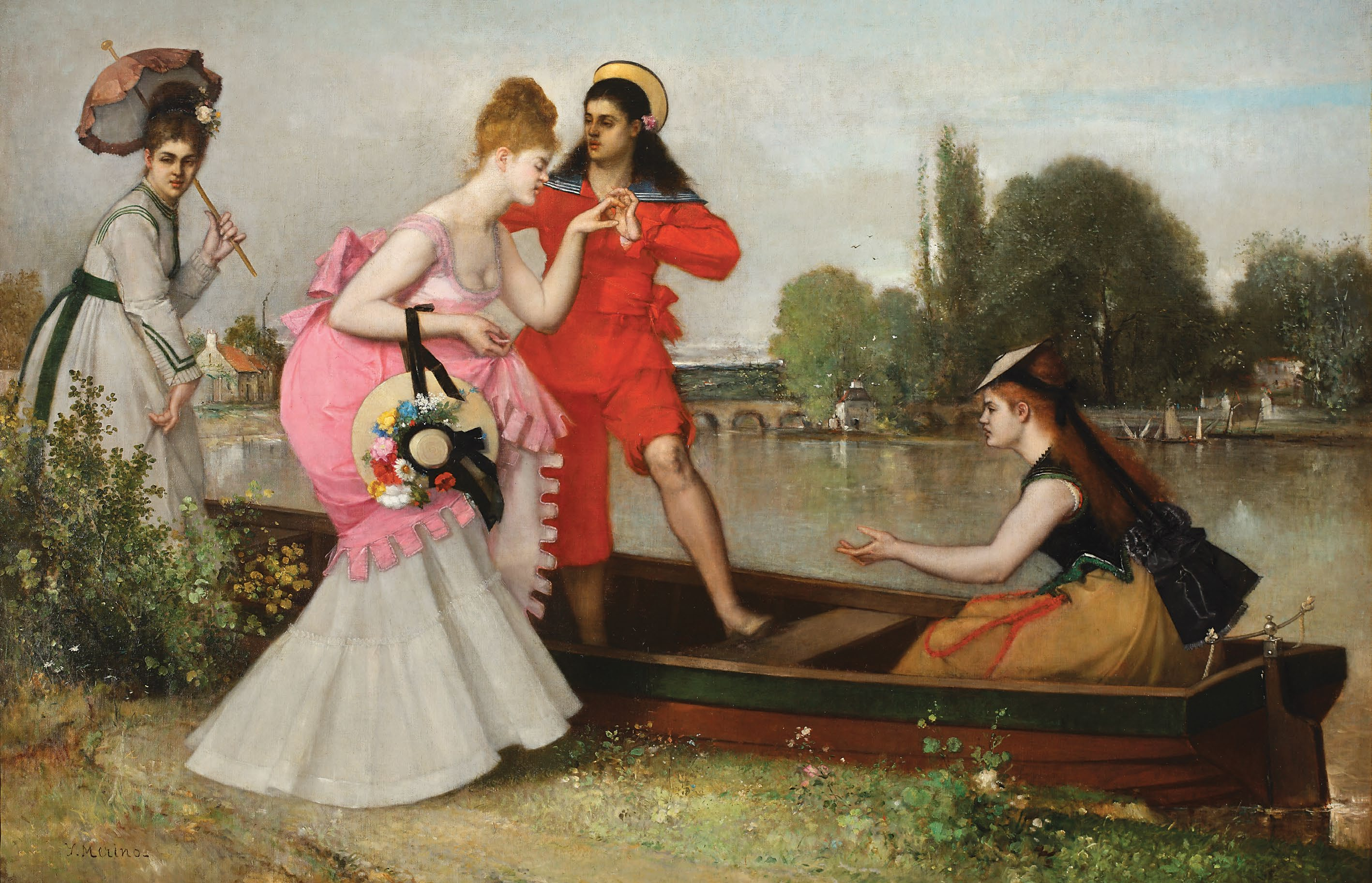
On the Boat, c. 1874
