= Francisco Laso =

Peruvian painter and politician

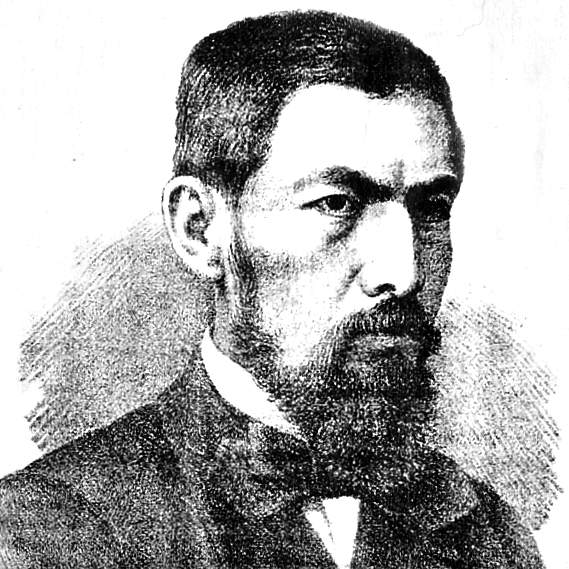
Francisco Laso. Engraving by Evaristo San Cristóval

José Francisco Domingo Laso de la Vega y de los Ríos (8 May 1823, Tacna - 14 May 1869, San Mateo District) was a Peruvian painter and politician. During his lifetime he was mostly known for his portraits, but is now better known for creating works that were precursors to indigenismo in art.

== Biography ==
He was born to an aristocratic colonial family. His father was Benito Laso one of Peru's founding fathers and, later, a government Minister. His mother Juana was the sister of the Marquis de Villahermosa de San José. When he was only seven, his mother died and the family moved to Arequipa, where his father remarried a year later.

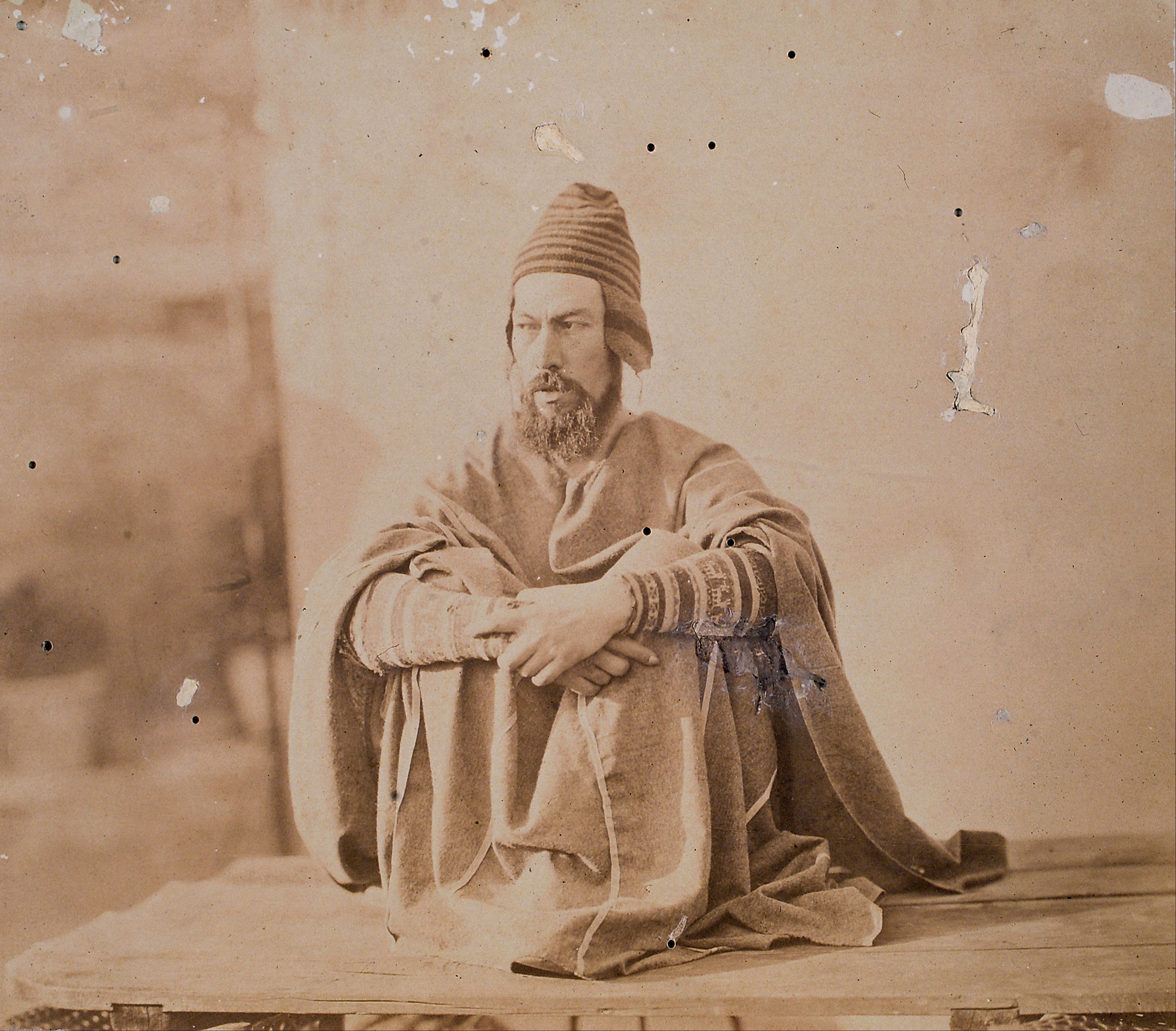
Laso in native attire (1868)

He attended the public schools, then went to Lima to study law, but quit after only a short time and enrolled at the Academy of Drawing and Painting. While there, he studied with Francisco Javier Cortés and met the Director, Ignacio Merino, who advised him to continue his studies in Europe.

He arrived in Paris in 1843 and found a position in the studios of the Swiss painter Charles Gleyre. Four years later, he went to Italy, visiting Rome, Florence and Venice. He was especially impressed by the works of Titian and Paolo Veronese. In 1849, he returned to Lima and opened his own studio. He also travelled throughout the Sierra and along the coast, painting works that depicted the life and customs of the region. He was able to make a second trip to Europe in 1851, thanks to a grant from the government. Once again, he worked with Gleyre, promoting his new interest for indigenous themes and exhibiting at the Exposition Universelle.

This time, when he went back to Peru in 1855, he settled in Arequipa and, at the request of Bishop (later Archbishop) José Sebastián de Goyeneche y Barreda, he painted several religious works. He also did portraits. In 1863, he was married and made another trip to Europe which lasted for three years.

Shortly after his return, he was a participant in the Battle of Callao, where he served as a firefighter. The following year, he was elected a Deputy to the "Congreso Constituyente". Once in office, he was attacked by anonymous critics, complaining that he had made a profit from the various grants that had allowed him to study in Europe. In an effort to silence them, he presented the government with three paintings.

An epidemic of yellow fever struck Lima in 1868, and he worked closely with the Red Cross in their campaign to eradicate it. His health was not up to the effort, however, and he caught the disease in 1869. He died near the village of San Mateo while being transferred to a mountain resort for treatment.

== Selected paintings ==
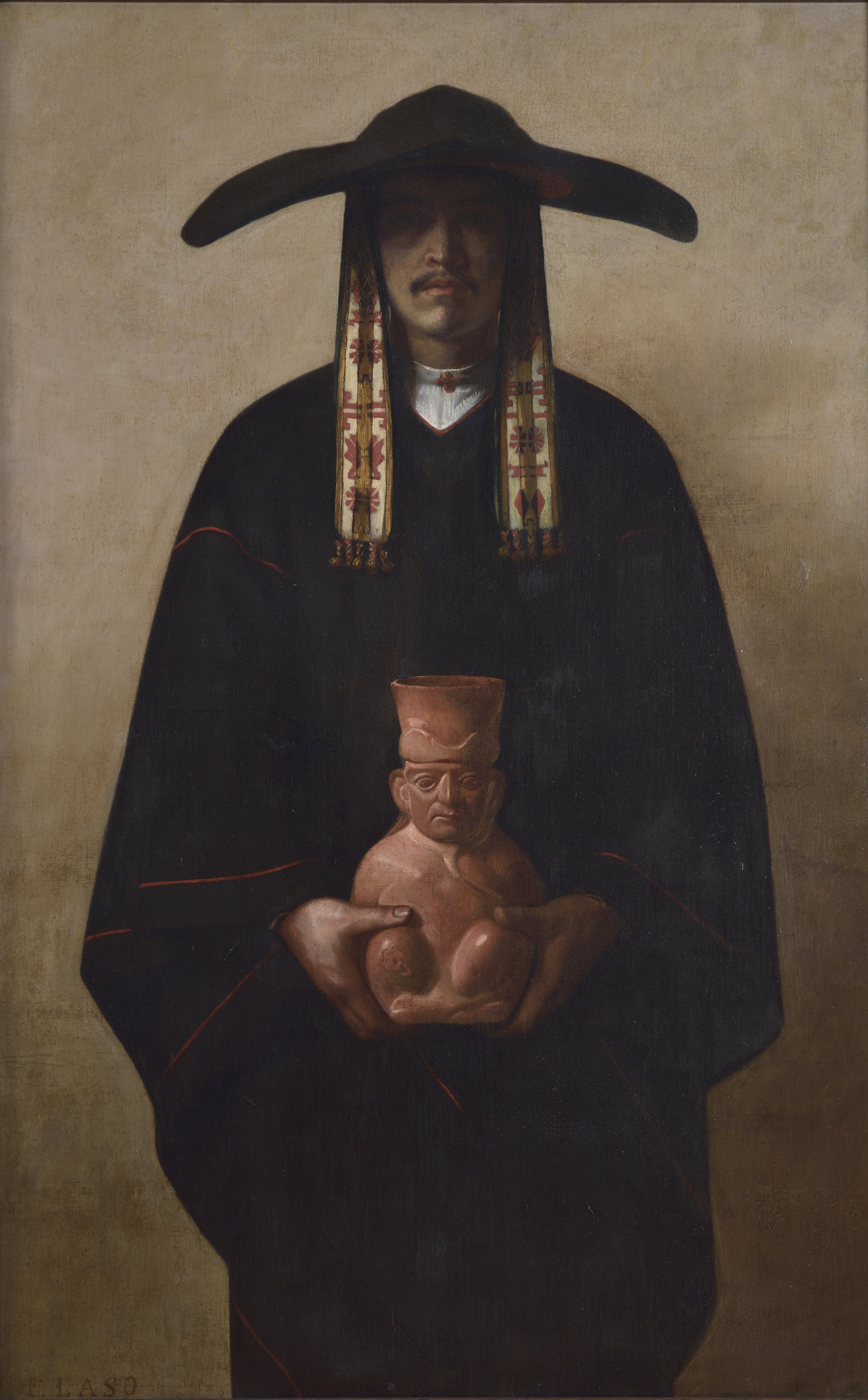
Indian Potter (1855)

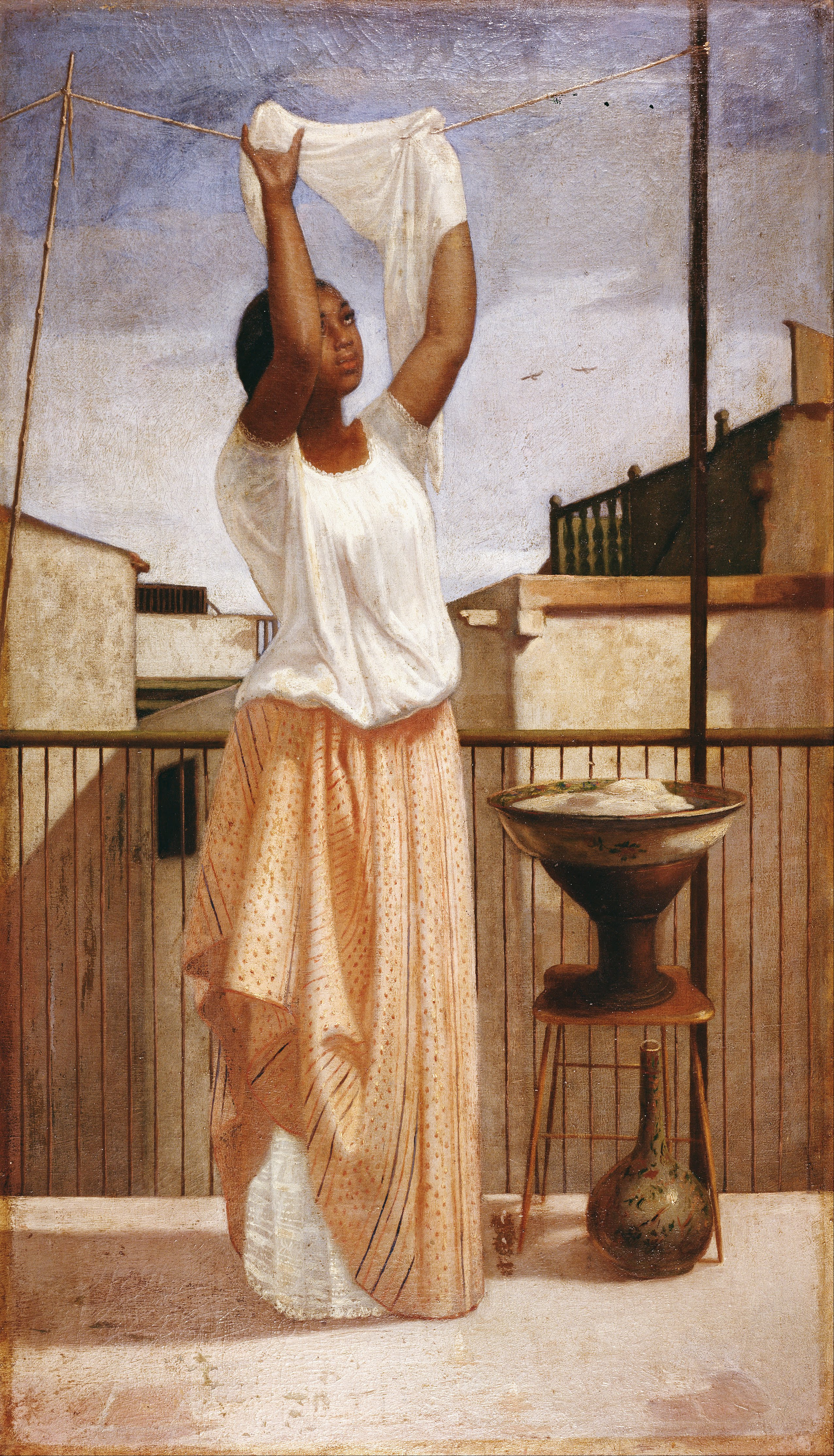
The Laundress (c.1858)

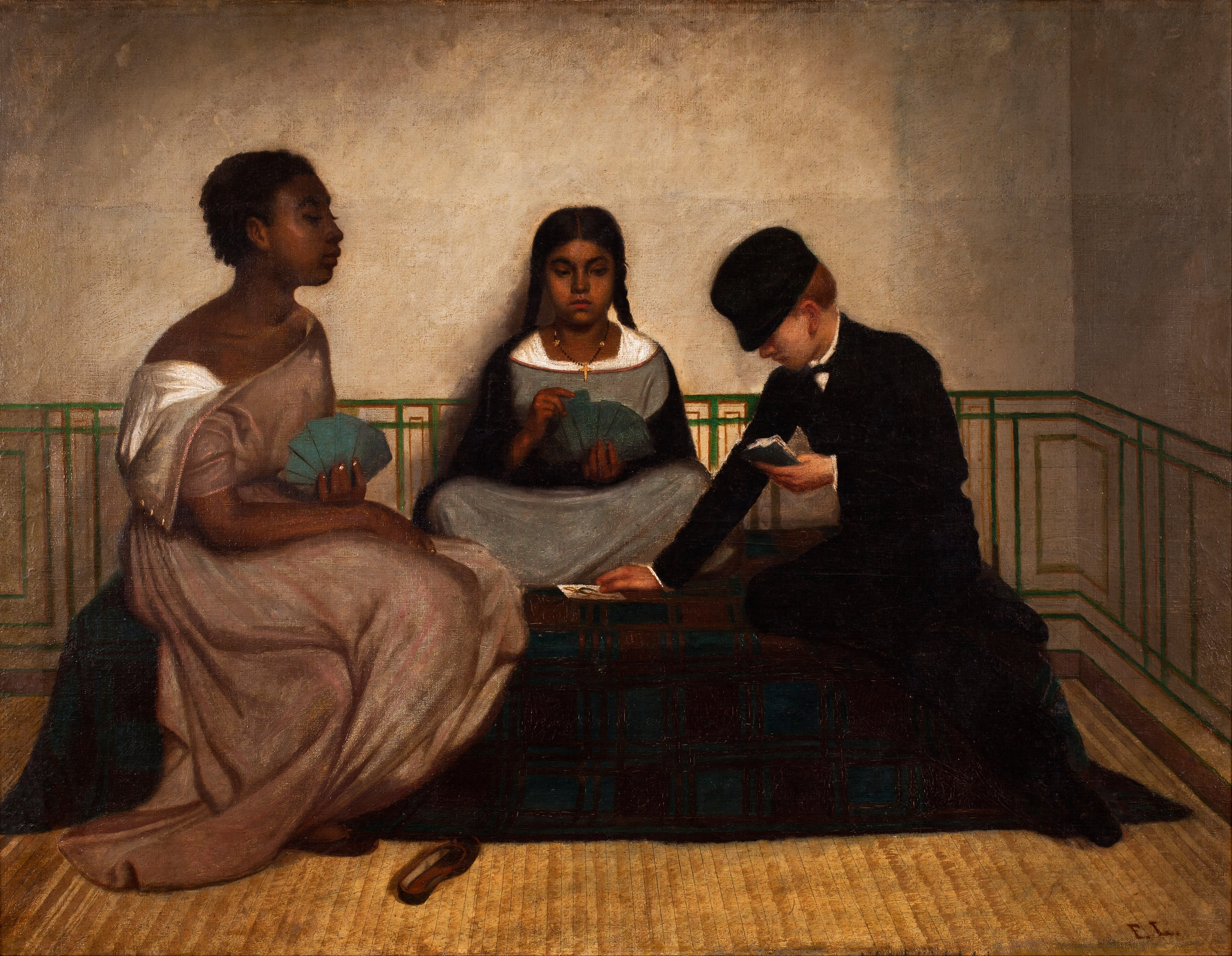
The Three Races (c.1859)

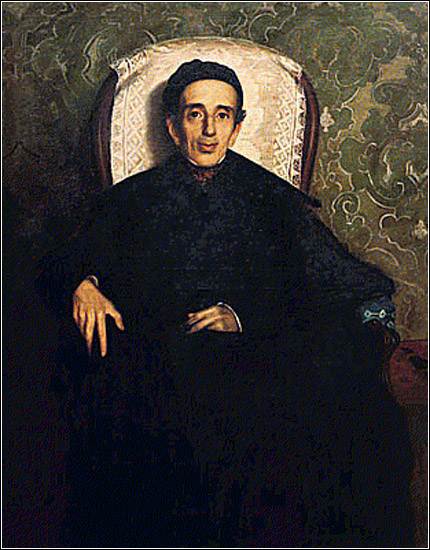
Portrait of Felipe Pardo y Aliaga (1860s)
