= Aurora San Cristóval =

Peruvian painter, lithographer and comic artist (1878–1955)

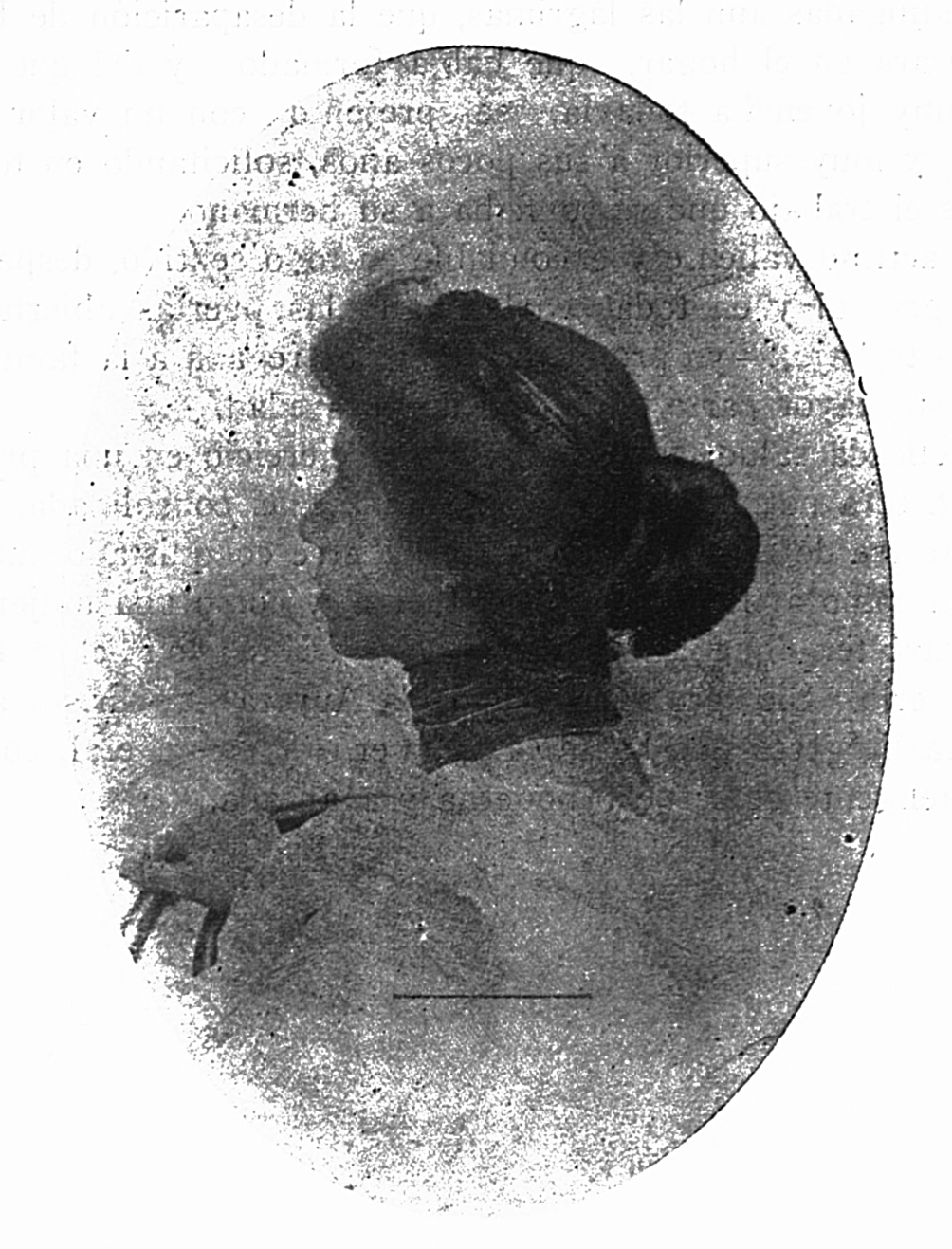
- San Cristóval in 1925
- Born: 1878; Lima, Peru
- Died: 17 May 1955 (aged 76–77)
- Occupations: Painter; lithographer; comic artist
- Father: Evaristo San Cristóval
- Relatives: Evaristo San Cristóval Palomino (brother)

Aurora San Cristóval Palomino (1878 – May 17, 1955) was a Peruvian painter, lithographer and comic artist. The only female lithographer active in late 19th century Lima, San Cristóval was the first Peruvian comics artist.

== Biography ==
Aurora San Cristóval was born in 1878 in Lima, the eldest of eight children of lithographer Evaristo San Cristóval and María Emilia Palomino. Her siblings included historian Evaristo San Cristóval Palomino.

Her father, a prolific magazine lithographer, was her teacher and collaborator. She published her first lithograph at the age of eleven in the 15 February 1890 issue of El Perú Ilustrado, "Sacsayhuaman wall in Cusco", an image of megalithic walls and cacti based on a book illustration. In the 1890s, she contributed a number of lithographs to El Perú Ilustrado, La Ilustración Americana, El Rimac, Revista Americana, and El Perú Artístico, including portraits of prominent Peruvians. A lithograph based on Guido Reni's painting Ecce Homo (1636) received particular praise.

From 1893 to 1895, she contributed twenty comic strips to El Perú Artístico. They were humorously themed, in a six panel format, and unlike her other work, signed with only her first name. These works make her the first known comics artist in Peru, and the only woman in Peru known to work in the medium until 1978.

She was eventually forced to give up printmaking for health reasons. San Cristóval died on 17 May 1955.
