= Evaristo San Cristóval =

Peruvian painter, illustrator and engraver

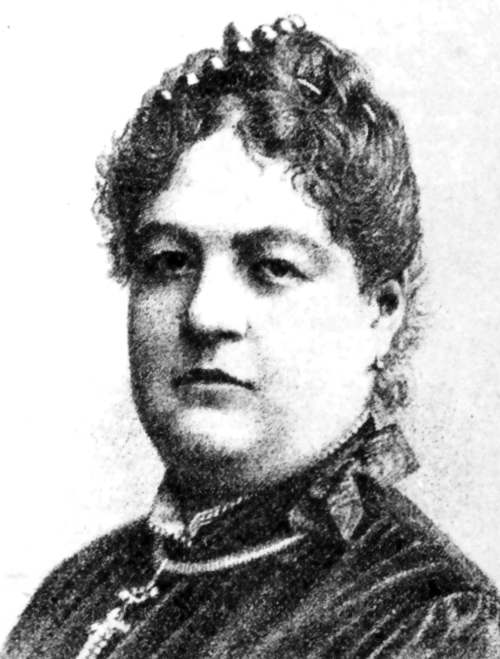
The novelist, Clorinda Matto de Turner

Two portraits from the Viceroys of Peru

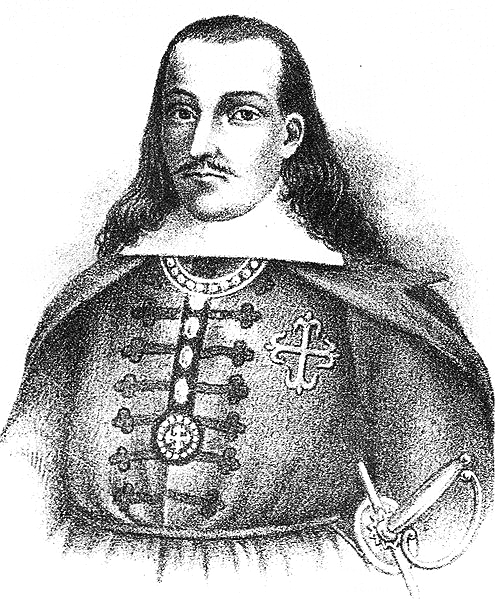
Melchor de Navarra, Duke of Palata

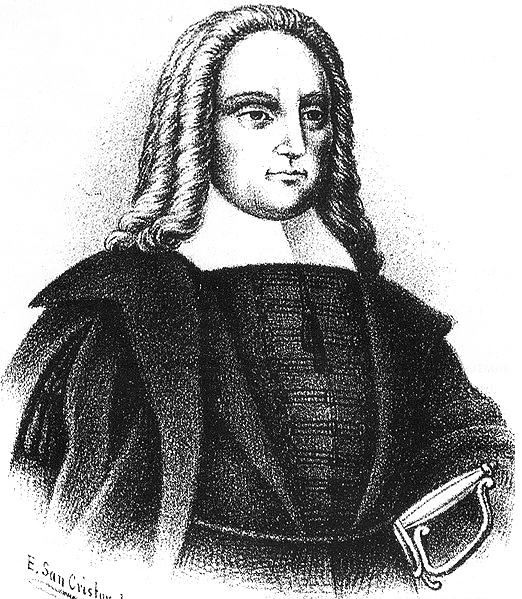
Carmine Caracciolo, 5th Prince of Santo Buono

Evaristo San Cristóval León (26 October 1848, Cerro de Pasco – 8 December 1900, Lima) was a Peruvian painter, illustrator, and engraver.

== Life and work ==
His father, Dionisio, was a member of the first Restorative Expedition during the War of the Confederation and, after its defeat, settled in the remote village of Cerro de Pasco, where he was employed in mining.

While still a young man, Evaristo moved to Lima, where he studied at the College of Our Lady of Guadalupe from 1863 to 1868. He was already working as a draftsman and produced such high-quality work that found employment helping to build the Central Railway of Peru. During the War of the Pacific, he served as a Major in the general staff of the army reserves.

Later, he taught himself lithography and, in 1887, set up his own workshop. His first commissions came from the Italian-born industrialist, Pedro Bacigalupi, who owned a printing press that was used to produce the magazine El Perú Ilustrado, which was launched the same year. His portrait engravings were considered the magazine's highlights. It was published until 1892.

He worked for several other publications as well; notably La Ilustración Americana (1890-1891), La Revista Americana (1891-1892), La Exposición de Lima (1892) and El Perú Artístico (1893-1894). He also served as the illustrator for some historical works; most famously, the Galería de los gobernadores y virreyes del Perú, by José Antonio de Lavalle, published in 1891, for which he produced a complete set of portraits depicting the Viceroys.

His portraits ran into the thousands; of prominent men and women. The exact number of his prints is unknown. He also did oil paintings, watercolors and portrait miniatures.

== Personal life ==
San Cristóval was the father of Evaristo San Cristóval Palomino, a historian, and Aurora San Cristóval, a painter, lithographer and comic artist.
