= René Schützenberger =

French painter (1860–1916)

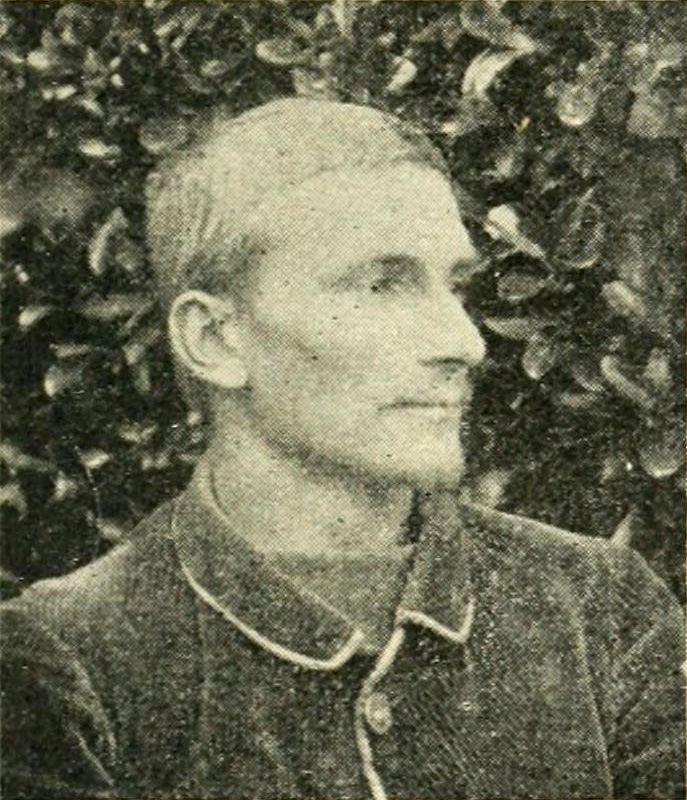
- René-Paul Schützenberger
- Born: 29 July 1860; Mulhouse
- Died: 31 December 1916 (aged 56); Paris
- Education: Académie Julian; Jean-Paul Laurens
- Movement: Post-Impressionism

René-Paul Schützenberger (29 July 1860 – 31 December 1916) was a French Post-Impressionist painter.

== Biography ==
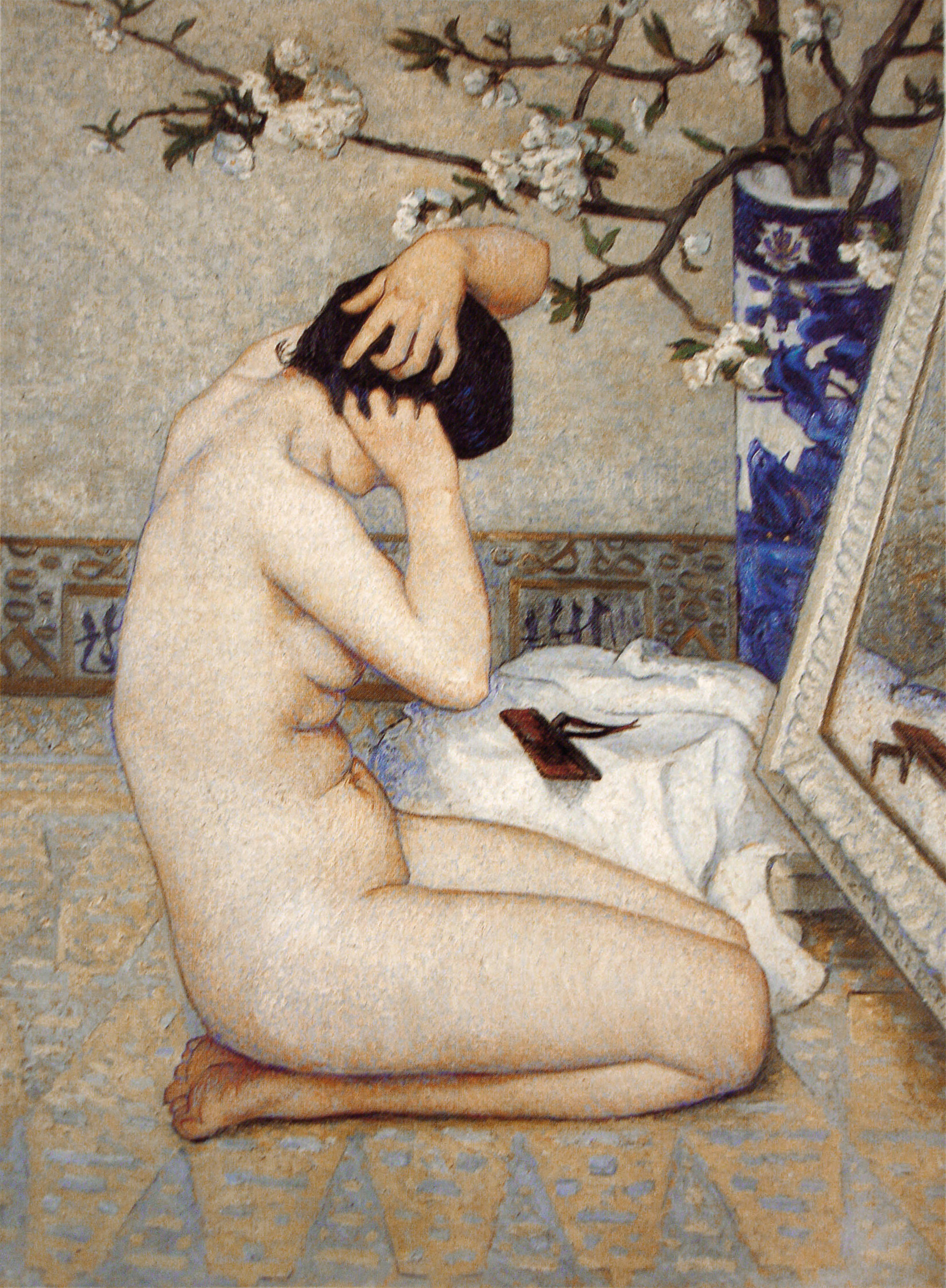
The Head-dress (1911)

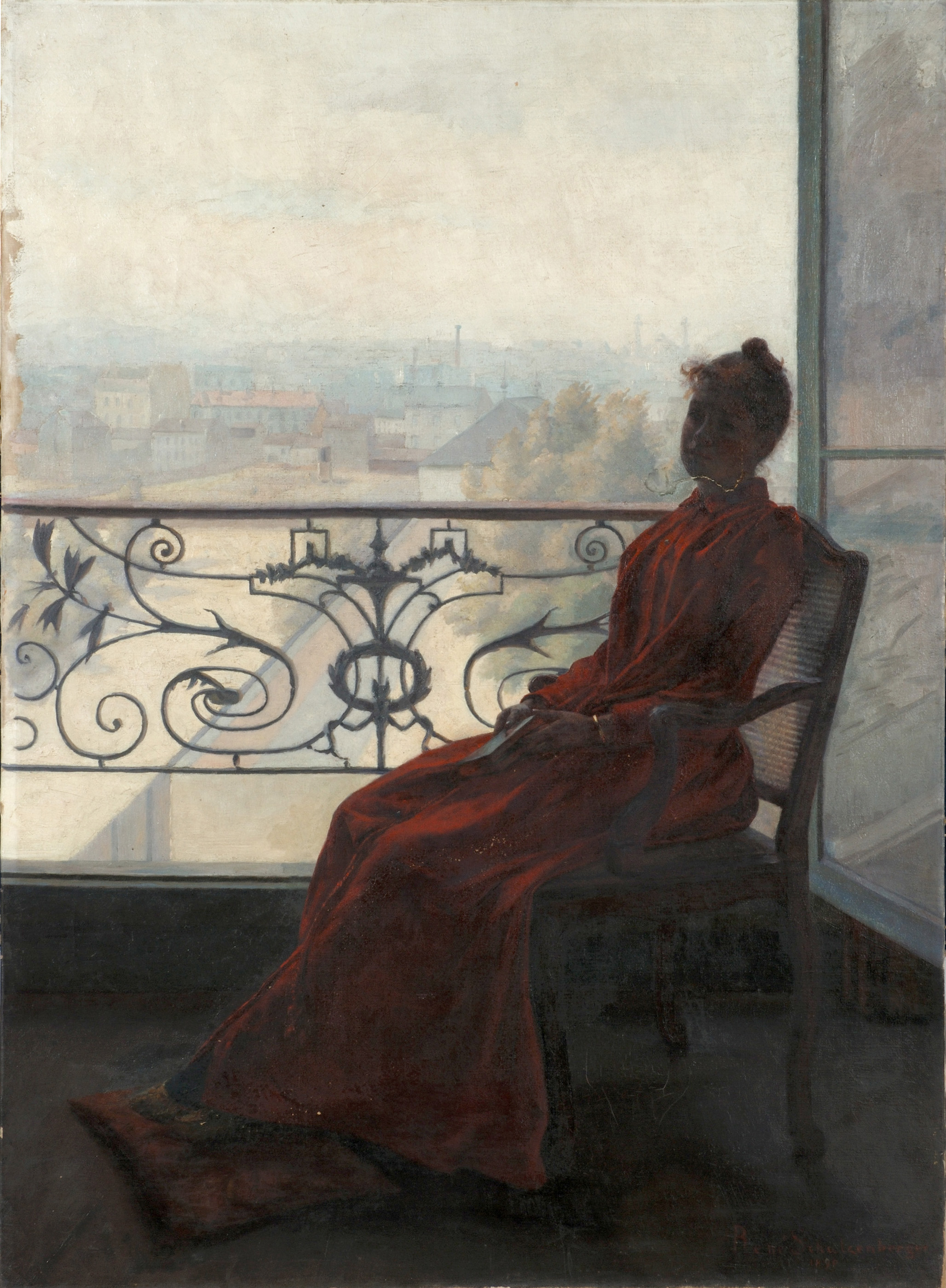
Reader at the Window (1890), Soissons Museum

Born in Mulhouse, into an Alsatian family of famous brewers, he was the son of Paul Schützenberger (1829–1897), a French chemist. The painter Louis-Frédéric Schützenberger (1825–1903) was his cousin.

Schützenberger studied at the Académie Julian, a private art school founded by Rodolphe Julian under Jean-Paul Laurens.

In 1891, he married Andrée-Marie Bouland in the town hall of the 6th arrondissement of Paris. She was a writer and an art critique known as Andrée Myra.

Schützenberger started to exhibit at the Salon des Artistes Français in 1889, at the Salon des Indépendants from 1902 and at the Société Nationale des Beaux-Arts from 1907. He got an honourable mention at the Salon of 1897 and at the Universal Exhibition of 1900.

In 1911, Schützenberger exhibited at the Exposition des Peintres du Paris moderne in the Gallery Georges Petit.

In 1912 and in 1915, he participated in the Exposition of group of artists called Cent Artistes in the Gallery Henri Manuel. He died in Paris on 31 December 1916.

He practiced genre painting, portraits, nudes and landscapes, treating the subjects of the daily life and intimate subjects. His style is close to the Post-Impressionism movement and was influenced by the Les Nabis group of Post-Impressionists, most of whom also studied at Académie Julian.

Retrospective exhibition Salon des Indépendants took place in 1926. Works by René Schützenberger were exhibited at Grand Palais along with works by Paul Cézanne, Vincent van Gogh, Amedeo Modigliani, Georges Seurat, Henri de Toulouse-Lautrec, Félix Vallotton and other painters.

== Works ==
- In Front of Window - 1887
- The Old Sailor - 1889
- Veuve et orpheline - Salon des Beaux-Arts of 1889 (n°2446)
- Le Chapeau du dimanche - Salon des Beaux-Arts of 1889 (n°2447)
- Les Loisirs du vieux marin - Salon des Beaux-Arts of 1890 (n°2180)
- Sur la plage - Salon des Beaux-Arts of 1890 (n°2181)
- Reader at the Window, 1890, Salon of 1891 (n°1509) (Soissons Museum)
- Christ and Madeleine - 1890, Salon des Beaux-Arts of 1891 (n°1510)
- Portrait of a Woman in black - 1894
- Woman in white - Salon of 1895 (n°1730)
- Jeunesse - Salon des Beaux-Arts 1896 (n°1806)
- Madeleine at the Tumb - Salon des Beaux-Arts de Lyon 1898 (n°622)
- The Mill of the Wine Press - Salon des Beaux-Arts de Lyon 1898 (n°623)
- Farniente - Salon des Beaux-Arts 1899 (n°1785)
- Portrait - Exposition Universelle of 1900 (n°1760)
- Labour - Salon des Indépendants of 1905 (n°3732)
- Quatre vues de Bruges - Salon des Indépendants of 1906 (n°4546)
- Le Mur du séminaire, Bruges (appartient a Mlle Nachmann) - Salon des Indépendants of 1906 (n°4548)
- Le Quai des Meuniers (Bruges) - Salon des Indépendants of 1906 (n°4549)
- Le Quai vert (Bruges) - Salon des Indépendants of 1906 (n°4550)
- Le Dyver (Bruges) - Salon des Indépendants of 1906 (n°4551)
- Le Béguinage (Bruges) - Salon des Indépendants of 1906 (n°4552)
- Le Marché St-Jacques (Bruges) - Salon des Indépendants of 1906 (n°4553)
- Before the Tub - Salon de la Société Nationale des Beaux-Arts 1906, (n°1099)
- Enigma - Salon de la Société Nationale des Beaux-Arts 1907 (n°1073)
- Dress - Société des Amis des Arts de Nantes, 1907 (n°299)
- Tears in the Eyes - Salon de la Société Nationale des Beaux-Arts 1908 (n°1045)
- Le Plateau - Salon des Indépendants of 1909 (n°1439)
- Le Puits - Salon des Indépendants of 1909 (n°1440)
- The Battle - Salon de la Société Nationale des Beaux-Arts 1910
- Playing at Dice (1910) - Salon de la Société Nationale des Beaux-Arts 1911 (n°1154)
- The Head-dress - Salon de la Société Nationale des Beaux-Arts 1911 (n°1156)
- Vail of Hair (1911) - Salon de la Société Nationale des Beaux-Arts 1912 (n°1162)
- The Flowery Folding-screen (1911)- Salon de la Société Nationale des Beaux-Arts 1912 (n°1161)
- Woman and Flower - Salon de la Société Nationale des Beaux-Arts 1913 (n°1137)
- The Jade Necklace - Salon de la Société Nationale des Beaux-Arts 1914 (n°1084)
- The Perfume - Salon de la Société Nationale des Beaux-Arts 1914 (n°1083)

== Paintings ==
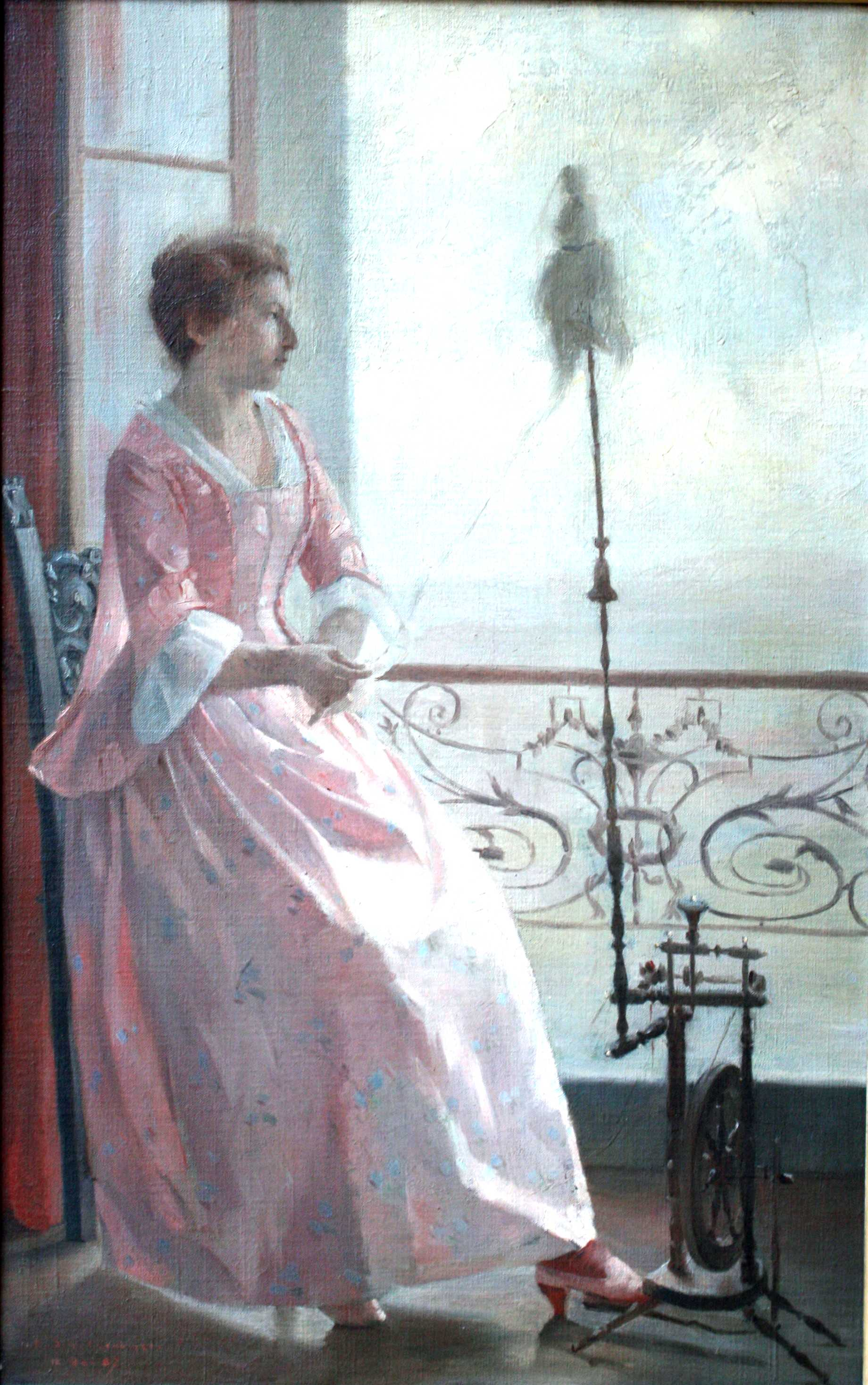
In Front of the Window (12 May, 1887)

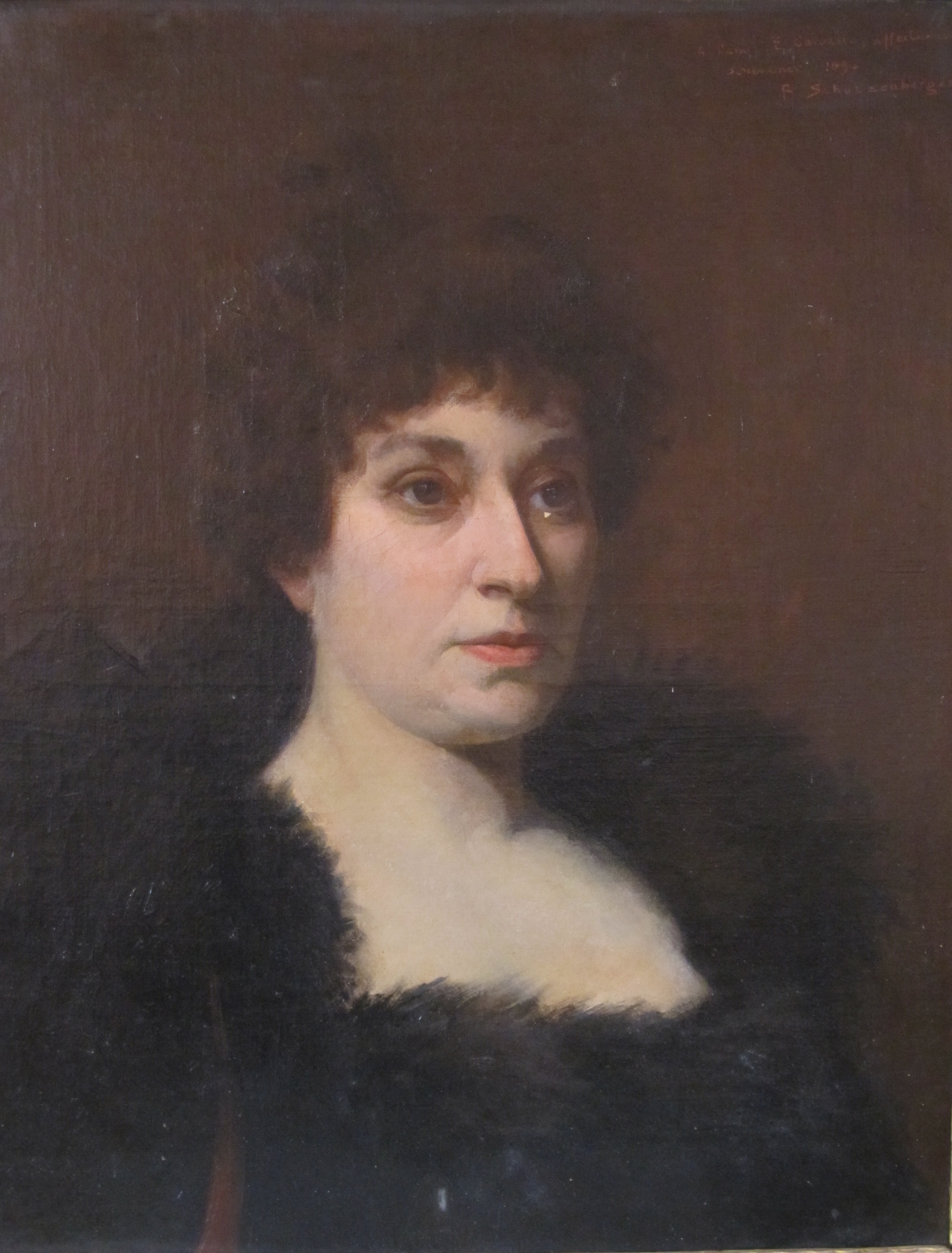
Portrait of a Woman in Black (1894)

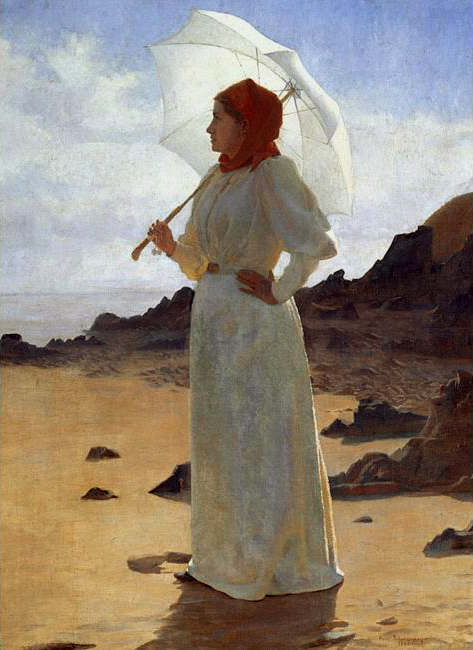
Woman in white (1895)

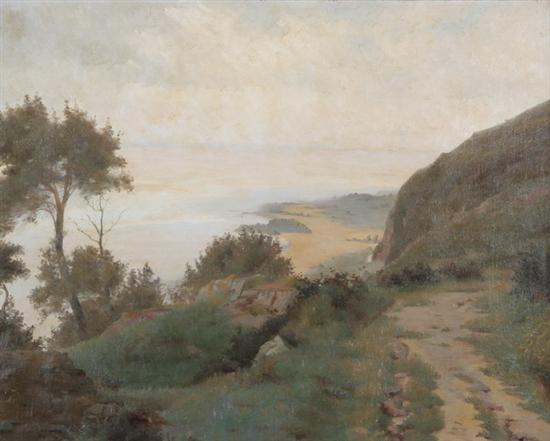
Overlooking the Sea (1896)

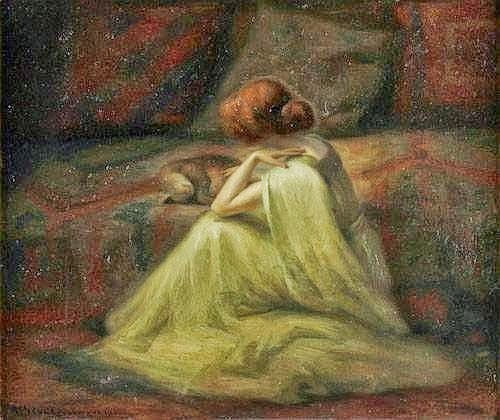
An Elegant Lady caressing her Cat (1904)

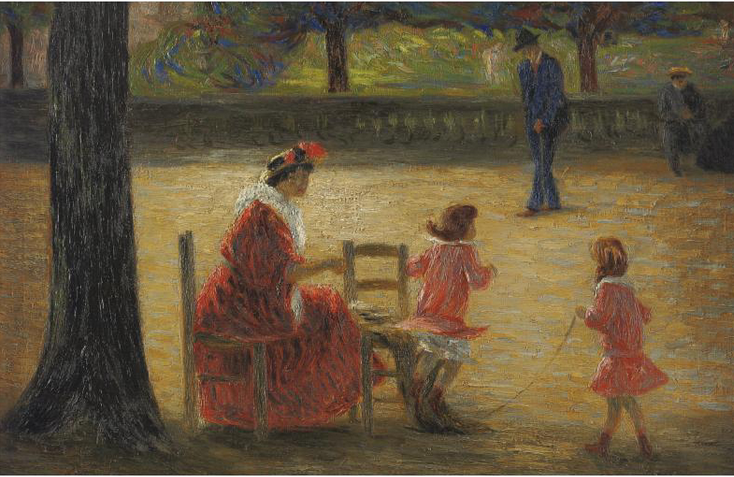
Au Jardin Du Luxembourg (1908)

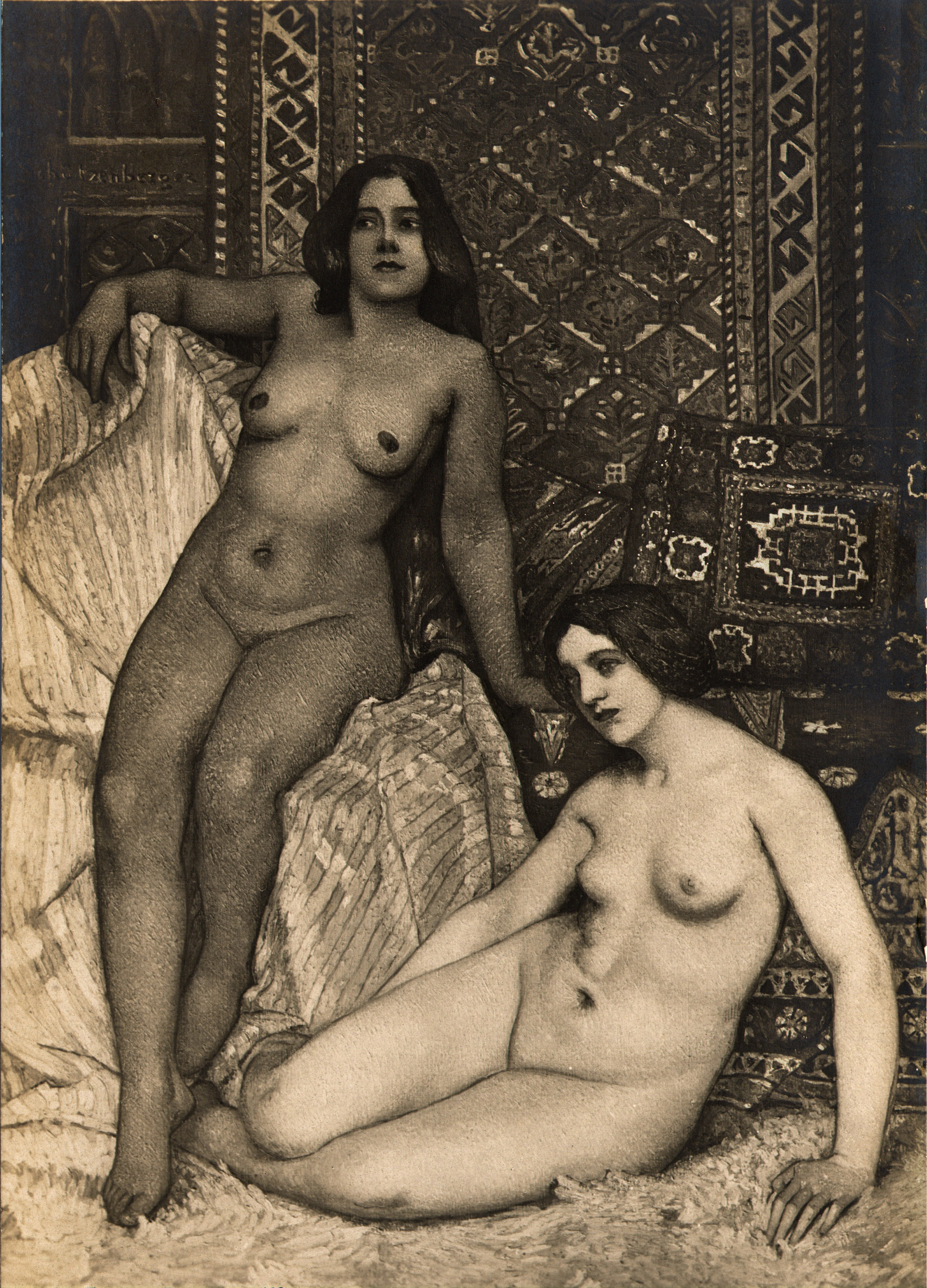
The Battle (1909)

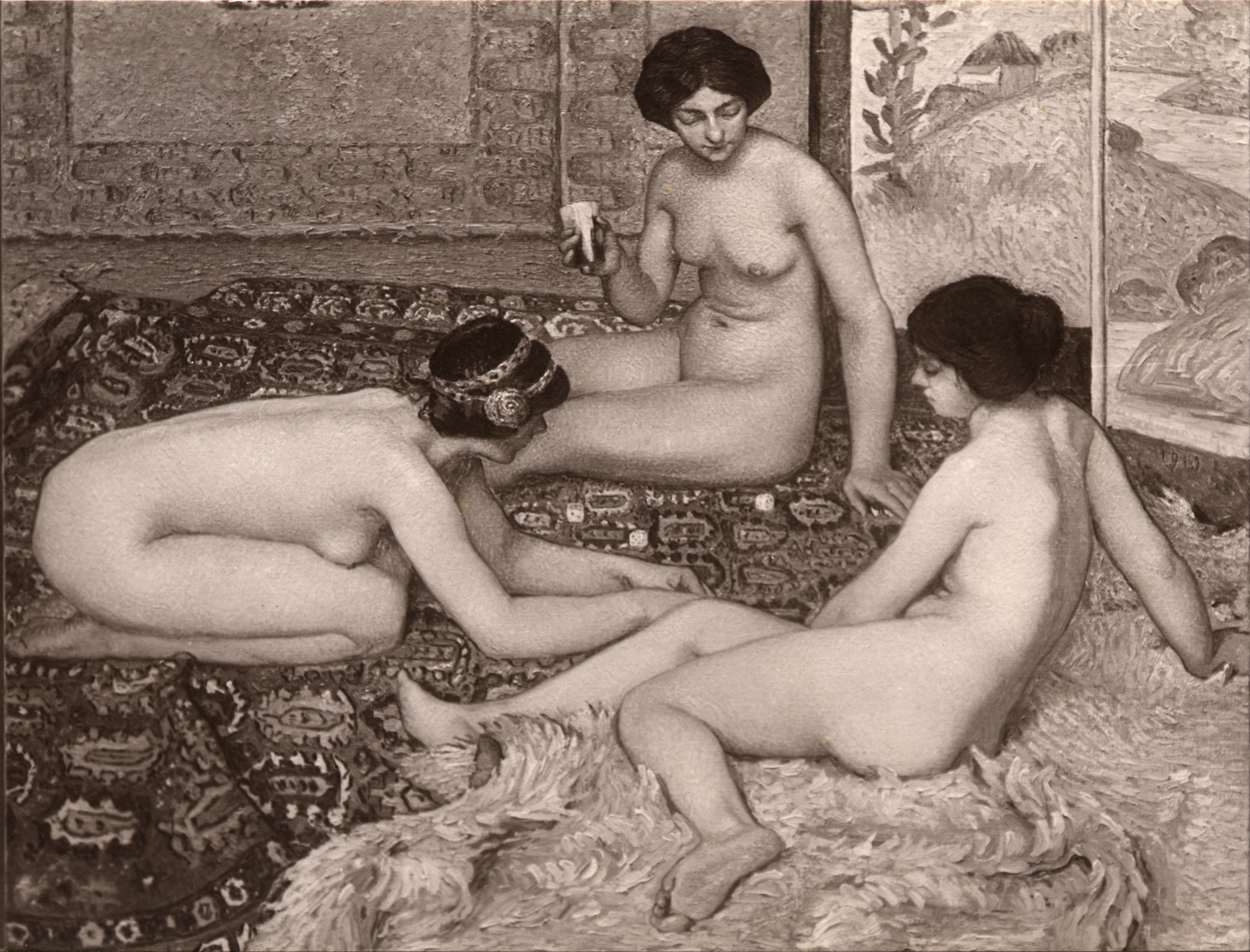
Playing at Dice (1910)

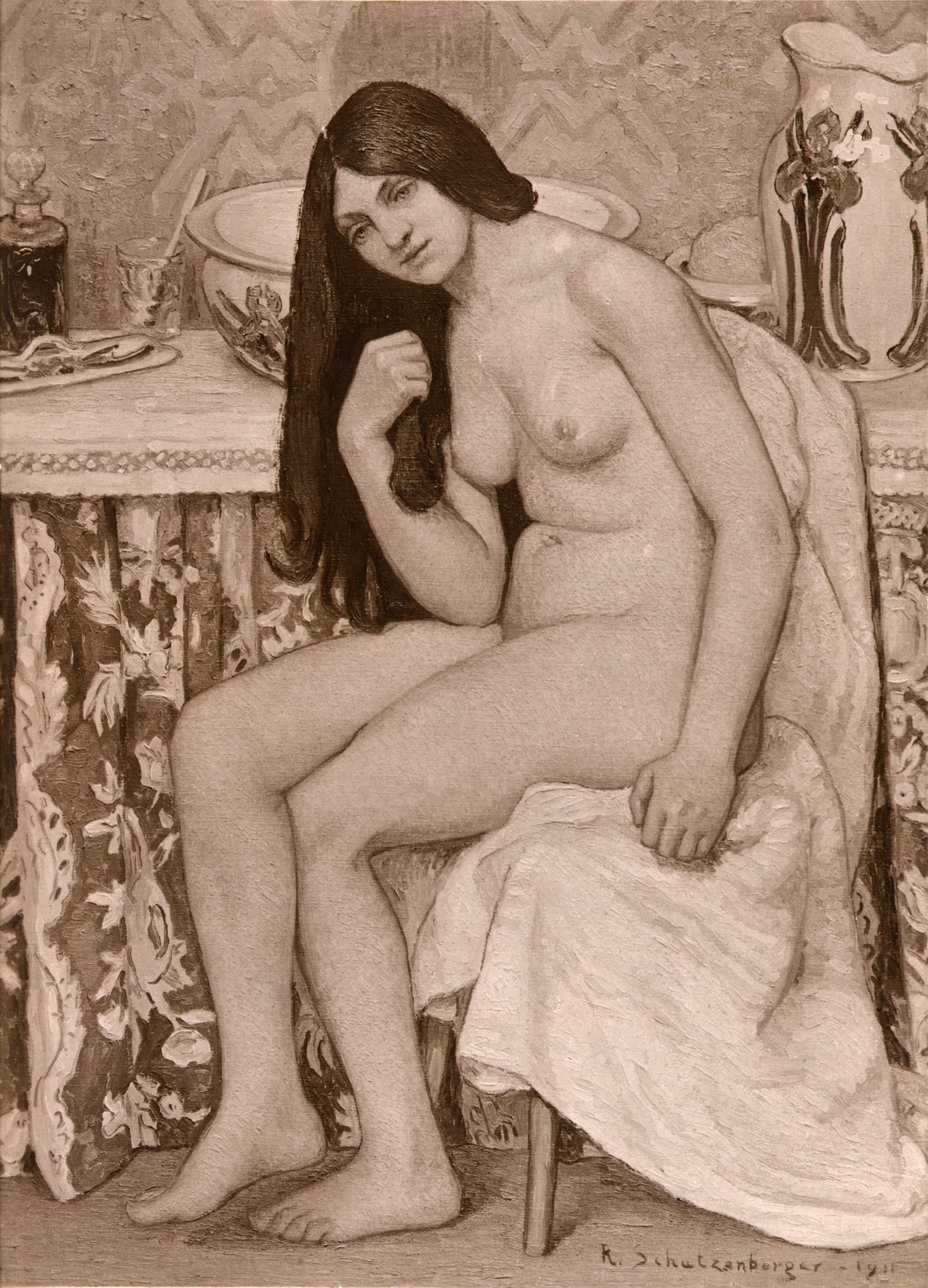
Vail of Hair (1911)

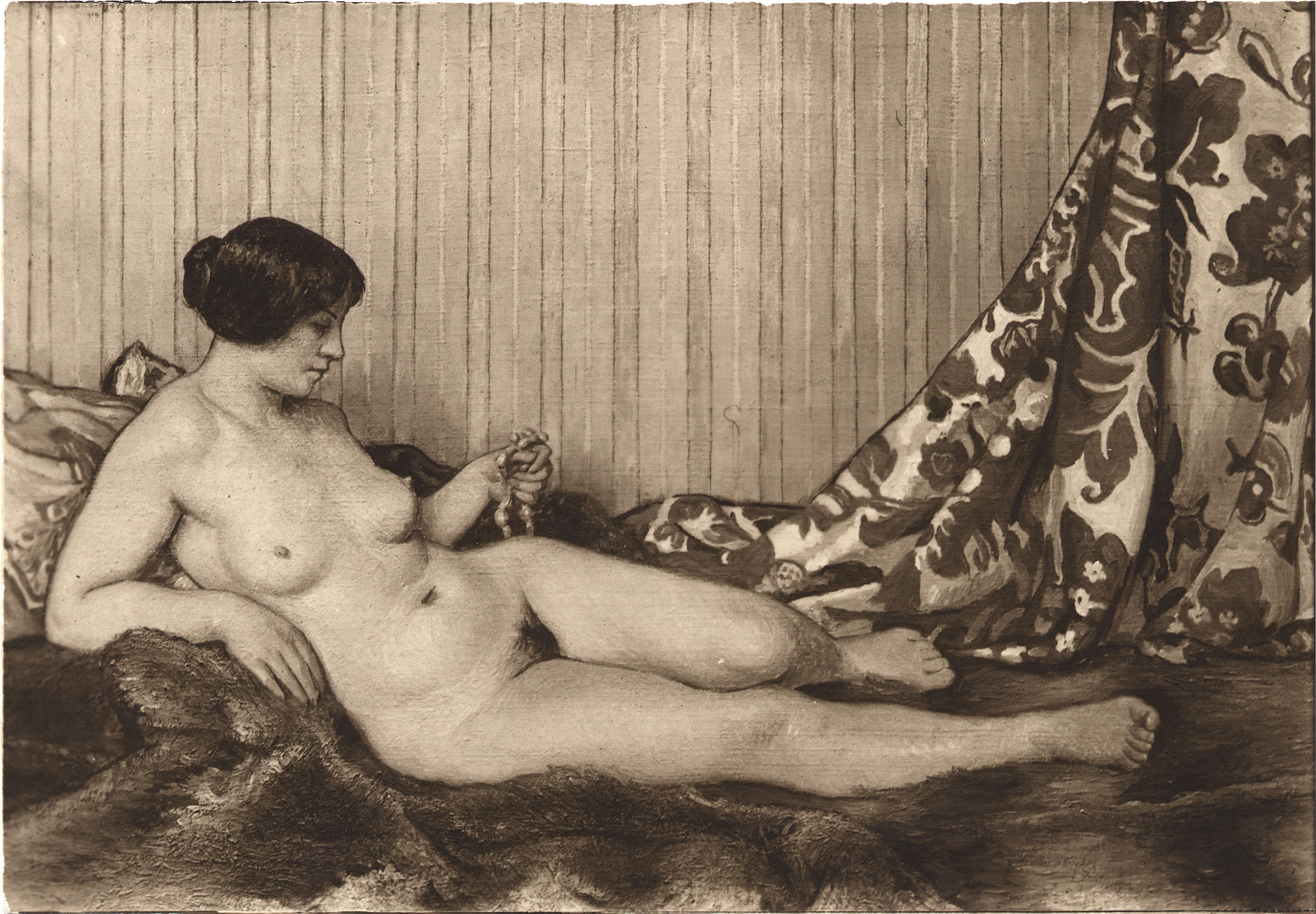
The Jade Necklace (1914)

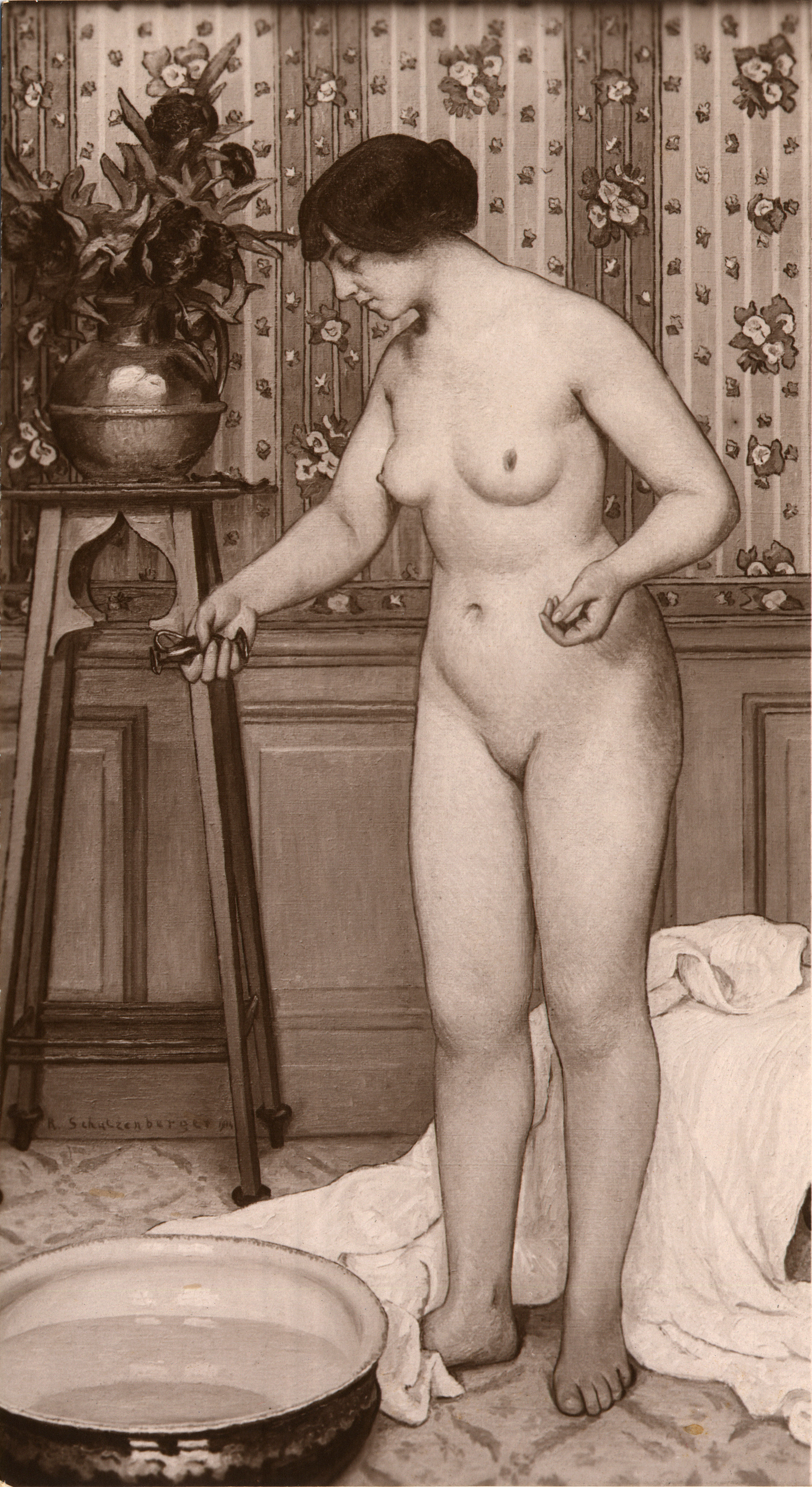
The Perfume (1914)

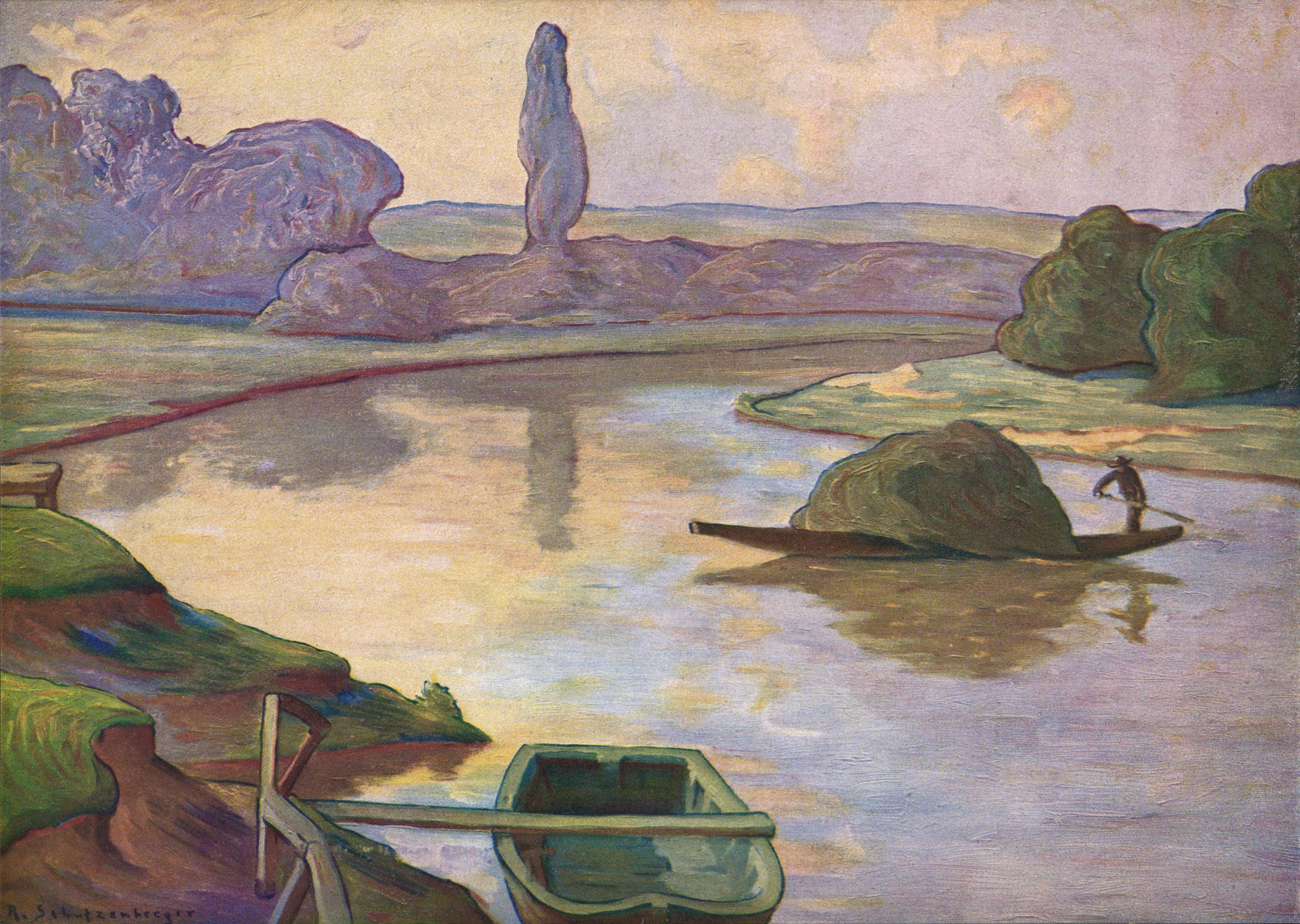
Islands in the Rhine river near to Strasbourg (c.1915)

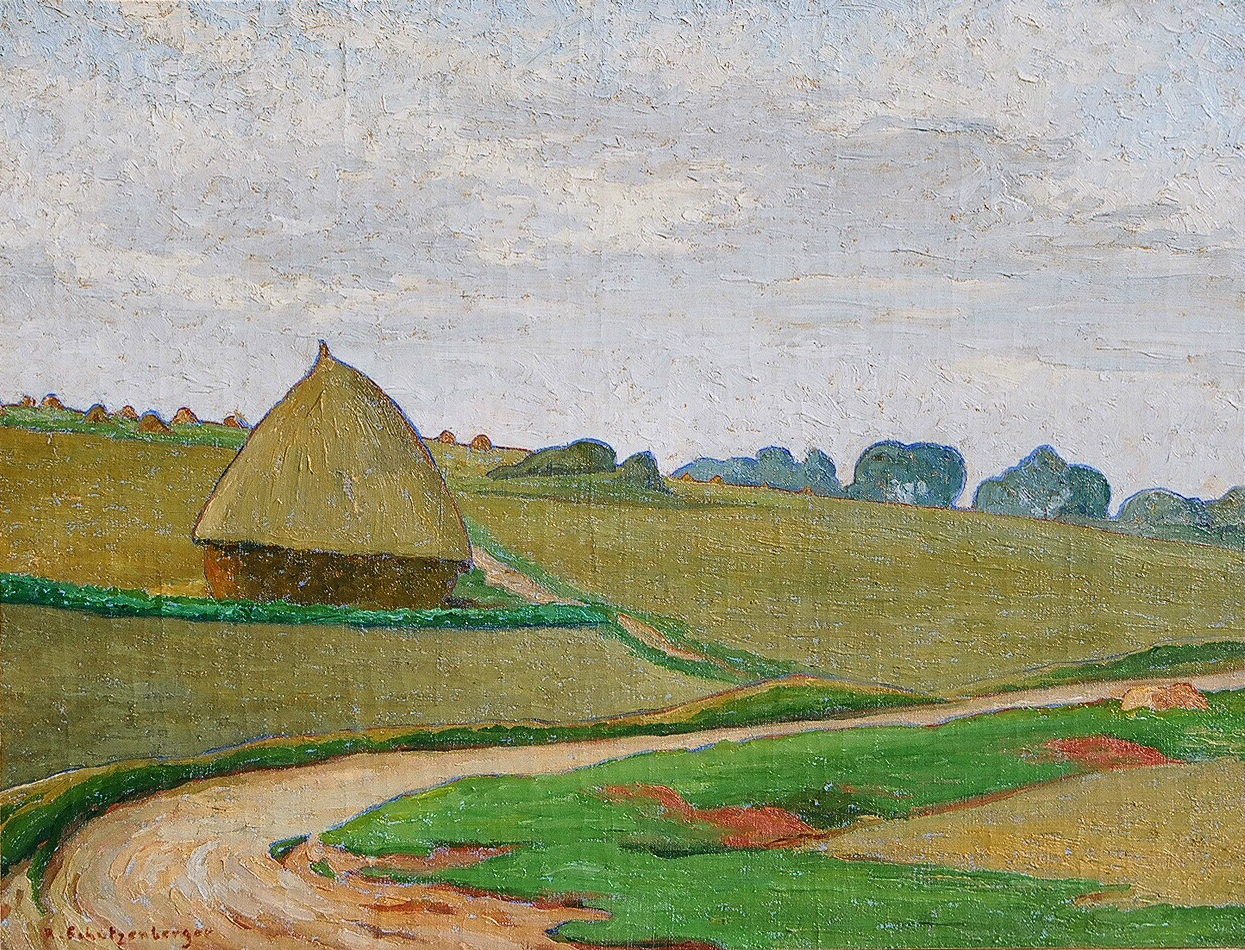
Landscape with a Rock (c.1915)

== References and sources ==
Sources

- Jules Martin, Nos peintres et nos sculpteurs, Paris Flammarion, 1897.
- Catalogue du Salon de la Société lyonnaise des Beaux-Arts, 1898.
- Catalogue général officiel de l'Exposition Internationale Universelle de 1900, Paris.
- Catalogue du Salon de la Société des Amis des Arts de Nantes, 1907.
- L'Art et les Artistes, 7ème année, n°75, juin 1911.
- The Julian Academy, Paris 1868–1939, Spring Exhibition 1989, Sheperd Gallery, New York.
- Benezit, Dictionnaire des artistes, 1999.
- Dominique Lobstein, Dictionnaire des Indépendants (1884–1914), tome III, L'Échelle de Jacob, 2003.
- Gaïte Dugnat, Les catalogues des Salons de la Société Nationale des Beaux-Arts, tome III (1906–1910), L'Échelle de Jacob, 2005.
- Gaïte Dugnat, Les catalogues des Salons de la Société Nationale des Beaux-Arts, tome IV(1911–1920), L'Échelle de Jacob, 2005.
- Paul-René Schützenberger File, Documentation du Musée d'Orsay, Paris.
