= Louis-Frédéric Schützenberger =

French painter

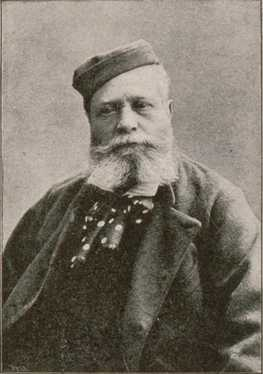
- Louis Schützenberger
- Born: September 8, 1825; Strasbourg, Kingdom of France
- Died: April 17, 1903; Straßburg, German Empire
- Education: École nationale supérieure des Beaux-Arts; Paul Delaroche; Marc-Charles-Gabriel Gleyre
- Known for: Painter
- Movement: Realism
- Awards: Legion of Honour – Chevalier

Louis-Frédéric Schützenberger (Strasbourg September 8, 1825, Strasbourg April 17, 1903) was a German-French painter.

== Biography ==
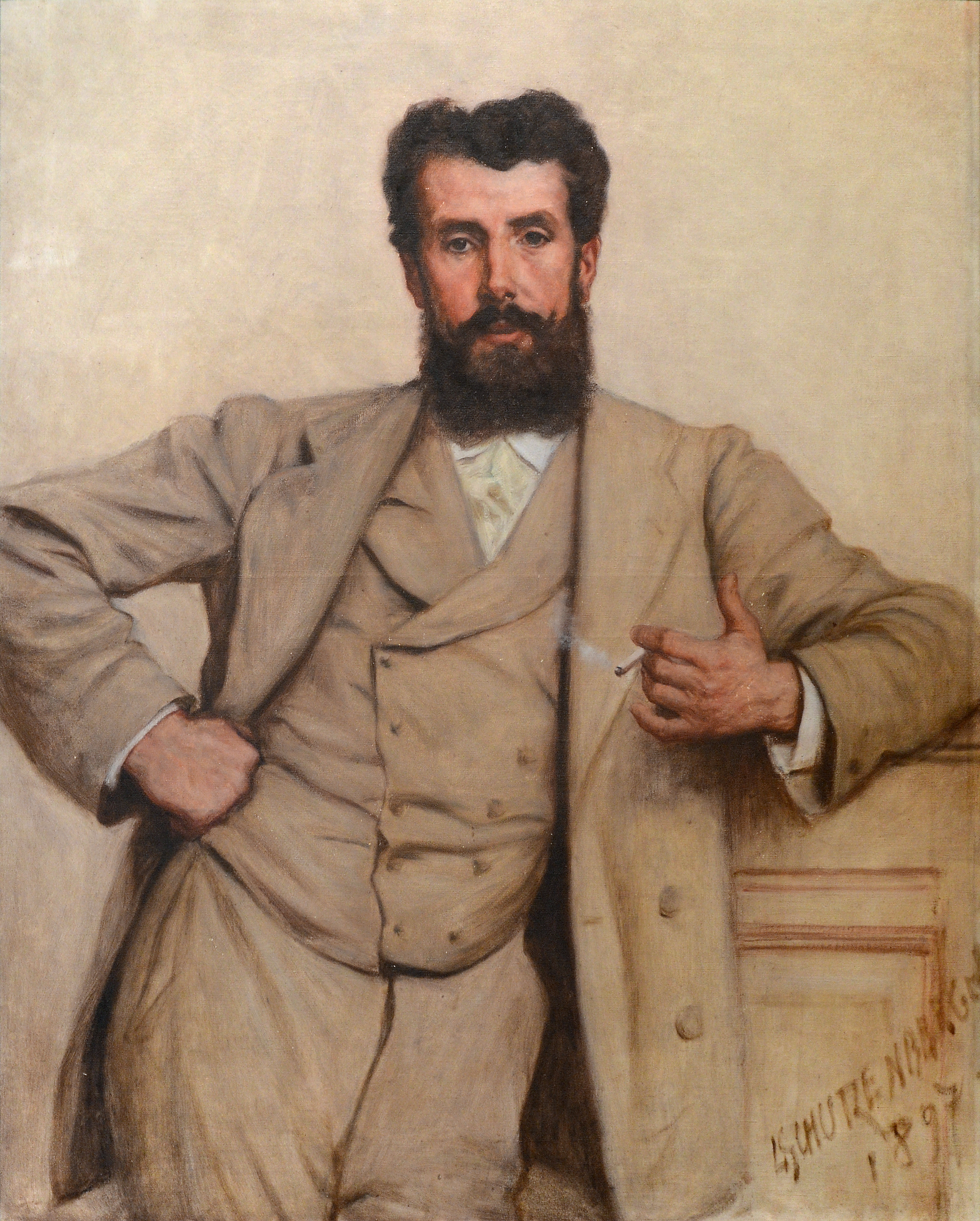
Portrait of a Man (1897), Musée des Beaux-Arts de Strasbourg.

Schützenberger was born in an Alsatian family of famous brewers in Strasbourg. He was a student of Paul Delaroche and Marc-Charles-Gabriel Gleyre at École nationale supérieure des Beaux-Arts. Chevalier French Legion of Honor since 1870.

In a period between 1870 and 1885 he was the owner of the Scharrachbergheim-Irmstett castle, where he had made his studio on the first floor.

The artist René Schützenberger was his first cousin once removed.

== Works ==
- Chasseur sonnant du cor ou L'Hallali, 1859, Museum of Fine Arts of Strasbourg
- Portrait d'homme, Museum of Fine Arts of Strasbourg
- Terpsichore, c. 1861, Paris, Musée d'Orsay
- Centaures chassant le sanglier, 1864, Paris, Musée d'Orsay
- L'Enlèvement d'europe, 1865, huile sur toile, 146x223, Musée des beaux-arts d'Arras
- Portrait de Mélanie Schützenberger, tante de l'artiste, 1865, Museum of Fine Arts of Strasbourg
- Portrait de Th. Berger, Museum of Fine Arts of Strasbourg
- Entrevue de César et d'Arioviste en Alsace, Musée des beaux-arts de Mulhouse
- Le Soir, Musée des beaux arts de Mulhouse
- L'Exode (famille alsacienne quittant son pays), 1872, Musée des beaux arts de Mulhouse
- Portrait de Mme Parot, 1875, Museum of Fine Arts of Strasbourg
- Portrait de Louis Schützenberger Père, brasseur à Schiltigheim, 1876, Musée historique de Strasbourg
- Portrait de Mme Weber-Schlumberger, 1881, Museum of Fine Arts of Strasbourg
- Portrait du baron Maximilien Frédéric Albert De Dietrich, 1882, private collection
- Scène d'inquisition, 1889, private collection
- Portrait d'homme, 1897, Museum of Fine Arts of Strasbourg
- Portrait de femme, 1900, private collection
- Portrait du gouverneur Louis-Gustave Binger, 1900, Musée d'art et d'histoire Louis Senlecq
- Portrait de femme, Museum of Fine Arts of Strasbourg
- Souvenir d'Italie - Fuite en Égypte, Musée des beaux arts de Mulhouse
- Femme nue, début du xxe siècle, Strasbourg Museum of Modern and Contemporary Art
