= Salon of 1878 =

1878 art exhibition in Paris

Setting Out to Fish by John Singer Sargent

The Salon of 1878 was an art exhibition held at the Palace of Industry in Paris which opened on 25 May 1878. It was the annual Salon staged by the Académie des Beaux-Arts and featured many leading painters and sculptors of the Belle Époque. The same year a separate art exhibition was held concurrently as part of the Exposition Universelle, which featured retrospectives and submissions from other countries such as the United Kingdom.

While there was no Impressionist Exhibition held that year, Pierre-Auguste Renoir submitted The Cup of Chocolate to the official Salon. John Singer Sargent exhibited Setting Out to Fish which he had produced while staying on the coast of Brittany.

Jules Bastien-Lepage displayed his genre painting Haymaking to great success.

== Gallery ==
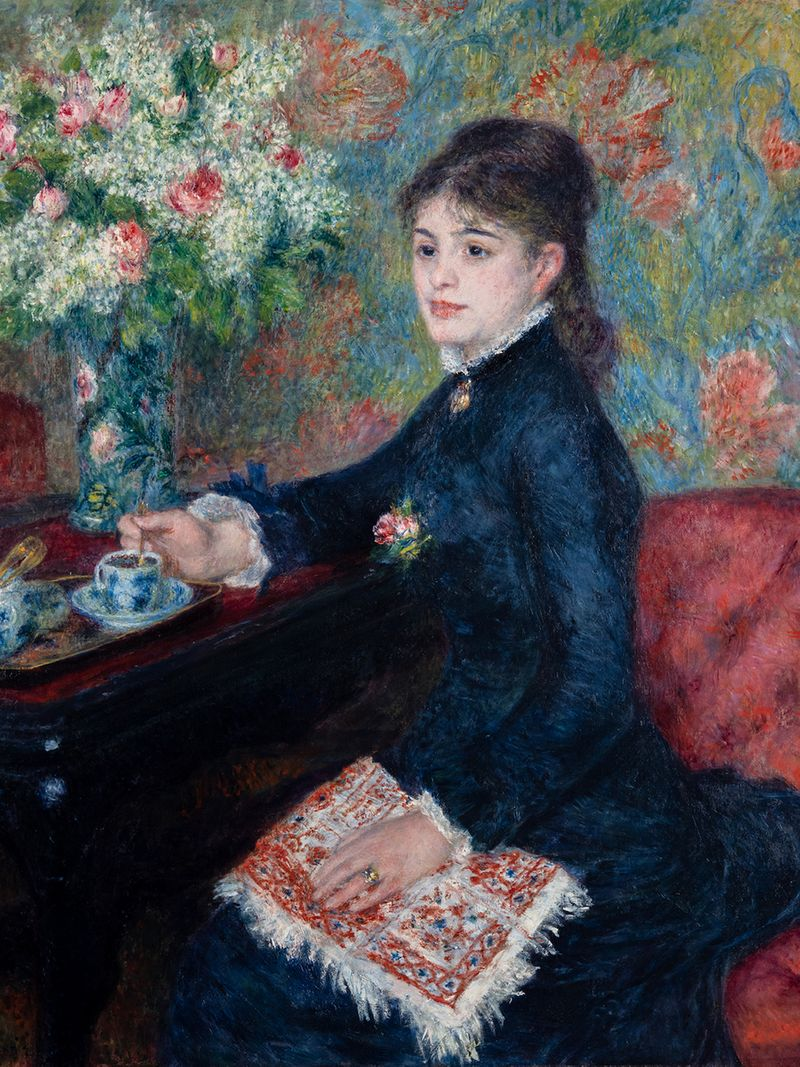
The Cup of Chocolate by Pierre-Auguste Renoir

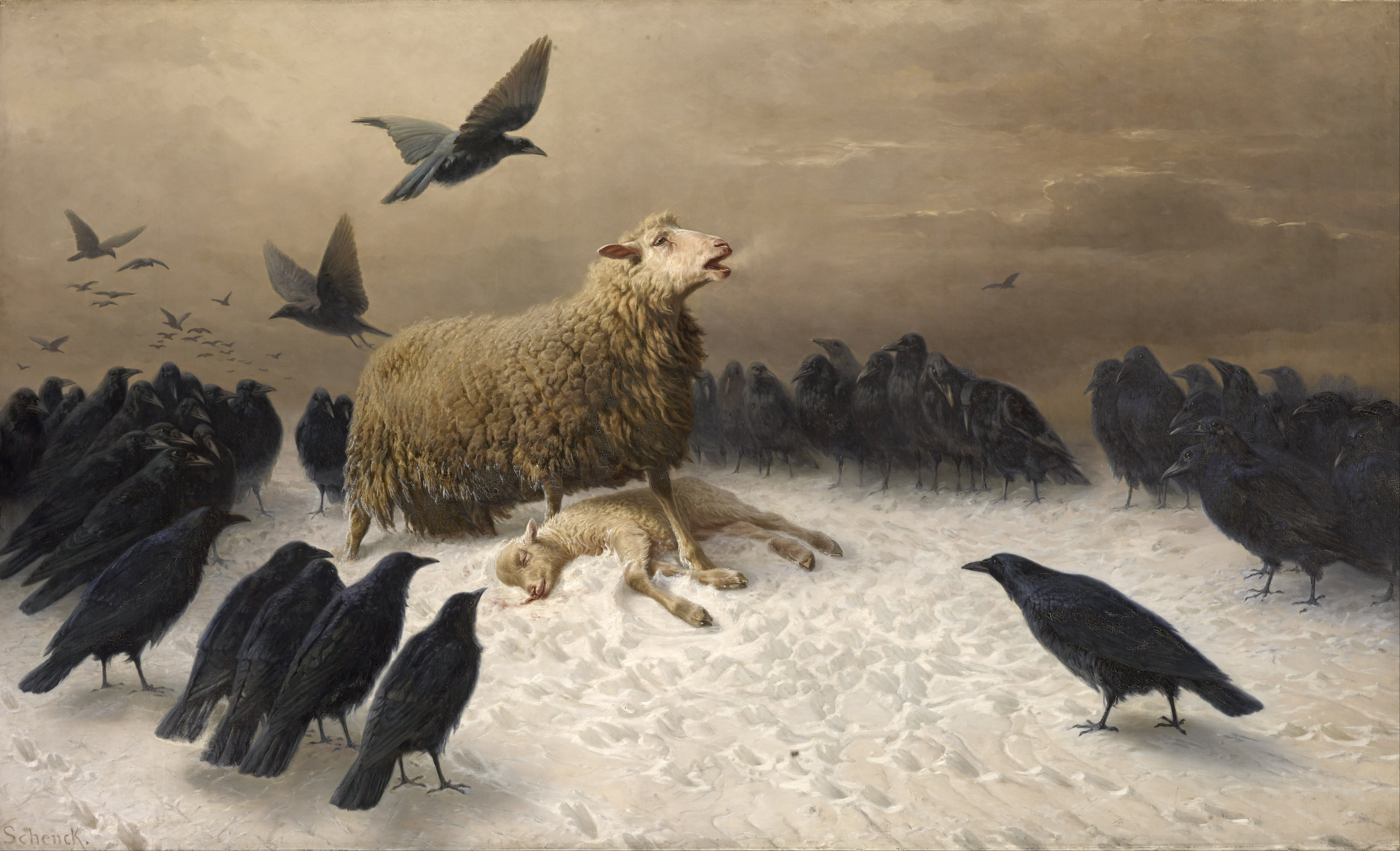
Anguish by August Friedrich Schenck

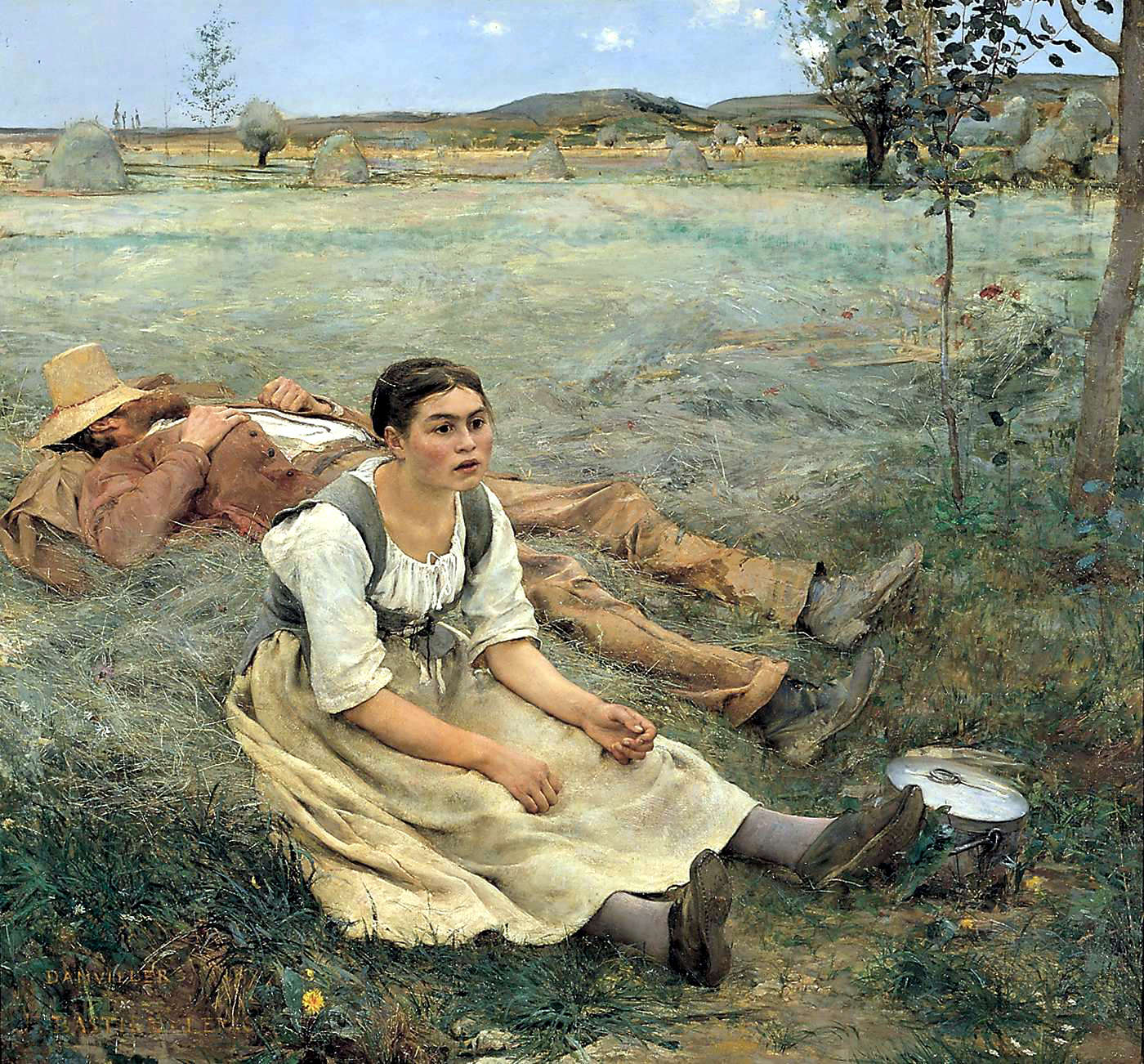
Haymaking by Jules Bastien-Lepage

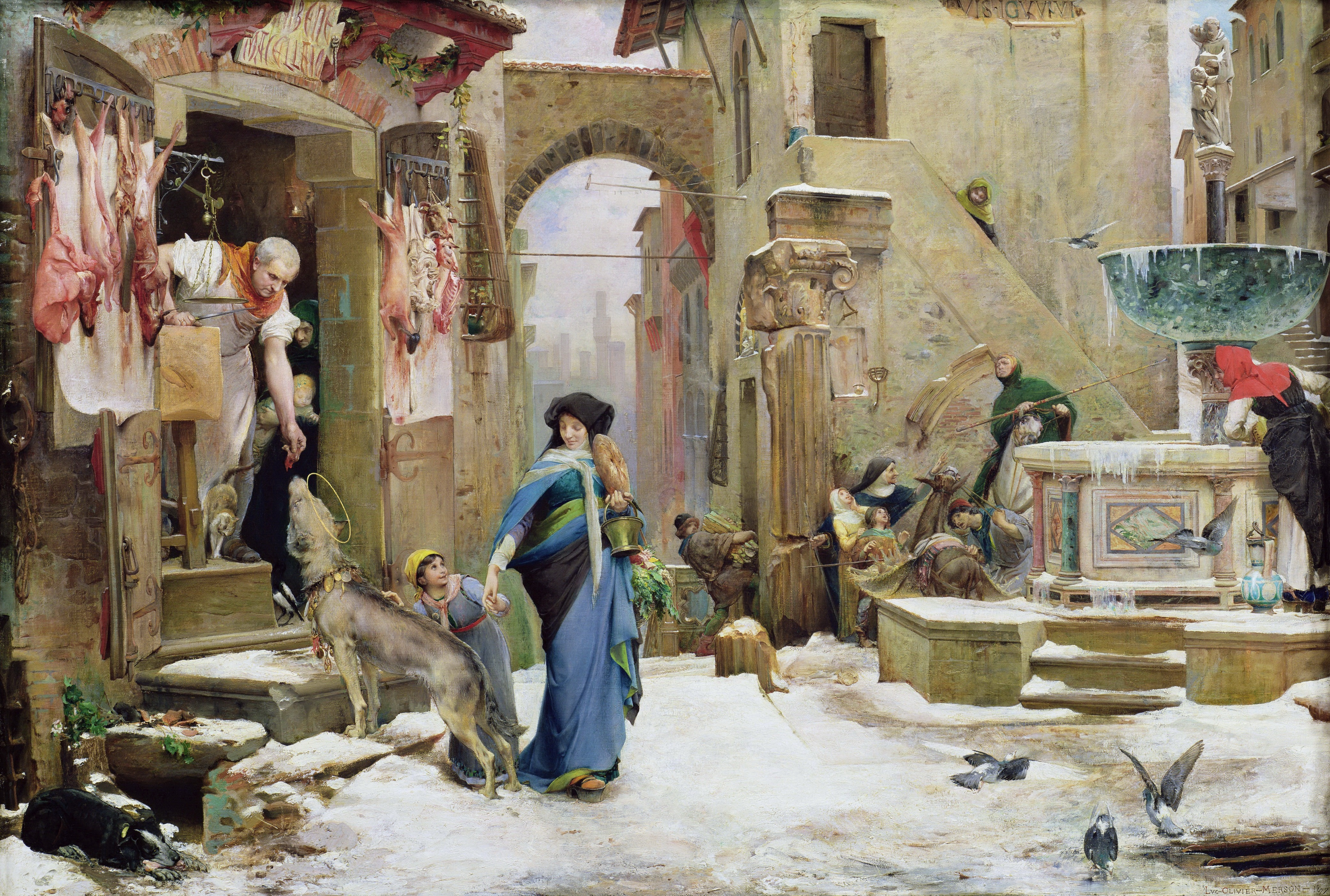
The Wolf of Gubbio by Luc-Olivier Merson

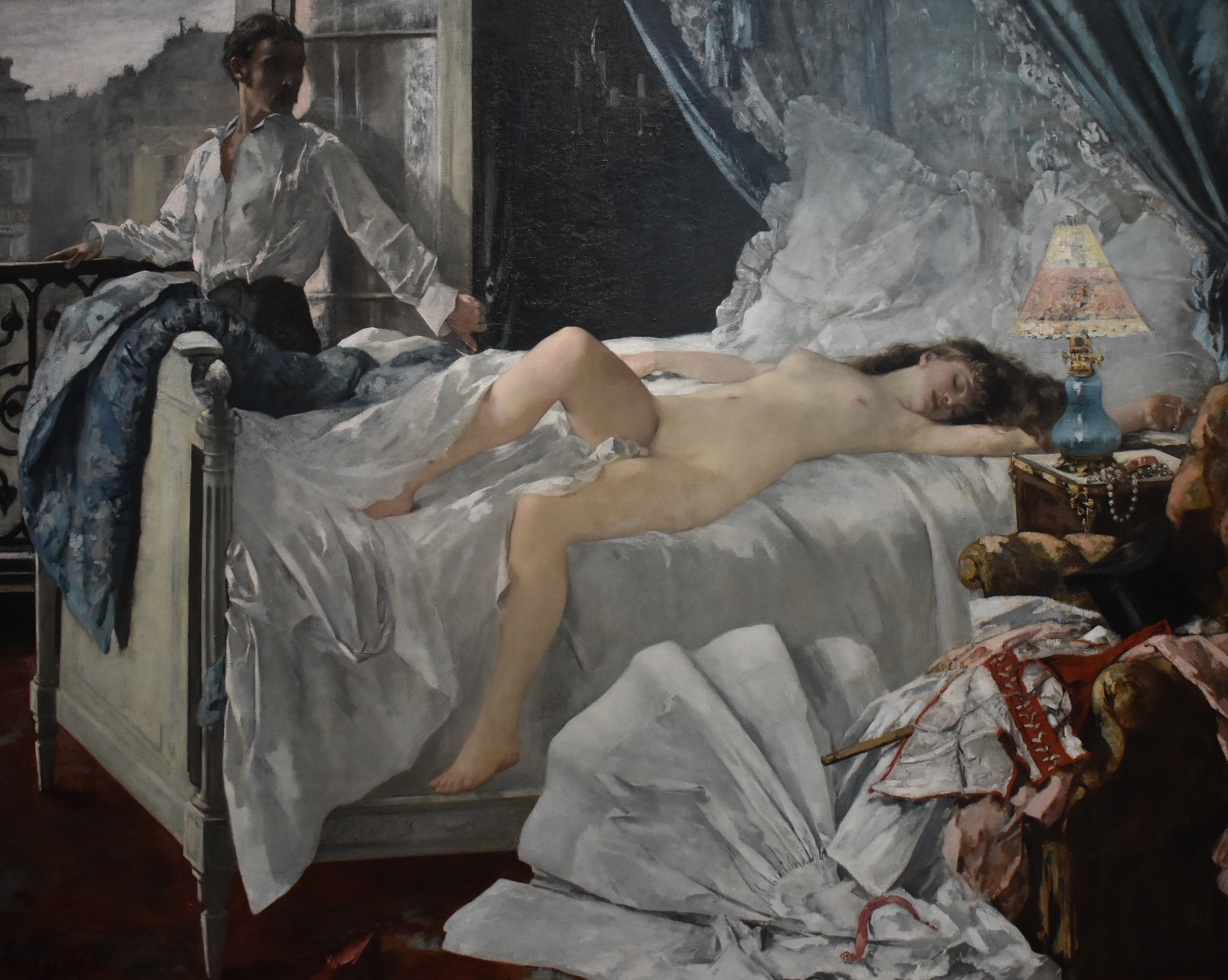
Rolla by Henri Gervex

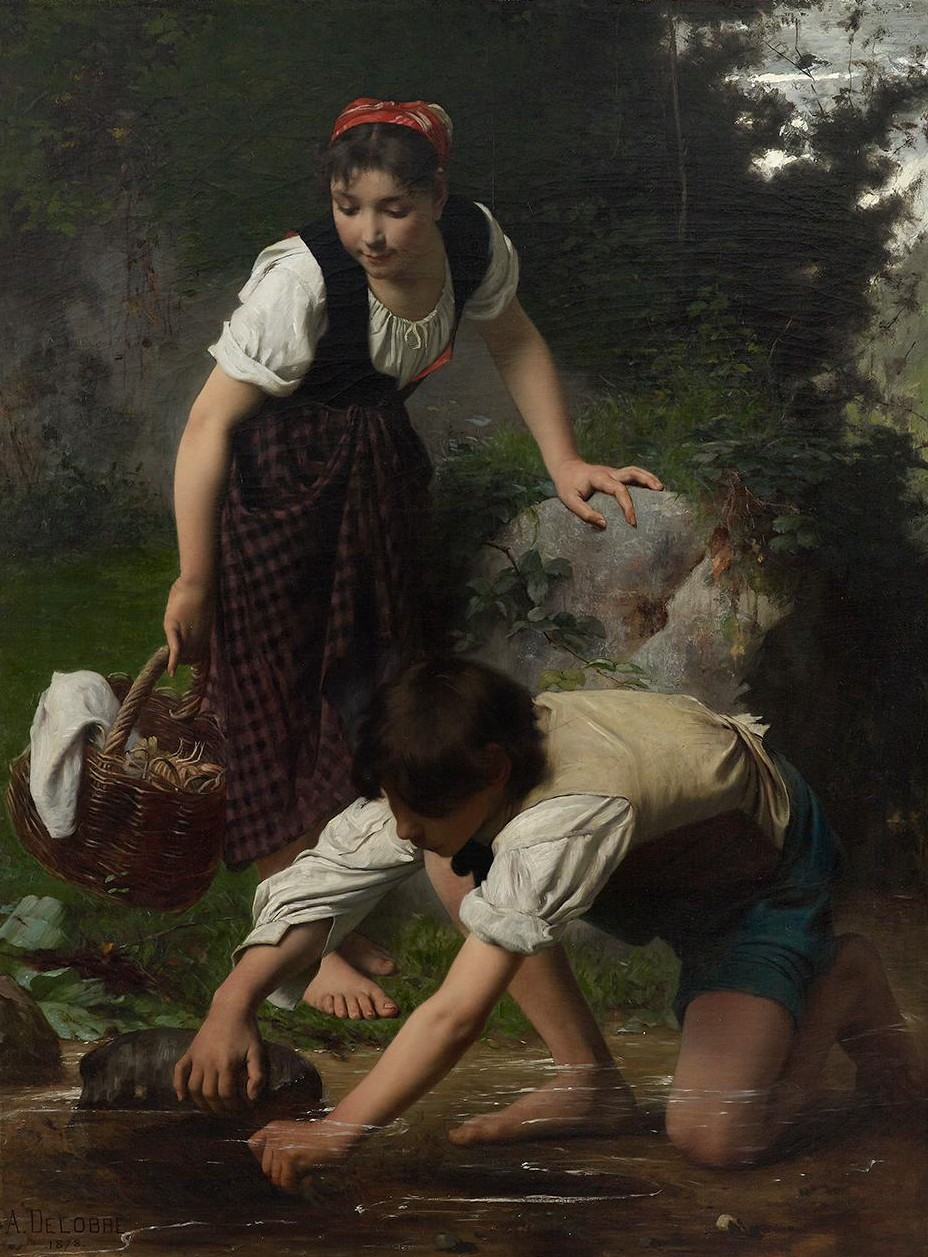
Crayfish Fishing by François-Alfred Delobbe

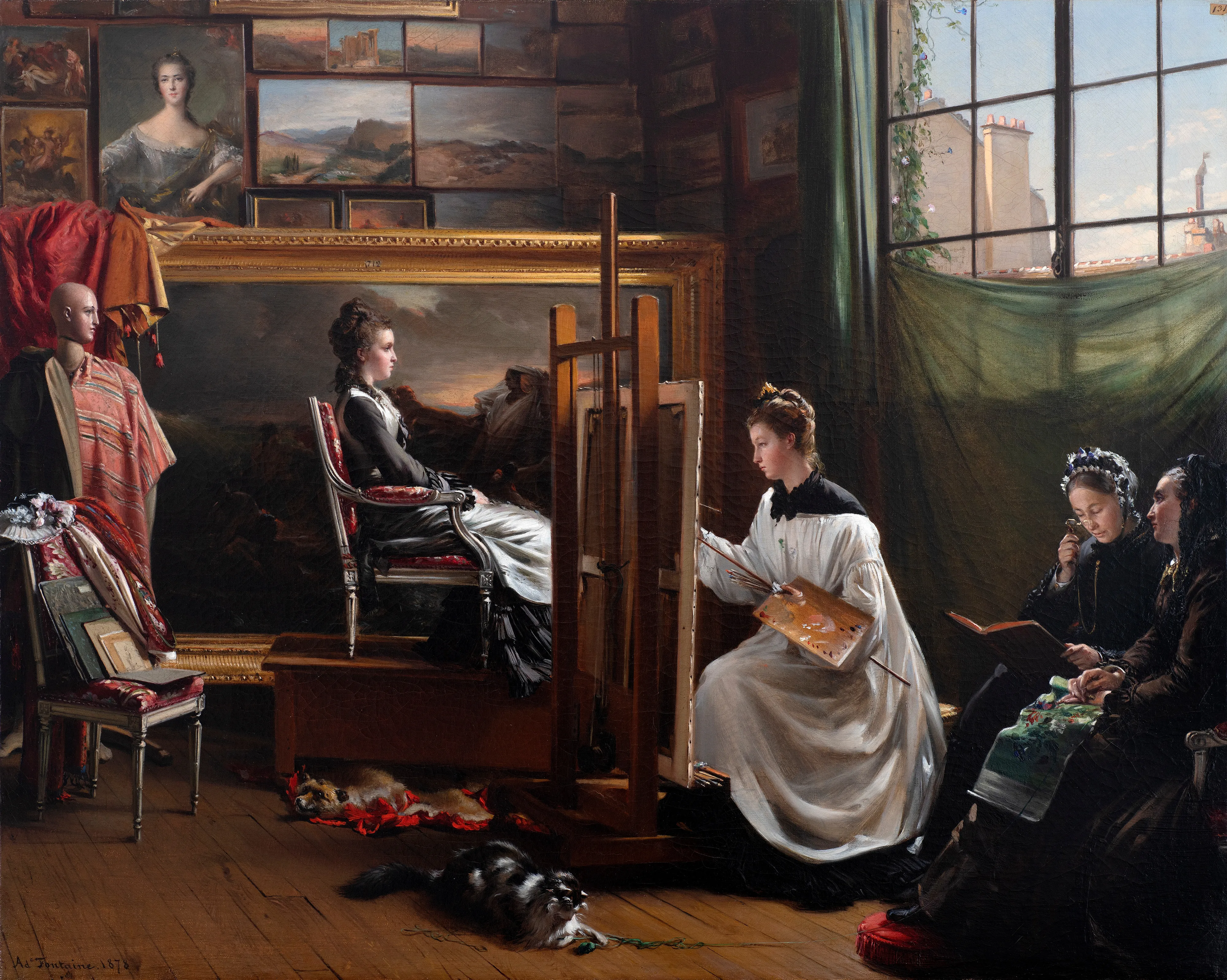
Studio Interior by Edme-Adolphe Fontaine

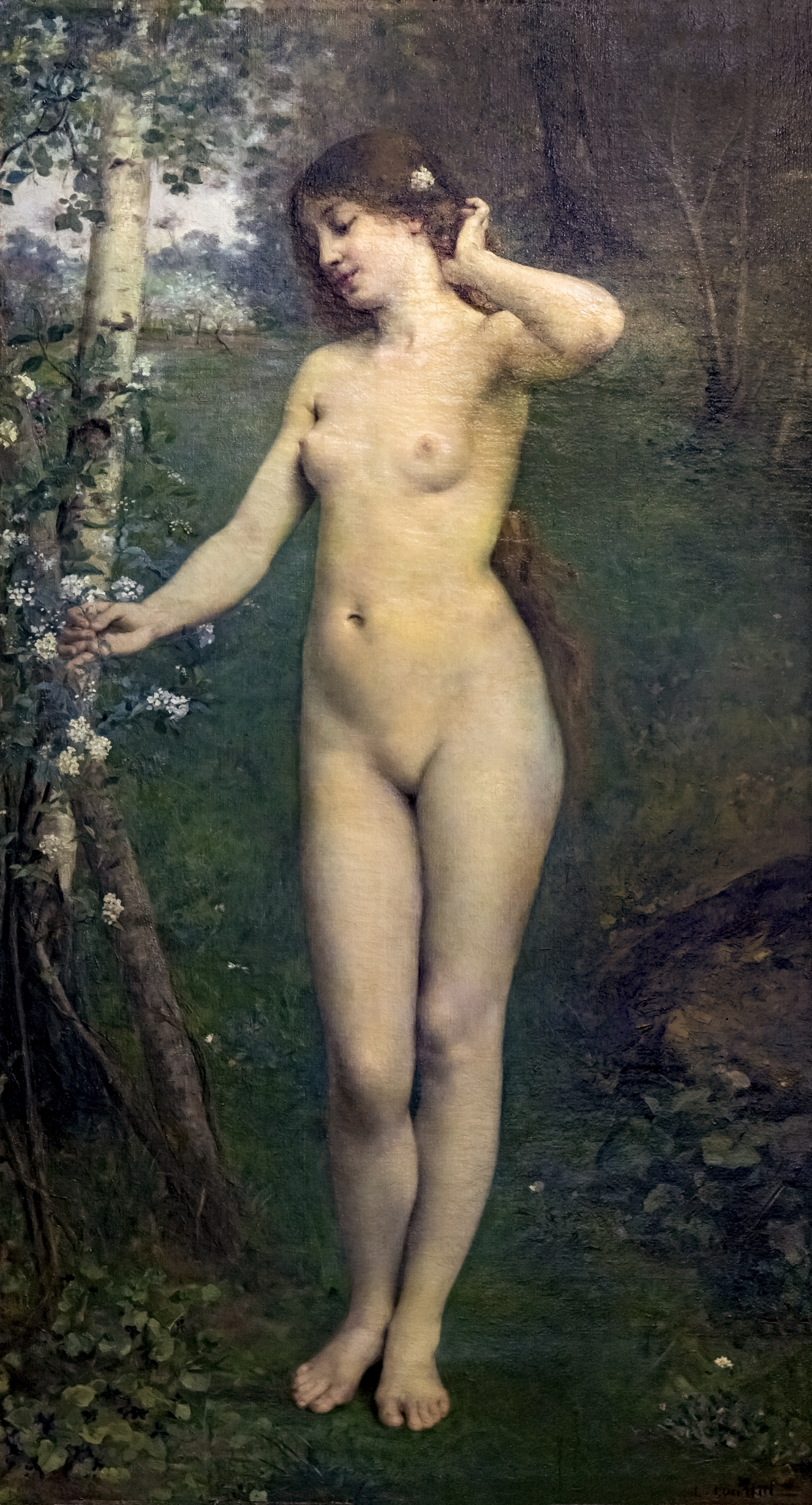
Spring by Louis-Joseph Courtat

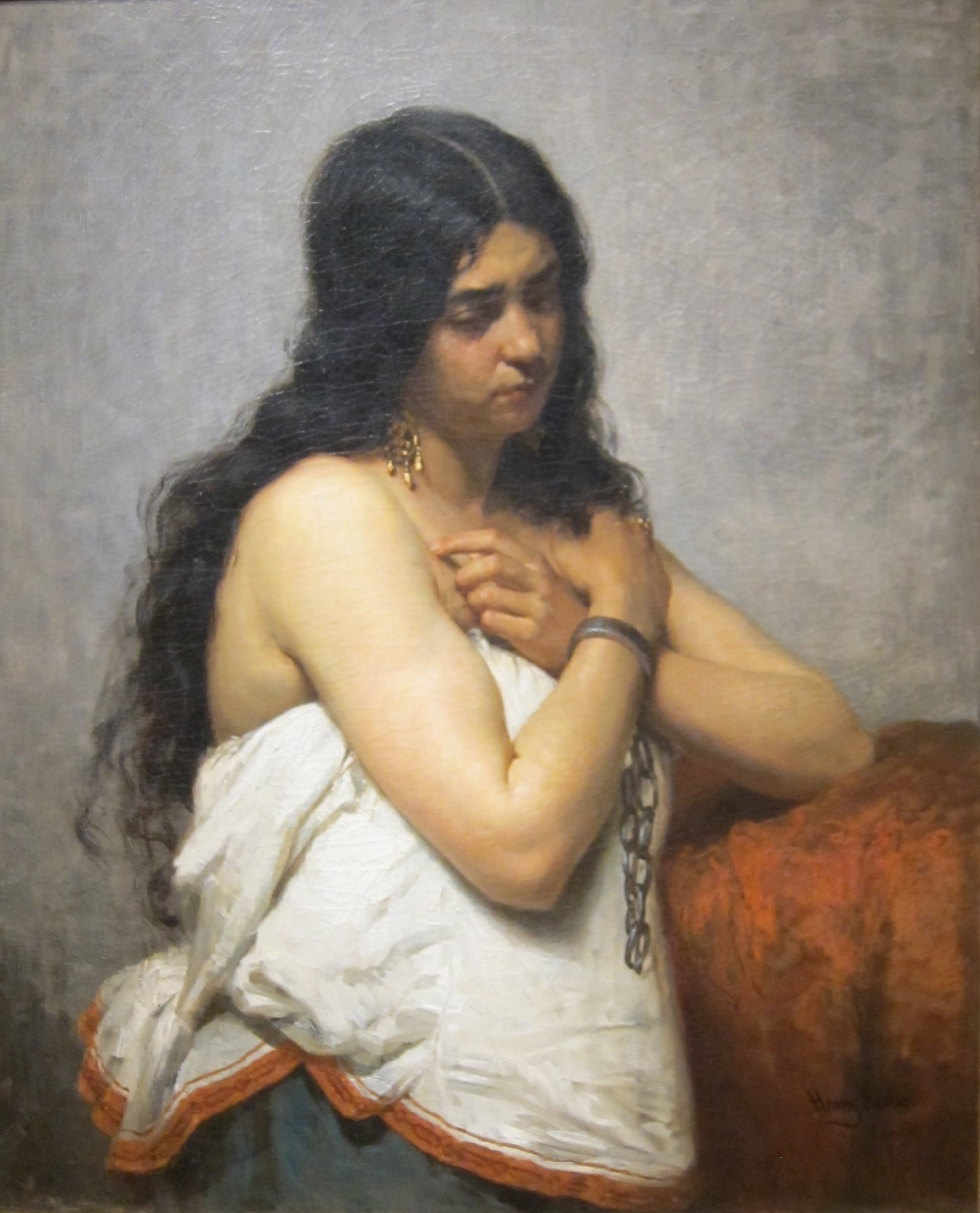
The Quadroon Girl by Henry Mosler

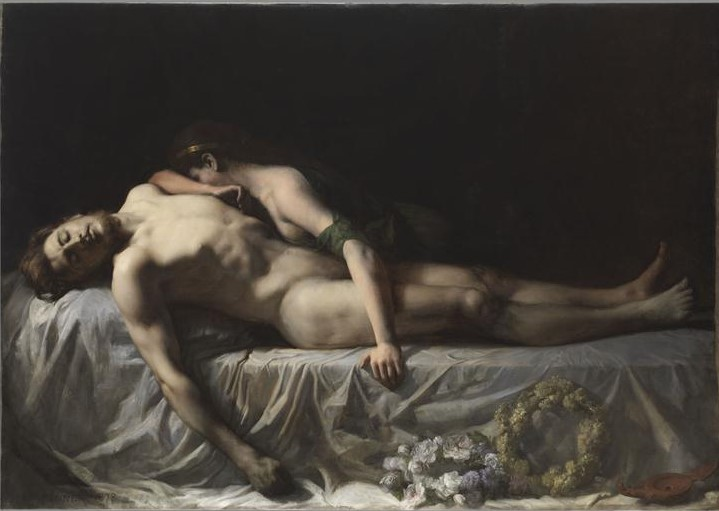
Briseis weeping over the body of Patroclus by Jean Benner

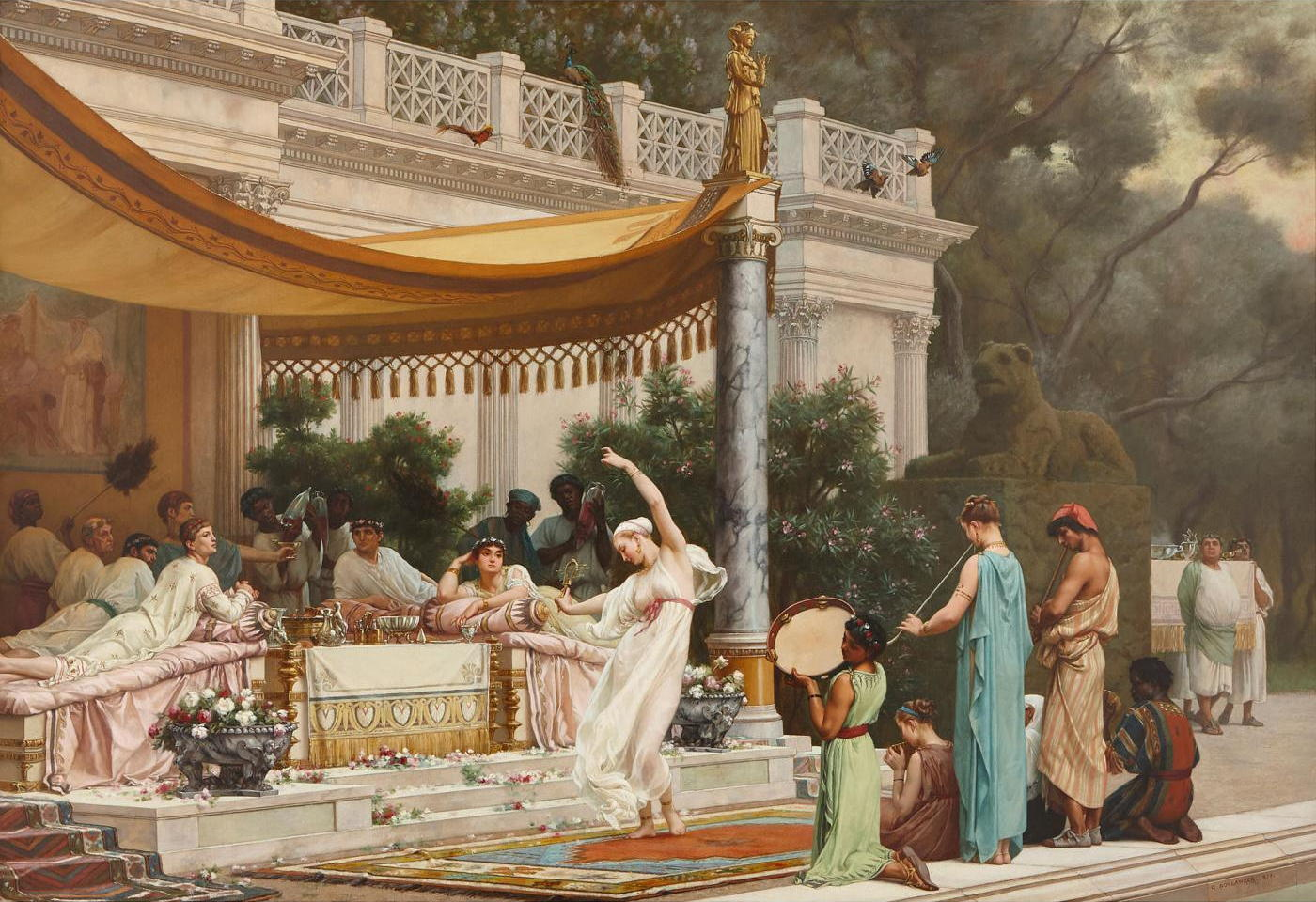
A Summer Repast at the House of Lucullus by Gustave Boulanger

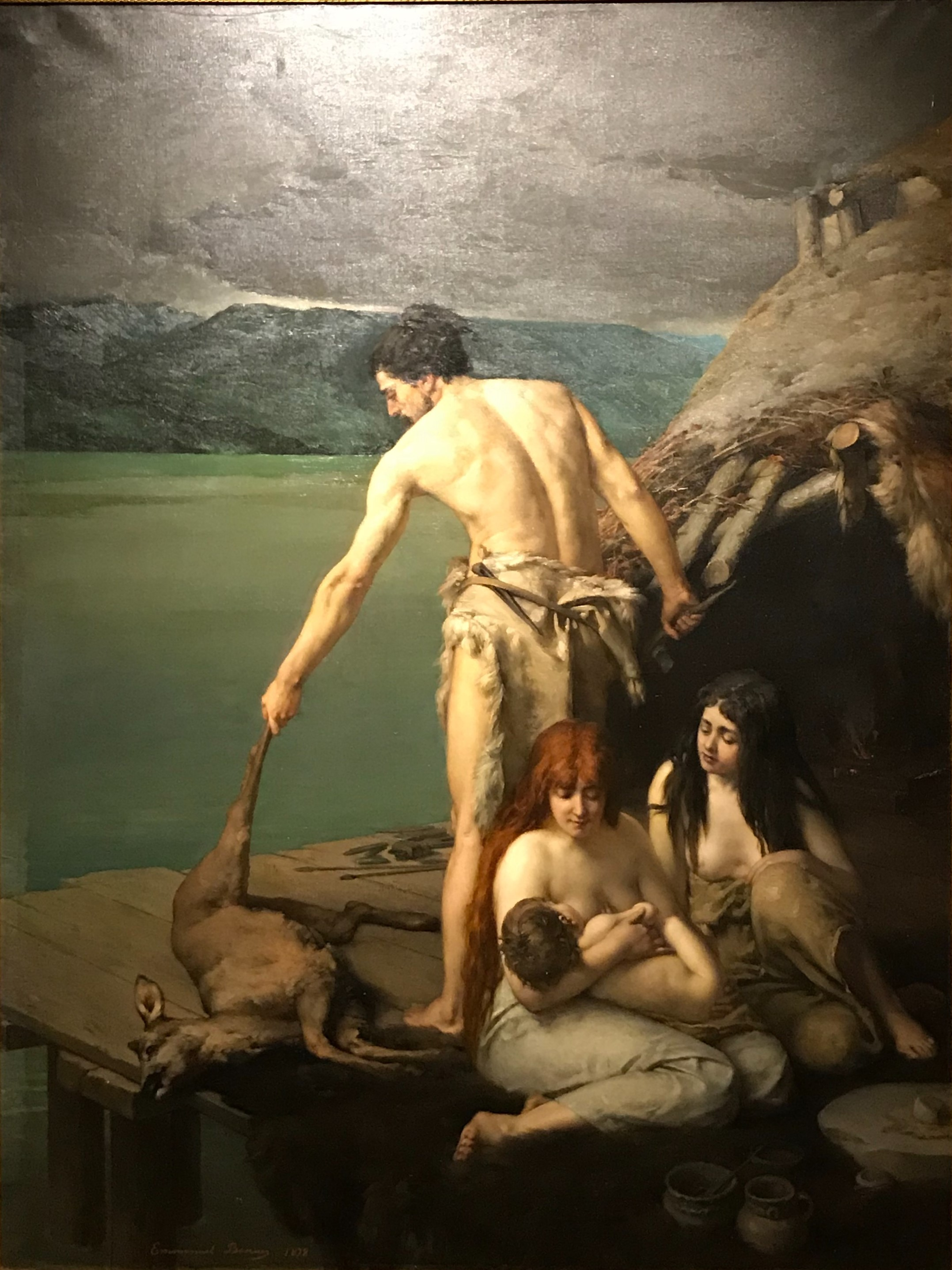
Habitation Lacustre by Emmanuel Benner

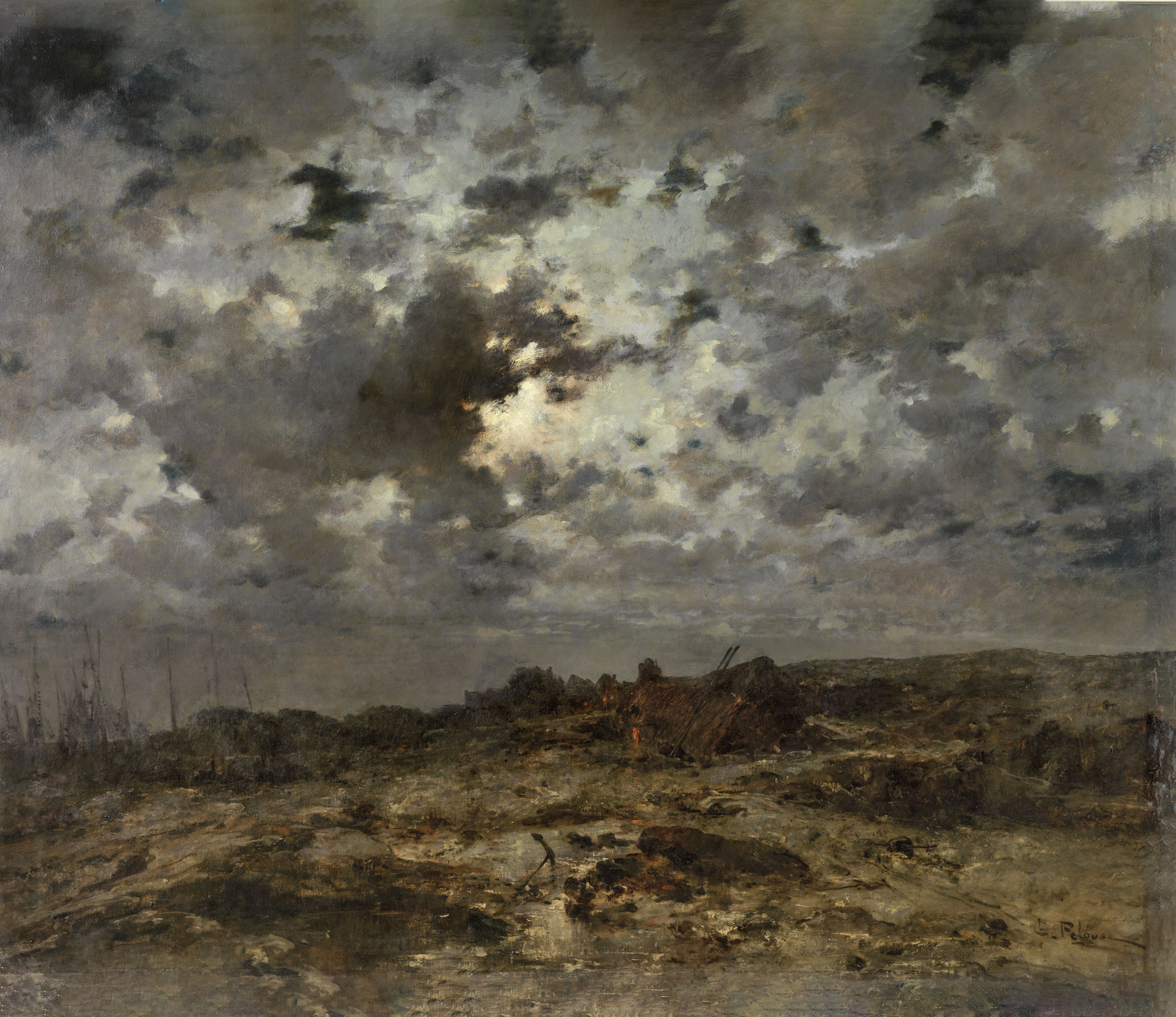
Le passage de Lanriec à Concarneau, effet de lune by Léon Germain Pelouse

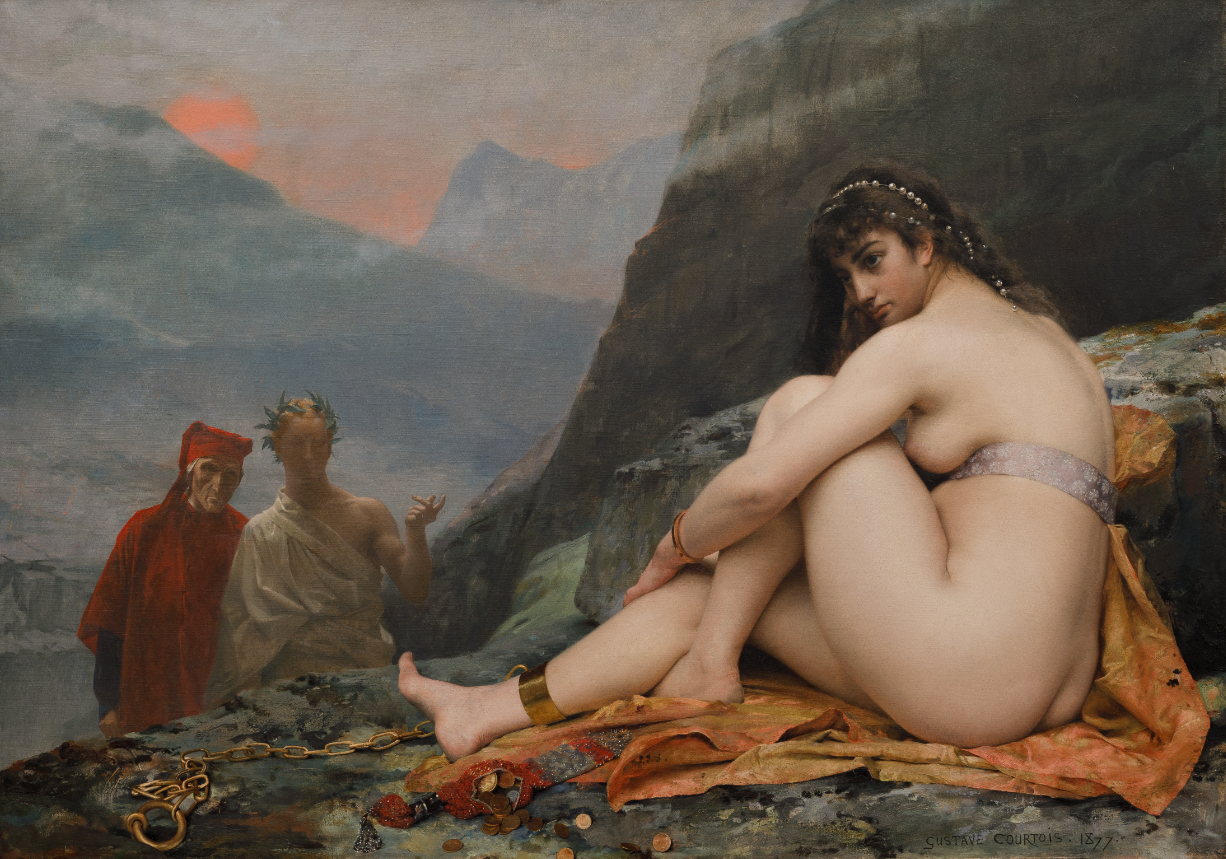
Thaïs en Enfer by Gustave-Claude-Etienne Courtois

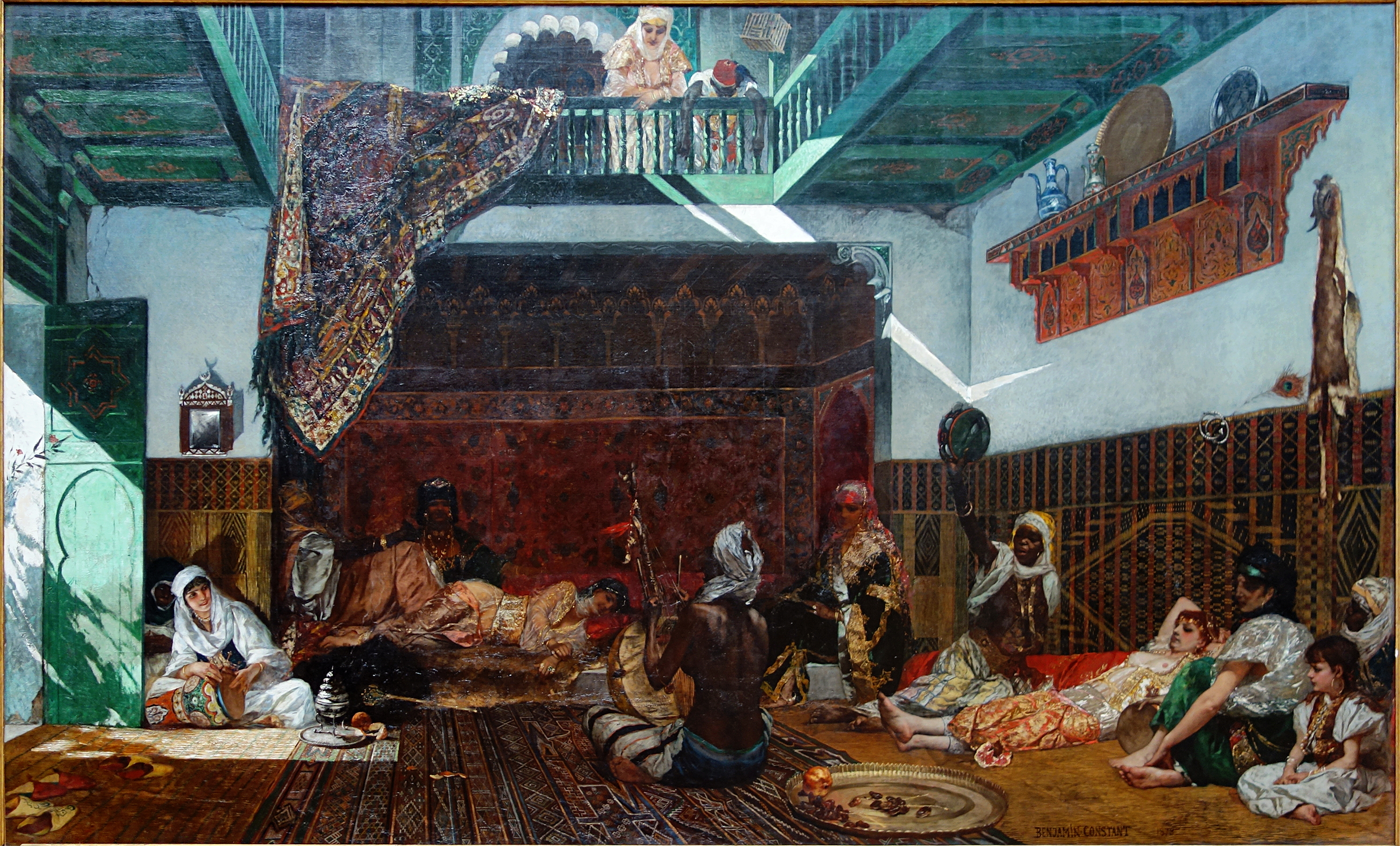
Harem in Morocco by Jean-Joseph Benjamin-Constant

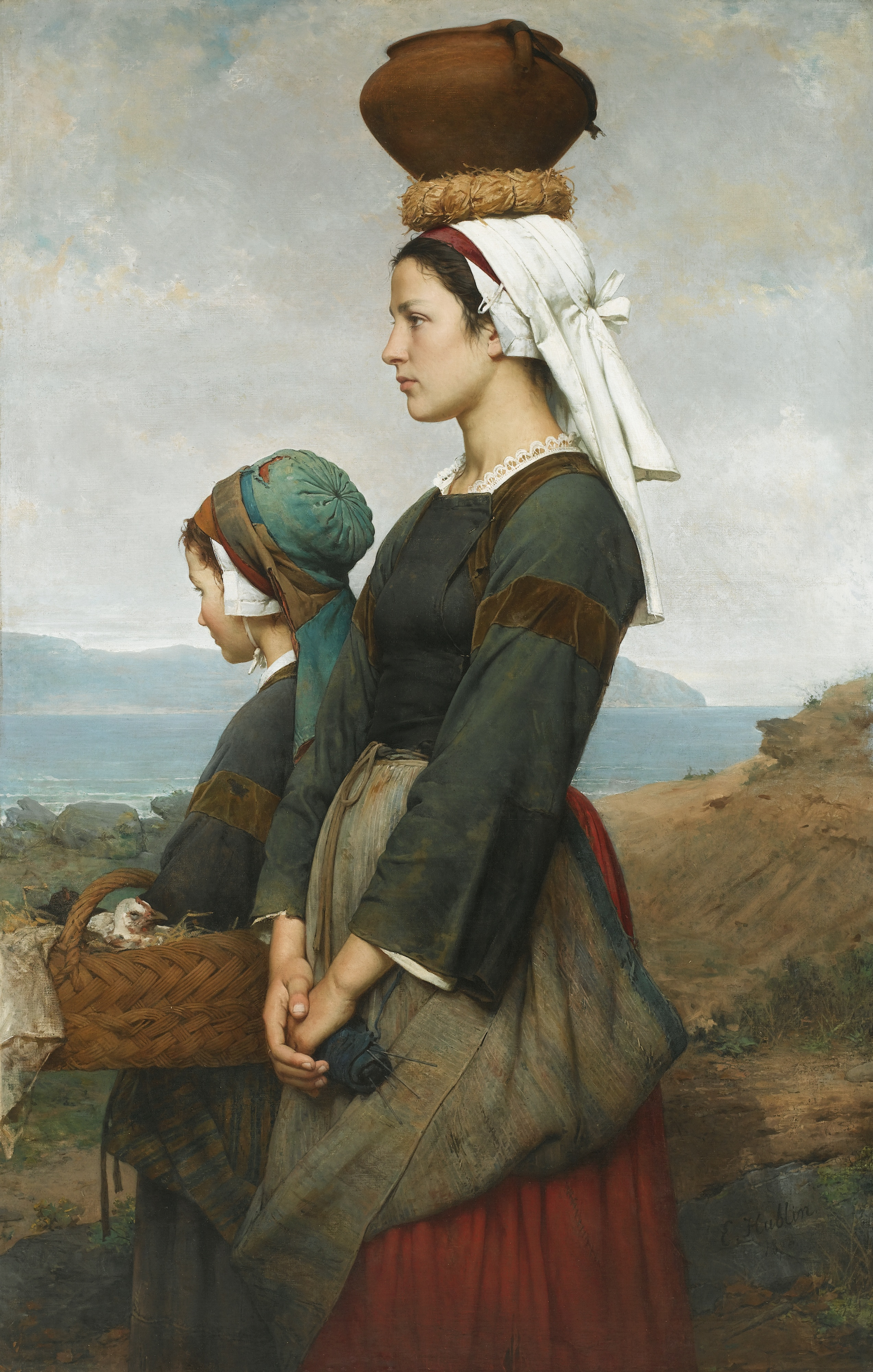
Le Chemin du Marché by Émile Auguste Hublin

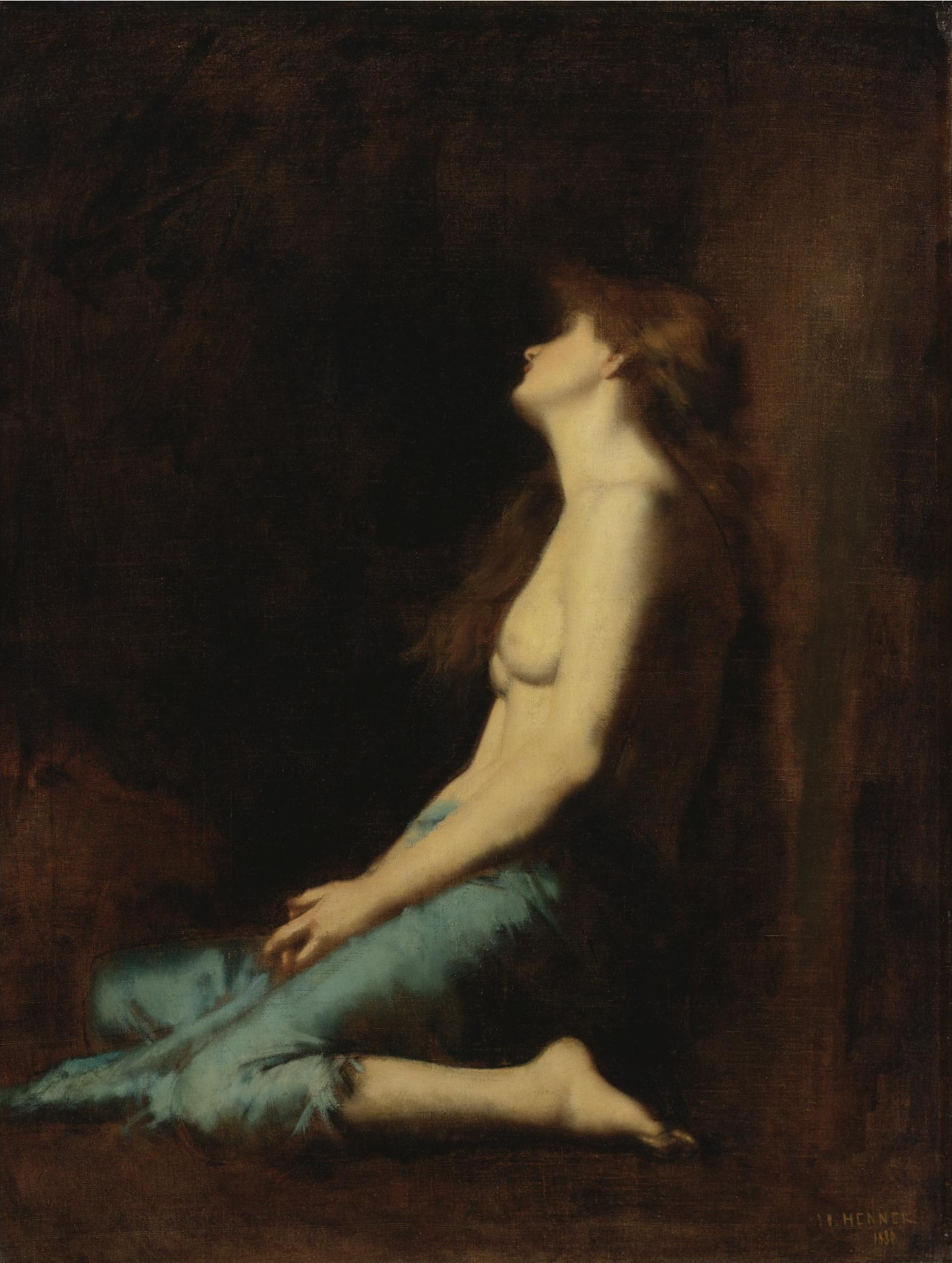
Mary Magdalene by Jean-Jacques Henner

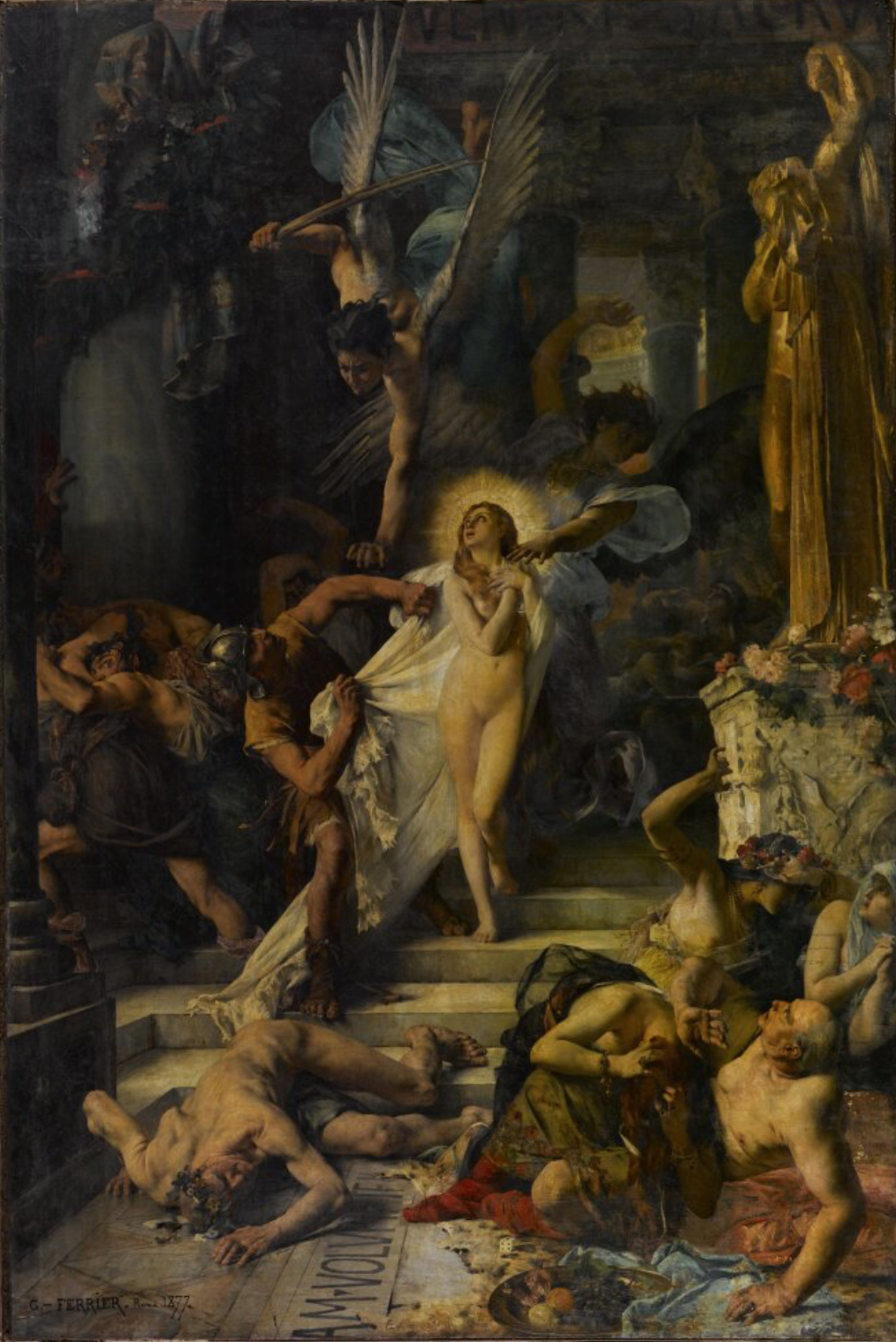
The Martyrdom of Saint Agnes by Gabriel Ferrier

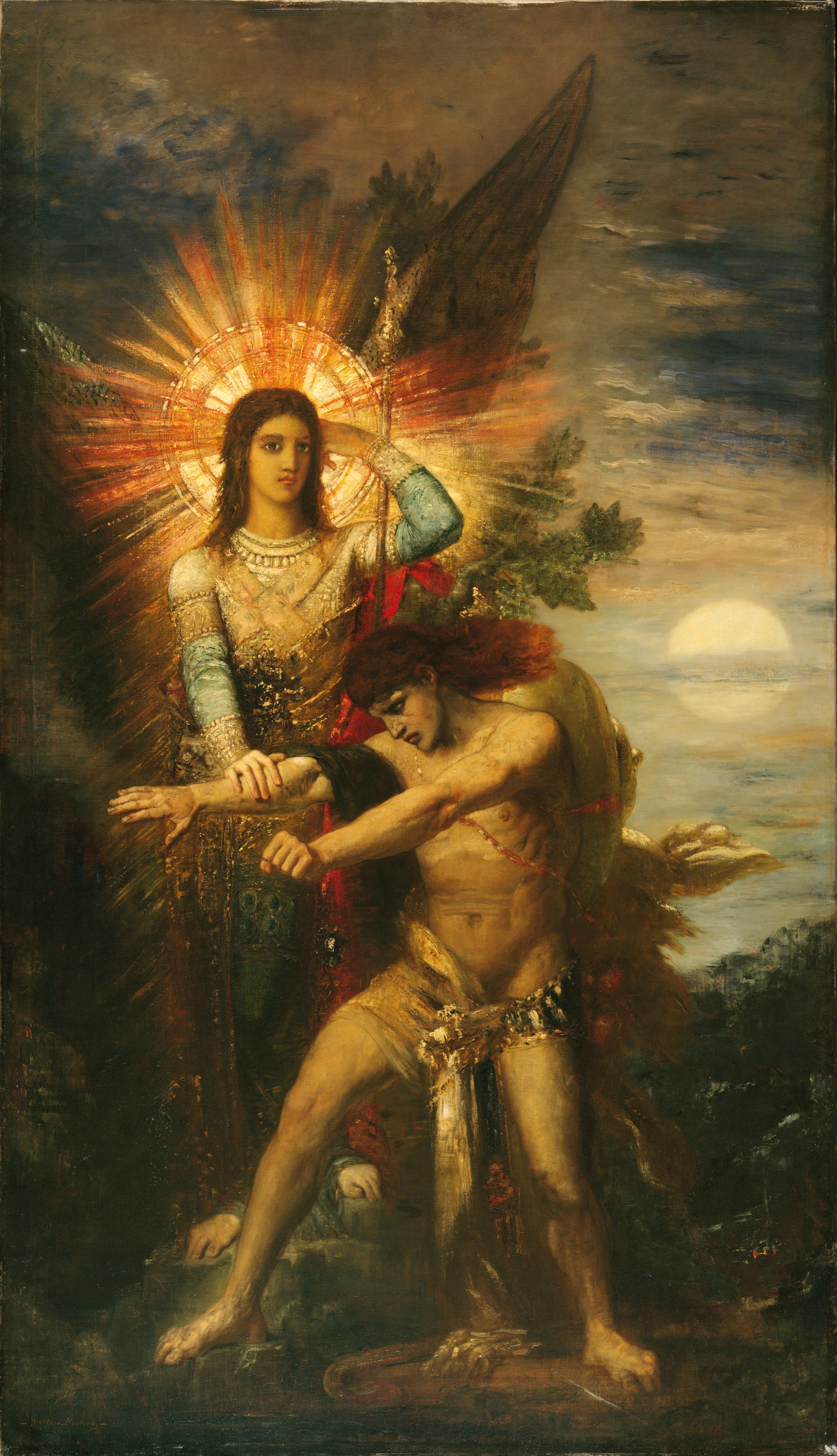
Jacob and the Angel by Gustave Moreau

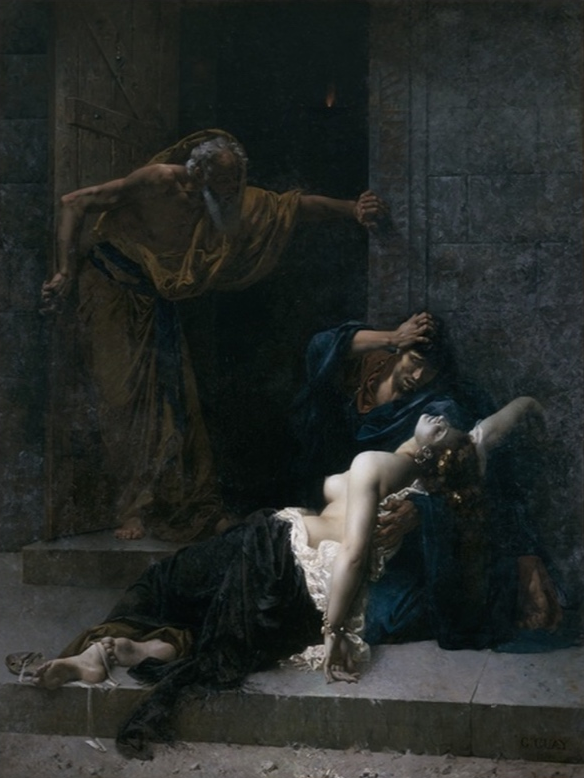
Le Lévite d'Ephraïm by Gabriel Guay

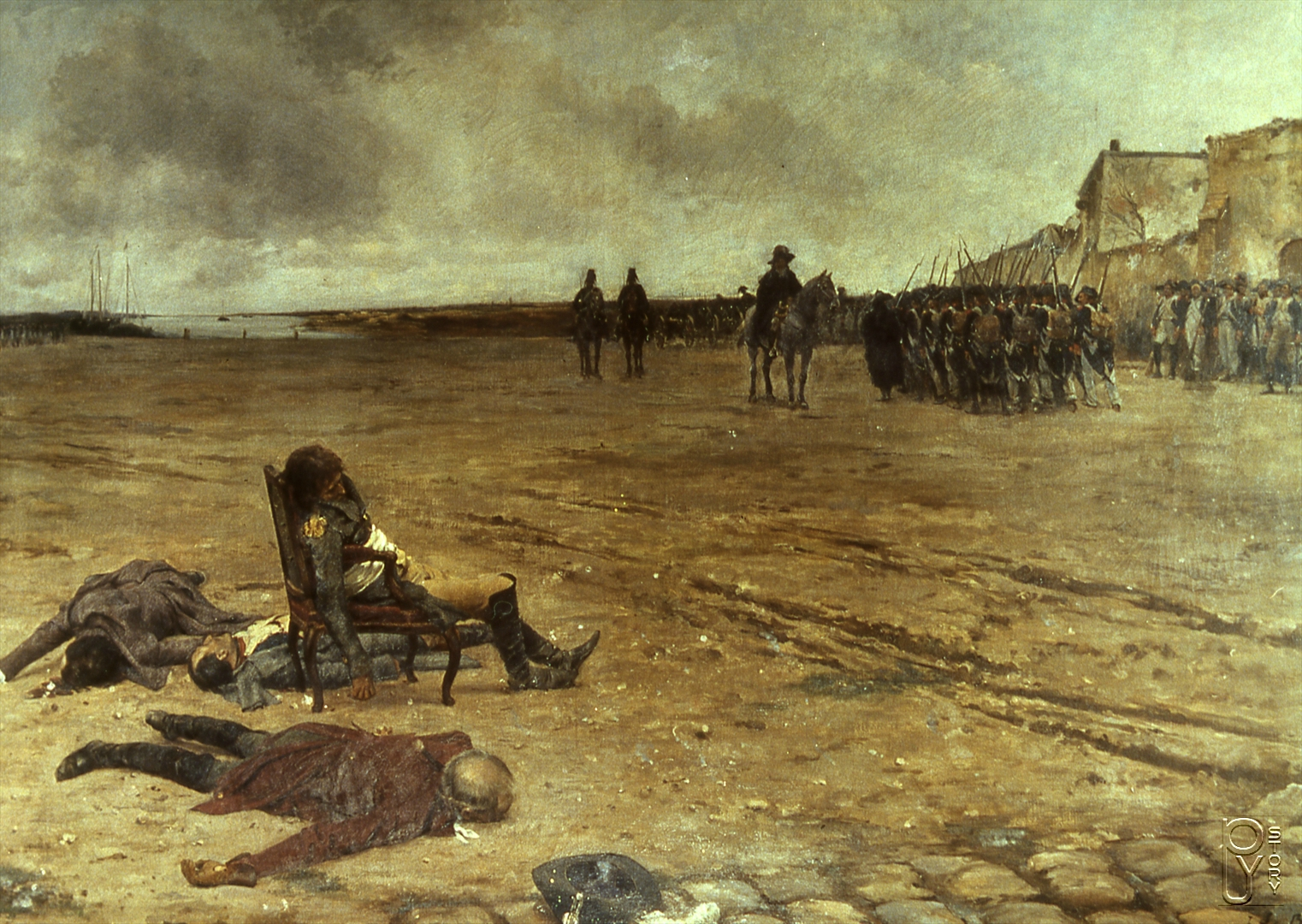
The Death of General d'Elbée by Julien Le Blant

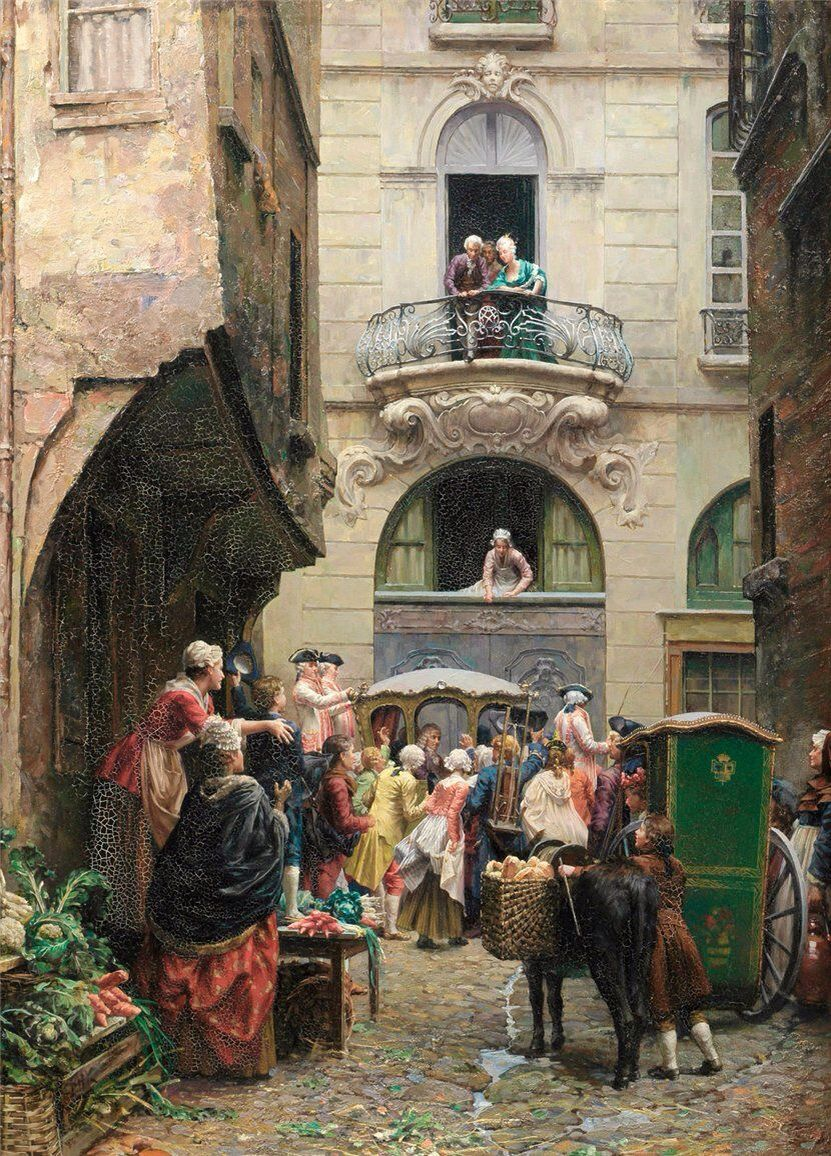
Voltaire's Last Trip to Paris by Maurice Leloir

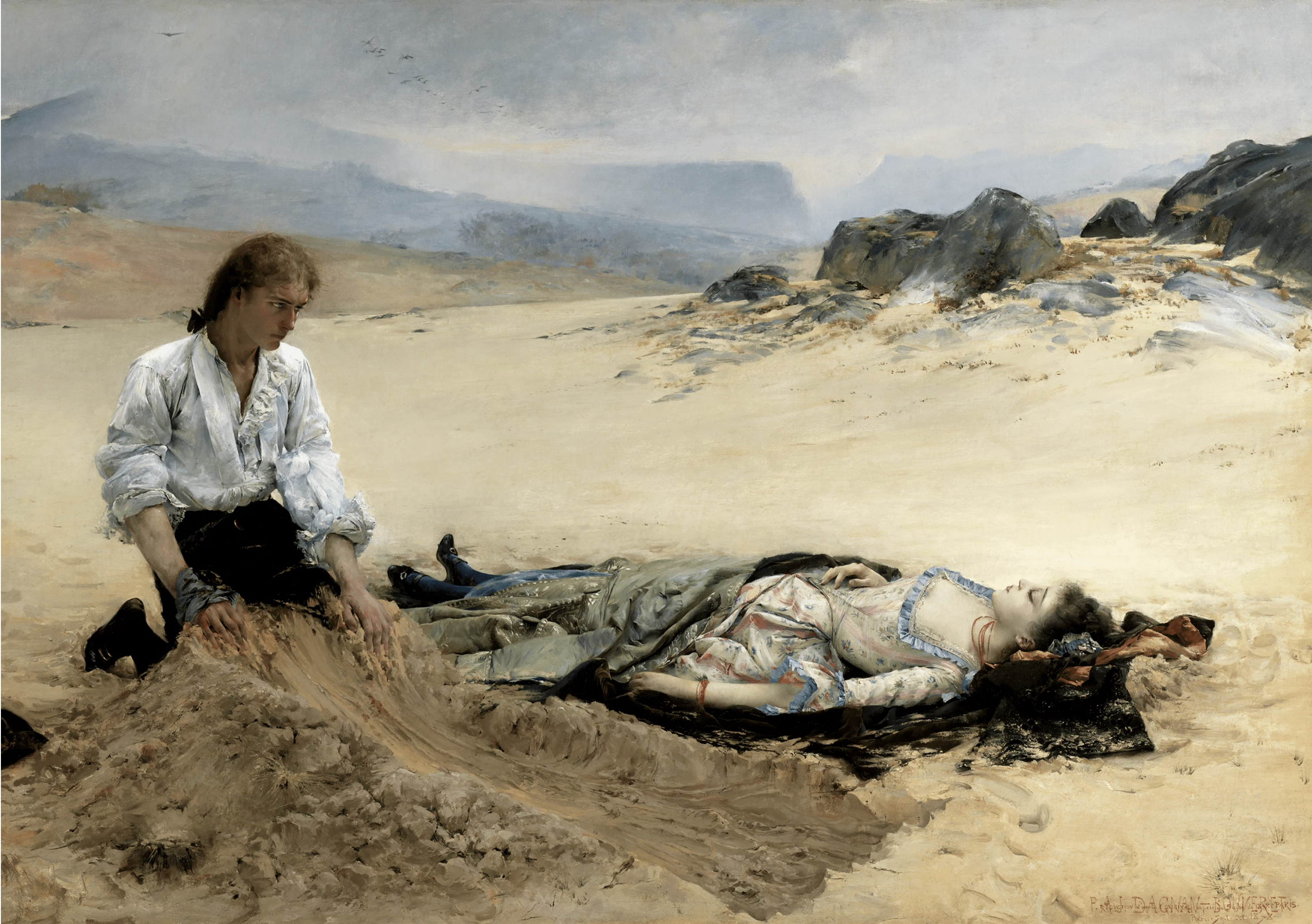
The Burial of Manon Lescaut by Pascal Dagnan-Bouveret

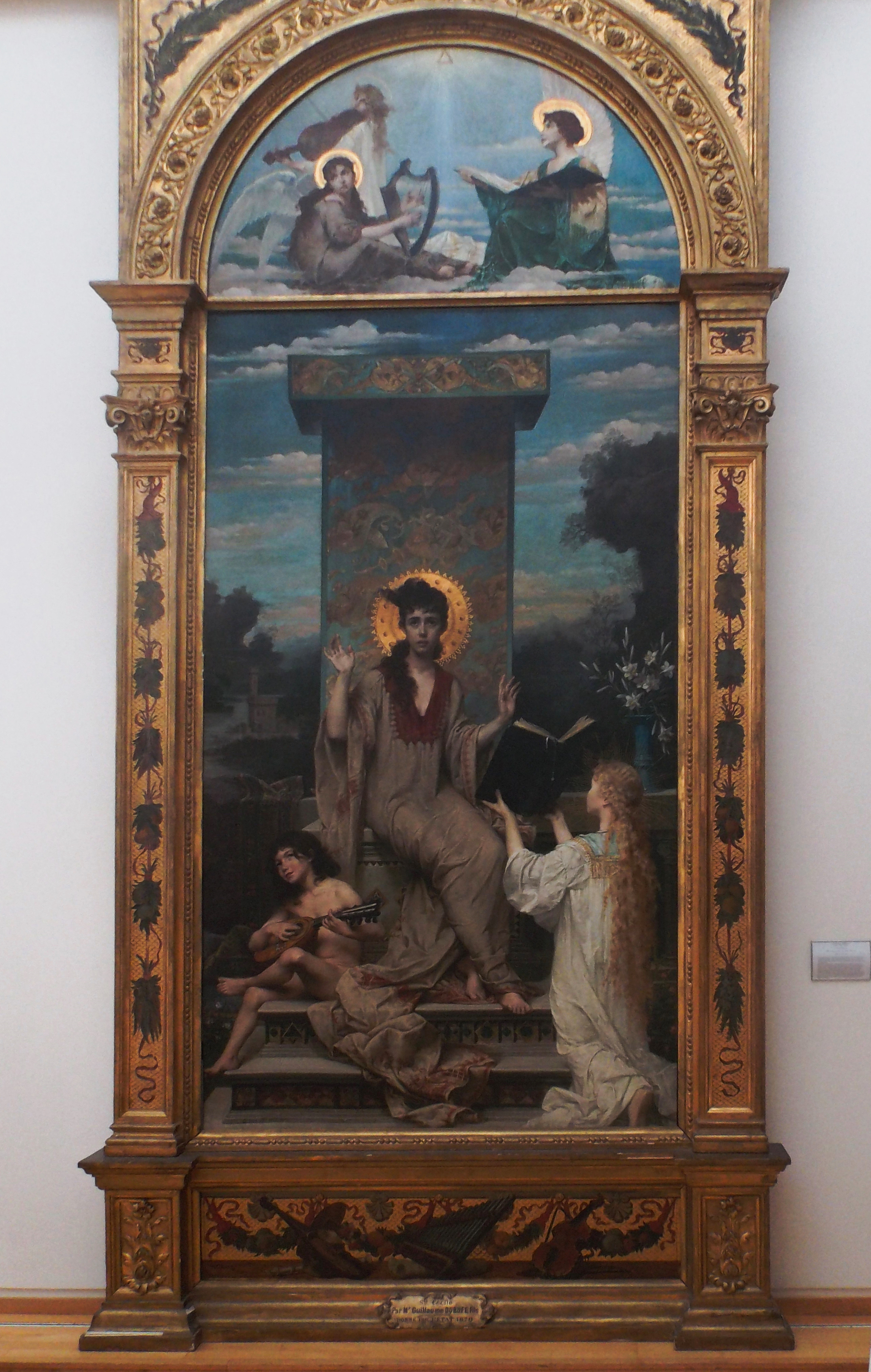
Sainte-Cécile by Guillaume Dubufe

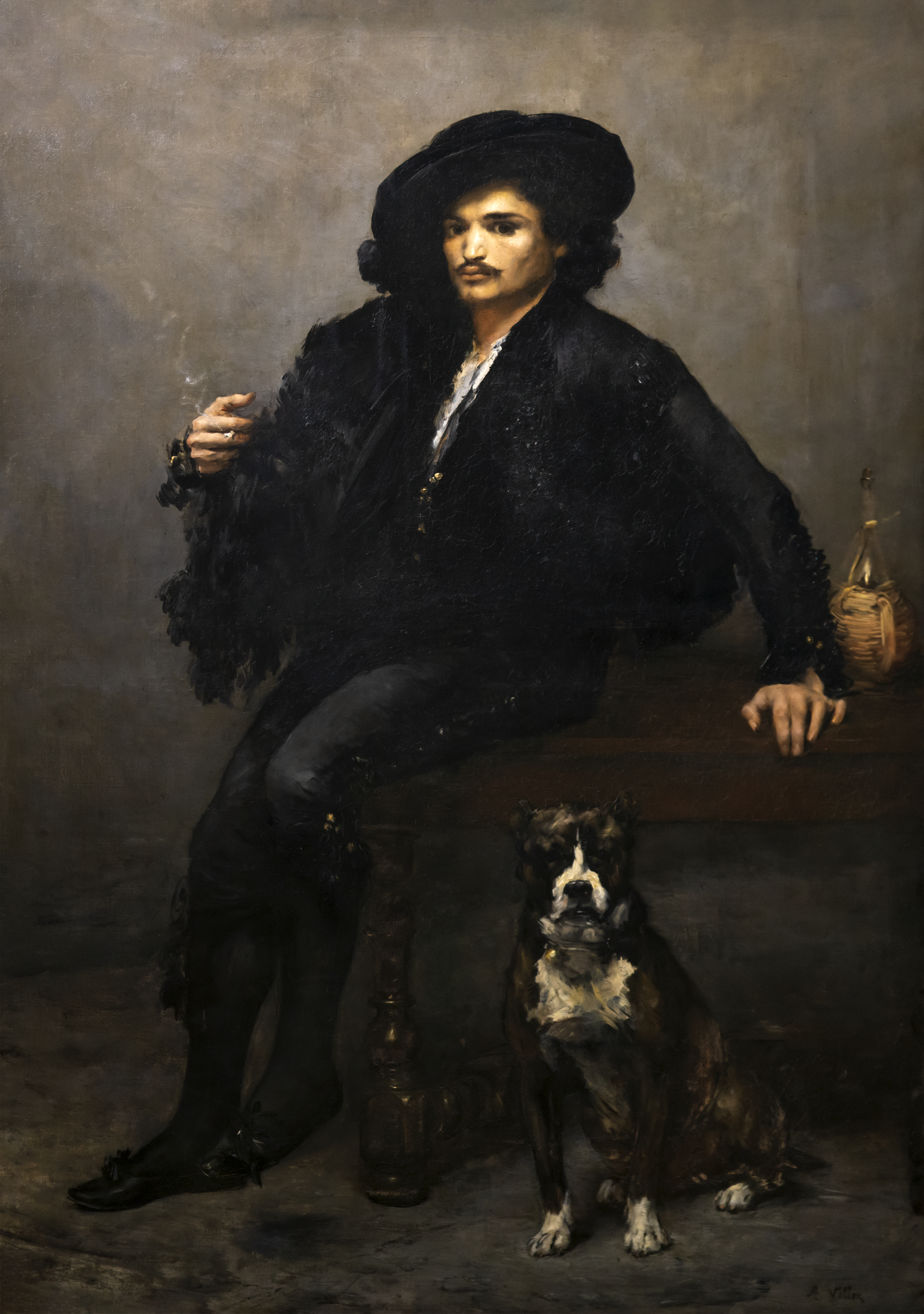
Espagnol by Antoine Vollon

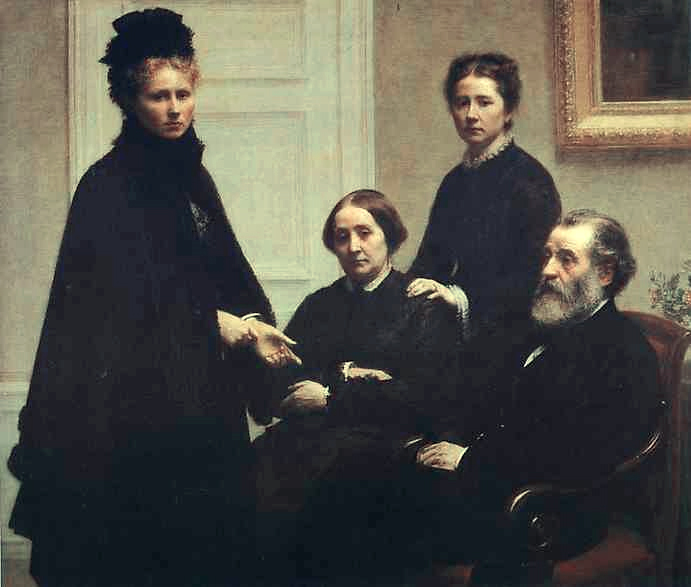
The Dubourg Family by Fantin-Latour

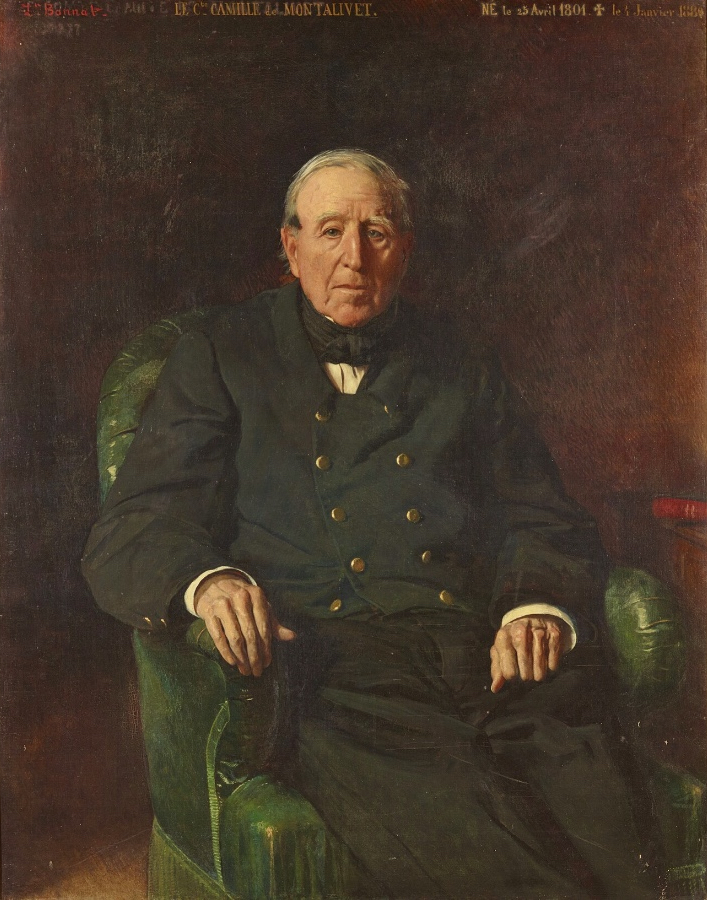
Portrait of the Count of Montalivet by Léon Bonnat

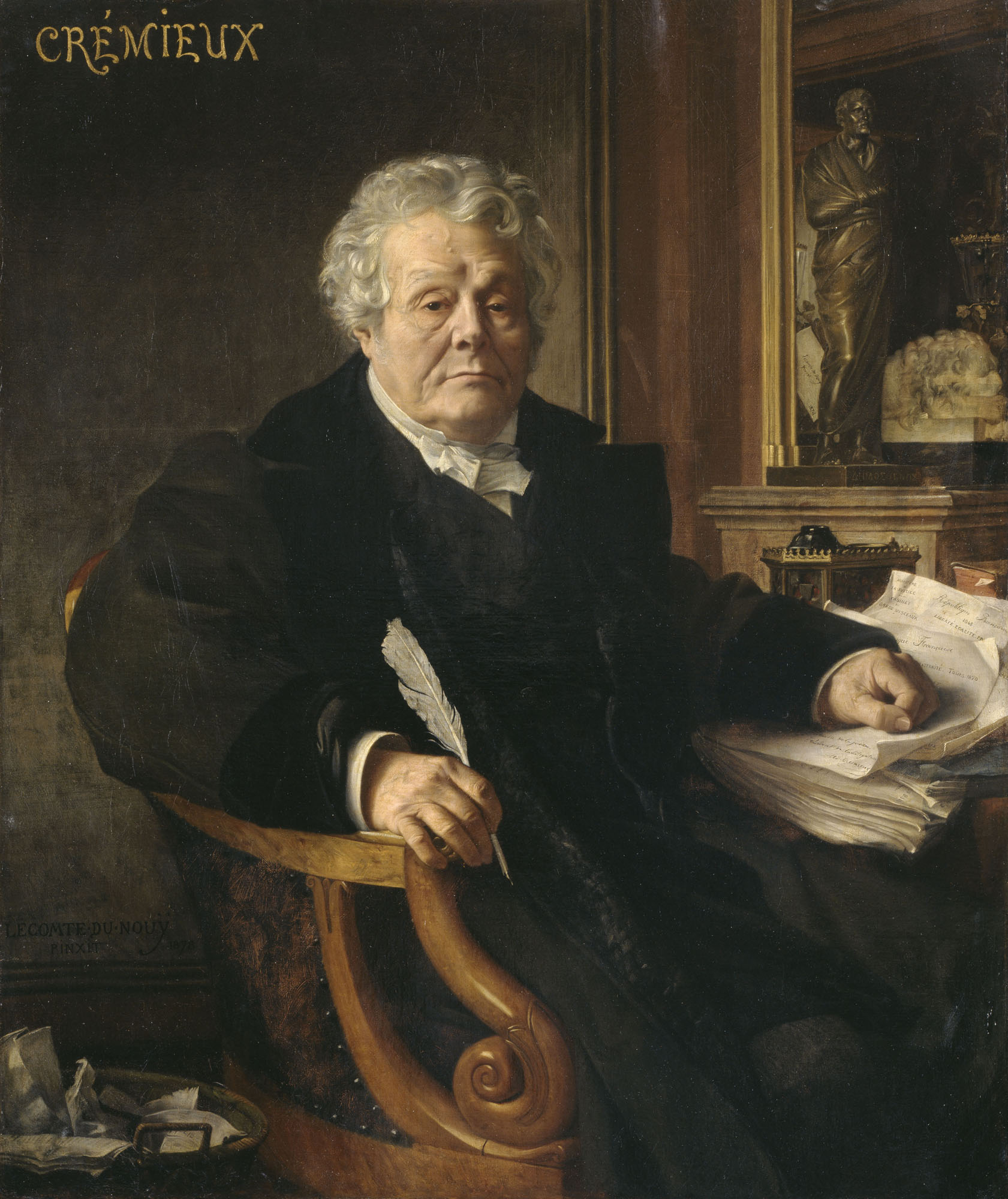
Portrait of Adolphe Crémieux by Jean-Jules-Antoine Lecomte du Nouÿ

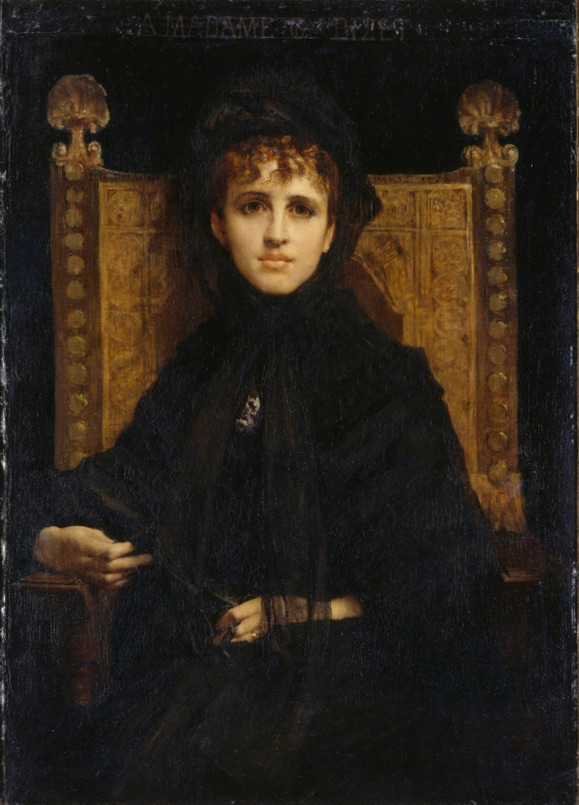
Portrait of Geneviève Halévy by Jules-Élie Delaunay

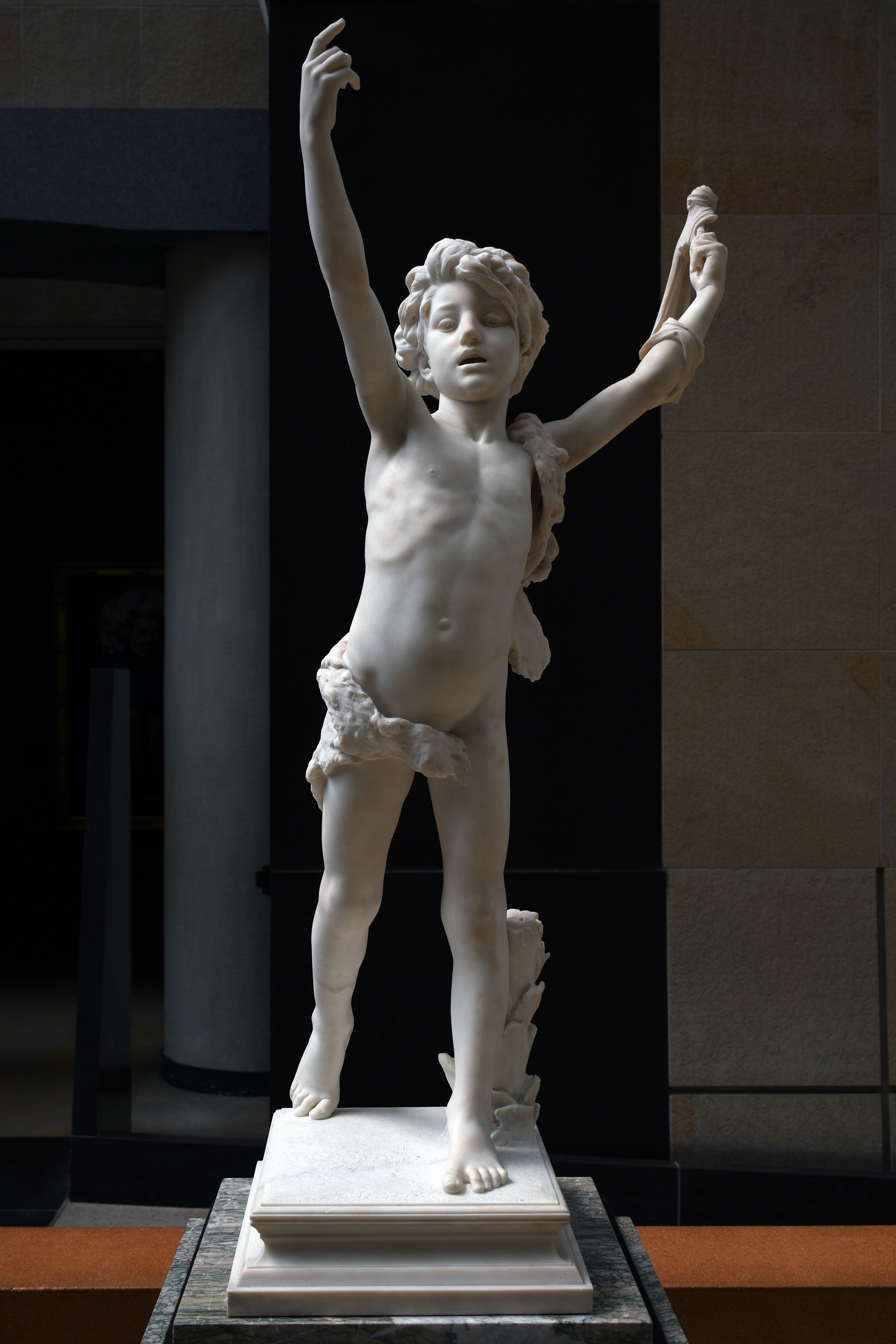
Saint John the Baptist as a Child by Jules-Isidore Lafrance

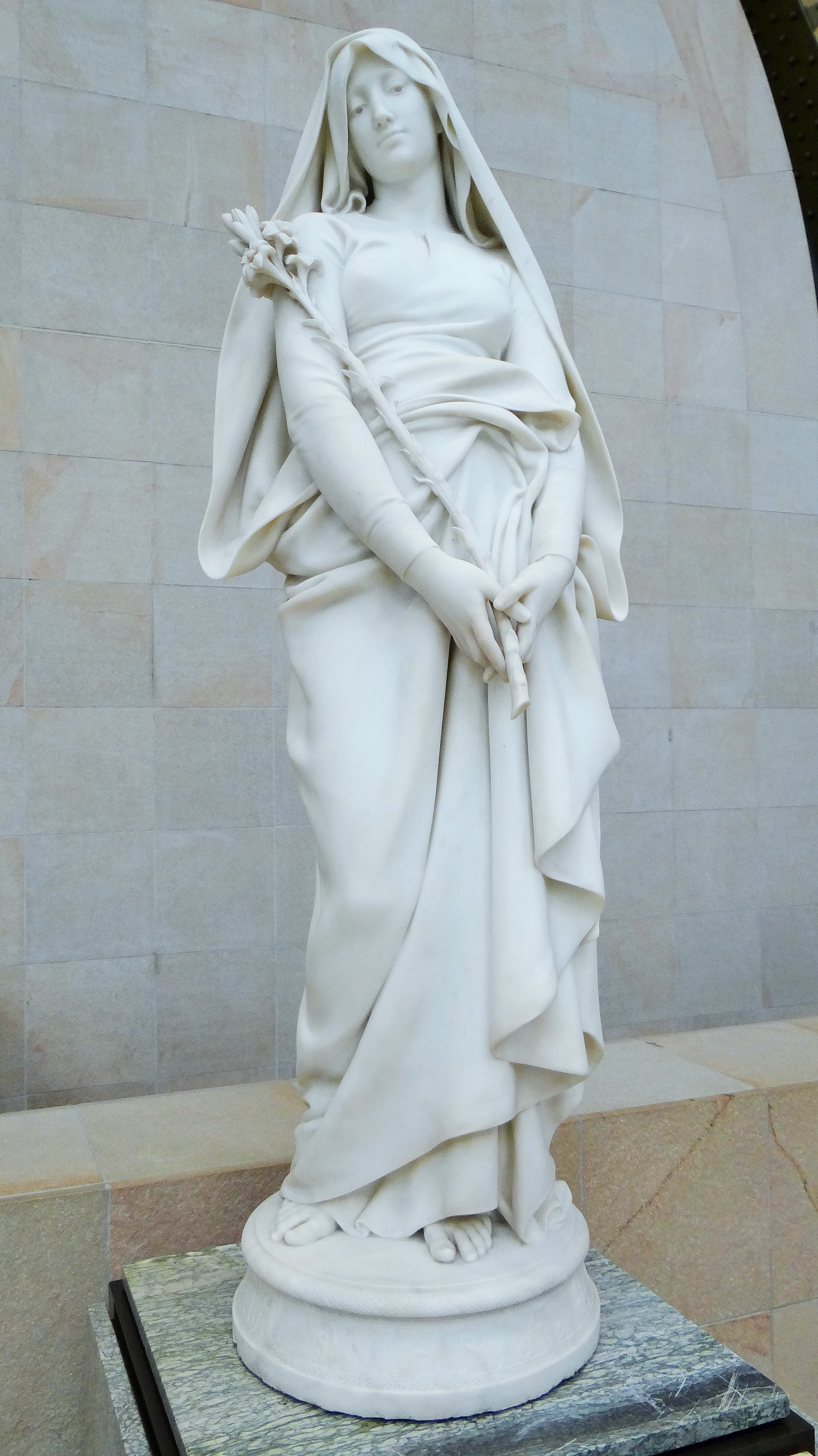
Virgin with a Lily by Eugène Delaplanche

== See also ==
- Royal Academy Exhibition of 1878, held at Burlington House in London

== Bibliography ==
- Allard, Sébastien, Loyrette, Henri & Des Cars, Laurence. Nineteenth Century French Art: From Romanticism to Impressionism, Post-Impressionism and Art Nouveau. Rizzoli International Publications, 2007.
- Brauer, Fae. Rivals and Conspirators: The Paris Salons and the Modern Art Centre. Cambridge Scholars Publishing, 2014.
- Madsen, Annelise K. John Singer Sargent & Chicago's Gilded Age. Art Institute of Chicago, 20
- Wheldon, Keith. Renoir and His Art. Book Value International, 1981.
