= The Cup of Chocolate =

Painting by Pierre-Auguste Renoir in the Louvre Abu Dhabi

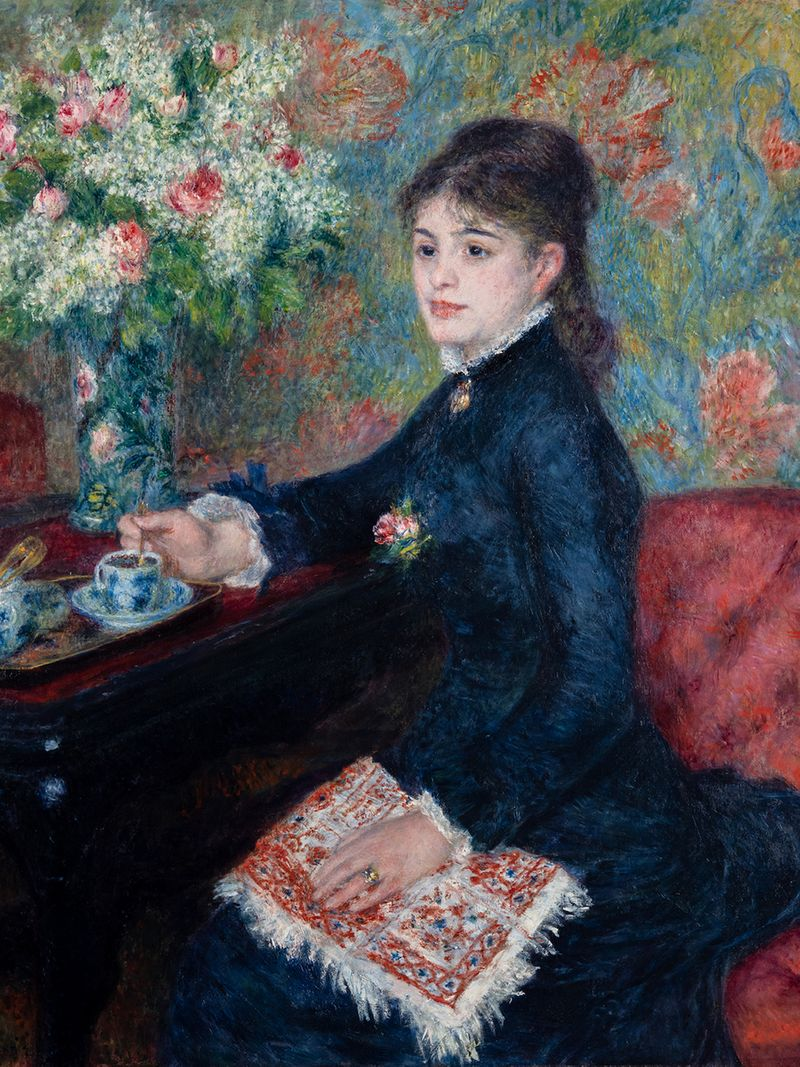
- Artist: Pierre-Auguste Renoir
- Year: 1877-78
- Medium: oil on canvas
- Dimensions: 100 cm × 81 cm (39 in × 32 in)
- Location: Louvre Abu Dhabi; Abu Dhabi

The Cup of Chocolate is an oil on canvas painting by the French artist Pierre-Auguste Renoir (1841–1919), featuring a model known as Margot. (Note: Margot was also known as Marguerite Legrand. Her real name on her birth certificate was Alma-Henriette Leboeuf, but she was also known as Henriette-Anna Leboeuf. Renoir tells Vollard that he recalls the painting and the model's name as Marguerite, and that she was his preferred model, "a type of woman that I loved to paint".) The painting, dated between 1877 and 1878, depicts a portrait of a young French bourgeois woman drinking either coffee or chocolate in a setting of luxury. Formerly held by private collectors, the painting was acquired by the Louvre Abu Dhabi in 2022.

== Background ==
Like the rest of the Impressionists at this time, Renoir was not having much success with his exhibitions. He decided to change directions and declined to submit any works to the Impressionist exhibition in March 1878, choosing to submit The Cup of Chocolate to the Salon of 1878 that same year instead. This choice gave Renoir the opportunity to pursue new clientele, leading to new portrait commissions. Renoir told art dealer Paul Durand-Ruel (1831–1922), "There are in Paris scarcely fifteen art-lovers capable of liking a painting without Salon approval. There are 80,000 who won't buy an inch of canvas if the painter is not in the Salon...My submitting to the Salon is entirely a business matter."

Italian art critic Diego Martelli declared that Renoir had "deserted" the Impressionists and was encouraged by French salonist and art collector Marguerite Charpentier to go back to the Salon of 1878. Renoir submitted the painting to the Salon under the title Le café. It was accepted, but received little critical notice at the time.

Margot replaced Lise Tréhot as Renoir's favorite model, but she died tragically at the age of 23 in 1879 from smallpox. After a period of grieving which prevented him doing any work, Renoir would find success just months later at the Salon of 1879 with Madame Georges Charpentier and Her Children. After Margot's death, Aline Charigot began sitting for Renoir, becoming his wife just several years later.

== Related works ==
Two additional works from 1912 and 1914 with the title Cup of Chocolate are held by the Barnes Foundation.

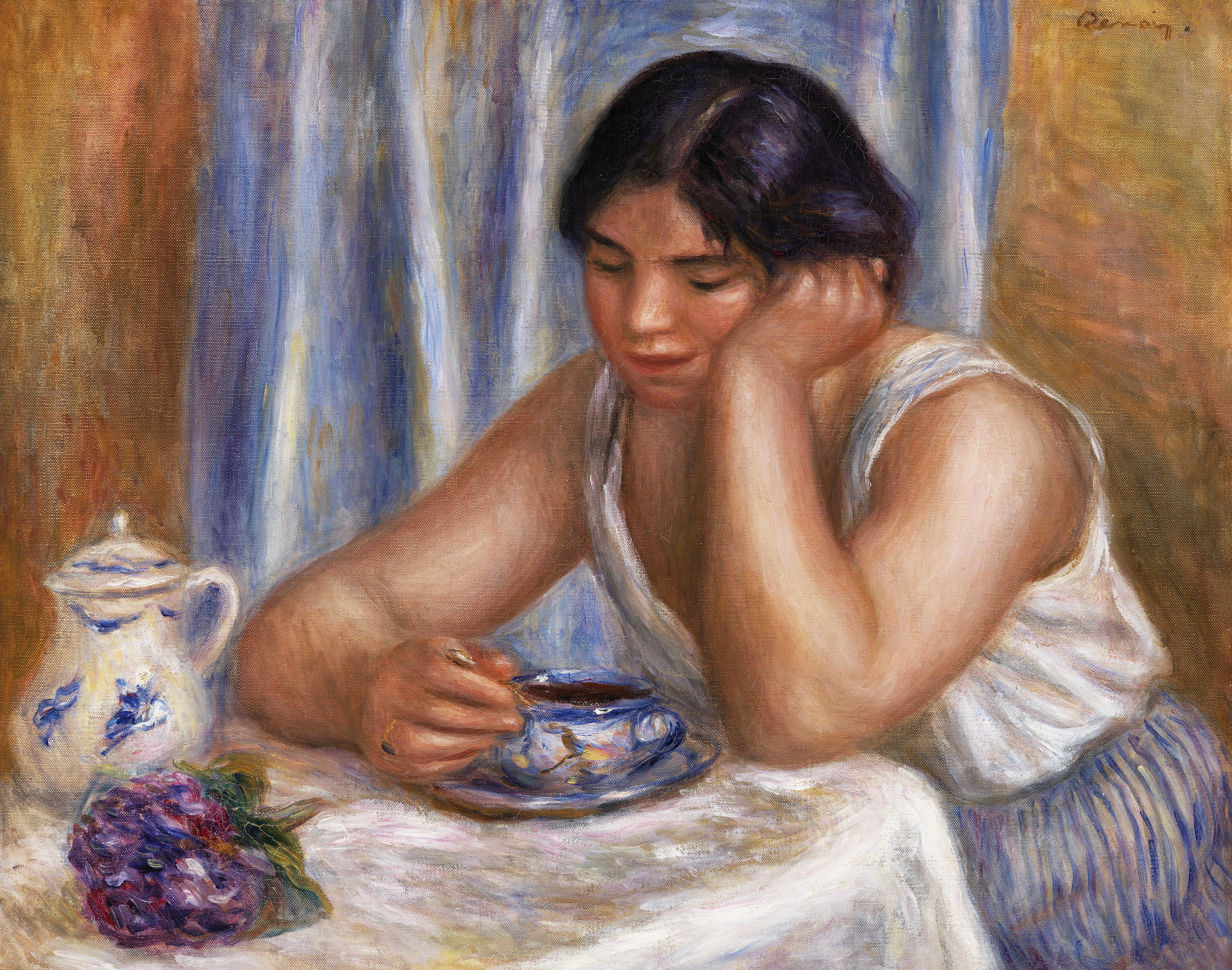
Cup of Chocolate (Femme prenant du chocolat) (1912)

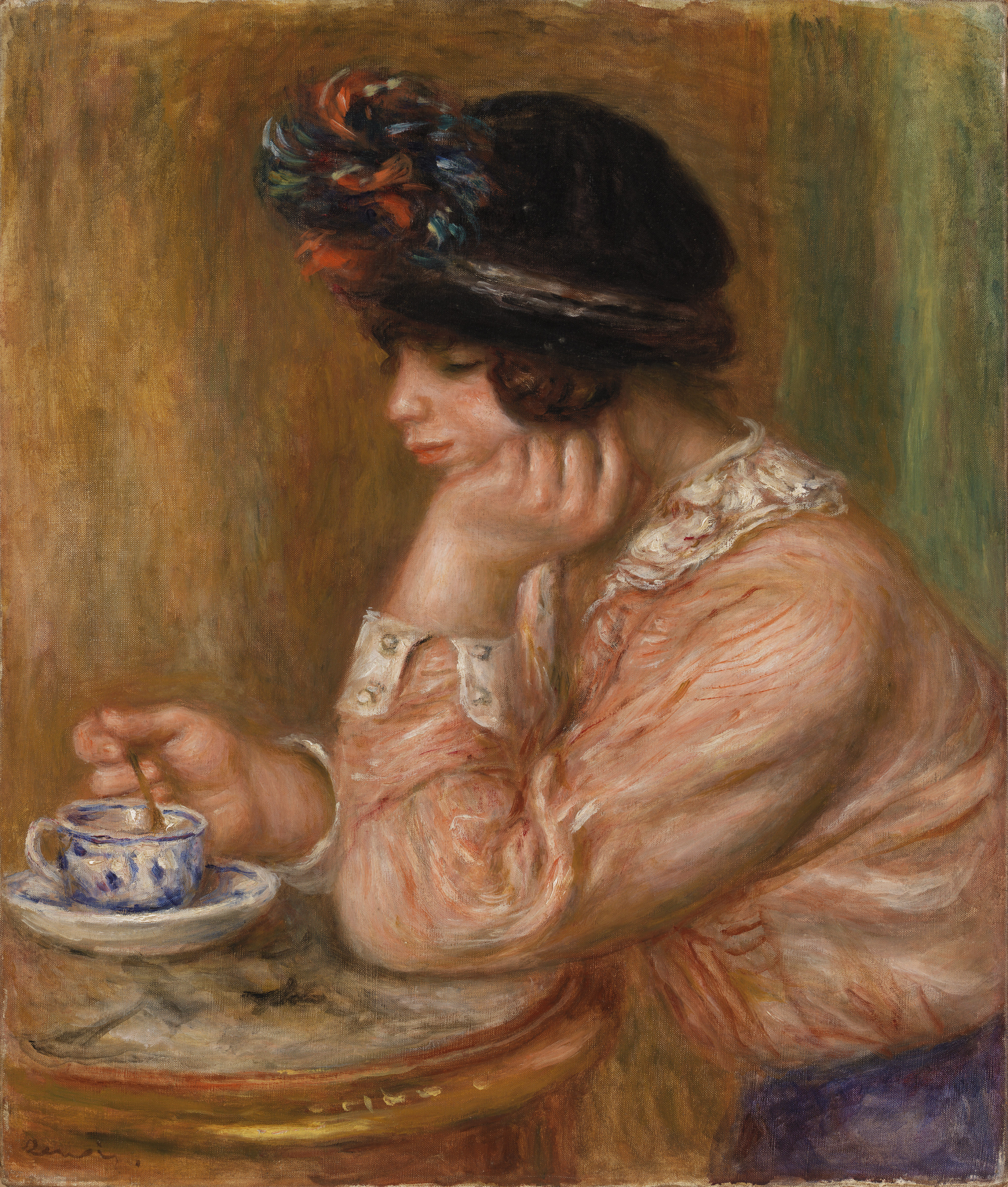
Cup of Chocolate (La Tasse de chocolat) (1914)

== See also ==
- List of paintings by Pierre-Auguste Renoir

== Bibliography ==
- Agence France-Presse (October 13, 2022). "Louvre Abu Dhabi marks five years with major Impressionism show". Kuwait Times. Retrieved May 8, 2023.
- Bailey, Colin B. (1997). Renoir's Portraits: Impressions of an Age. Yale University Press. National Gallery of Canada. ISBN 0-88884-668-1.
- Distel, Anne (1999). Cézanne to Van Gogh: The Collection of Doctor Gachet. The Metropolitan Museum of Art. ISBN 9780870999031.
- Lucy, Martha. John House (2012). Renoir in the Barnes Foundation. Yale University Press. ISBN 9780300151008. OCLC 742017633.
- Monneret, Sophie (1990). Renoir. Konecky & Konecky. ISBN 1568522495. OCLC 21902262.
- Patry, Sylvie (2022). "Impressionism: Pathways to Modernity". On Show. Louvre Abu Dhabi. Retrieved May 8, 2023.
- Rewald, John (1961). The History of Impressionism. Museum of Modern Art. OCLC 877360723.
- Strieter, Terry W. (1999). Nineteenth-century European Art: A Topical Dictionary. Greenwood Press. ISBN 9780313298981.
- Vollard, Ambroise (1925). Renoir: An Intimate Record. Trans. by Harold L. Van Doren and Randolph T. Weaver. Alfred A. Knopf. ISBN 9780486264882. OCLC 23082906.
- White, Barbara Ehrlich (2017). Renoir: An Intimate Biography. Thames & Hudson. ISBN 9780500774038. OCLC 1012226709.
