= The Wolf of Gubbio =

Painting by Luc-Olivier Merson

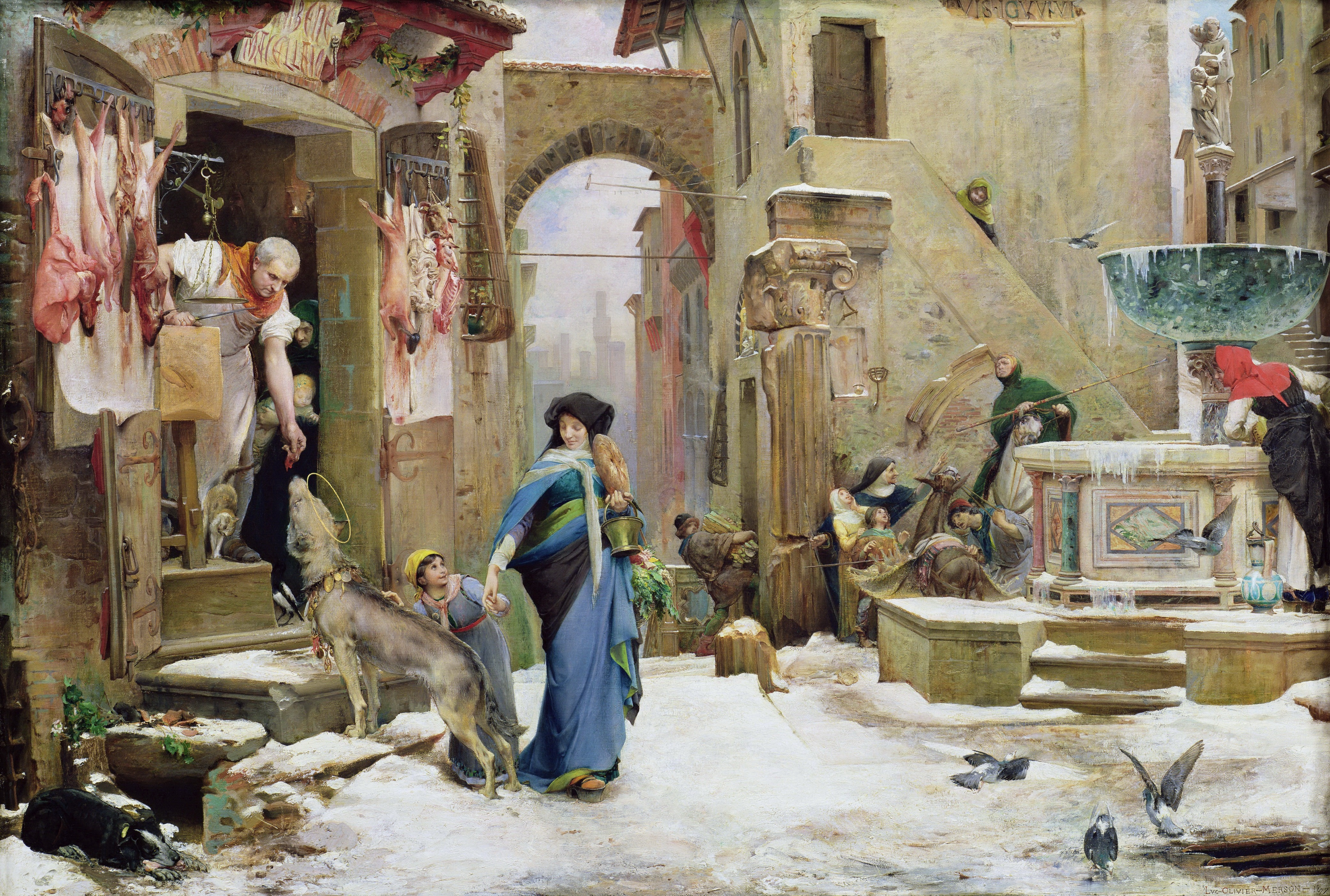
The Wolf of Gubbio (1877) by Luc-Olivier Merson

The Wolf of Gubbio is an 1877 oil on canvas painting by Luc-Olivier Merson, dedicated to his former student, collaborator and friend Adolphe Giraldon and exhibited at the Paris Salon of 1878. It was acquired by its present owner, the Palais des Beaux-Arts de Lille, in 1881. It is inspired by a legend of Francis of Assisi and the wolf of Gubbio in Italy.
