= Setting Out to Fish =

Painting by John Singer Sargent

- Artist: John Singer Sargent
- Year: 1878
- Type: Oil on canvas, genre painting
- Dimensions: 78.7 cm × 122.9 cm (31.0 in × 48.4 in)
- Location: National Gallery of Art, Washington D.C.

Setting Out to Fish (French: En route pour la pêche) is an 1878 oil painting by the American artist John Singer Sargent showing a group of woman and children in the village of Cancale in Brittany heading out to find shellfish for their evening meal. It is also known as Oyster Gatherers of Cancale.

While stylistically many of his early works shows the influence of French Impressionism , different from the High society portraits he later became best known for after moving to London, this reflects a deliberately more academic approach. Singer Sargent took great care readying the painting for exhibition at the Salon of 1878 held in Paris. The picture is now the National Gallery of Art in Washington D.C., which acquired it in 2014 having previously been in the city's Corcoran Gallery of Art.

== See also ==
- List of works by John Singer Sargent

== Bibliography ==
- Madsen, Annelise K. John Singer Sargent & Chicago's Gilded Age. Art Institute of Chicago, 2018.
- Ormond, Richard. Sargent and the Sea. Yale University Press, 2009.
