= Virgin with a Lily =

Sculpture by Eugène Delaplanche

Virgin with a lily
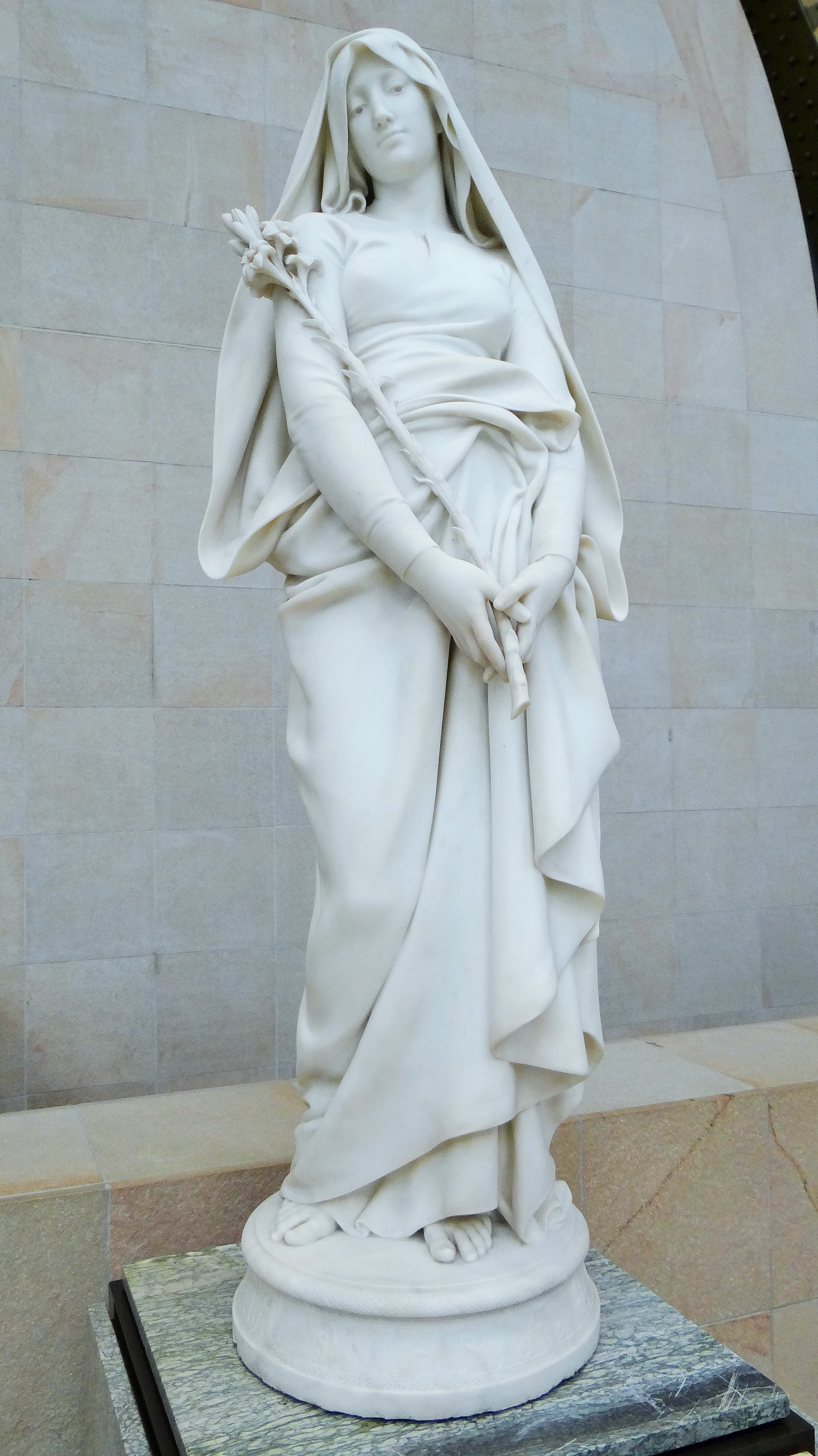
- Artist: Eugène Delaplanche
- Year: 1878
- Type: Sculpture
- Medium: Marble
- Location: Musée d'Orsay, Paris

The Virgin with a lily (French: Vierge au lys) is a marble sculpture on a pedestal executed in 1878 by the French sculptor Eugène Delaplanche. The statue, depicting a virgin holding a lily, was exhibited at the Le Salon peinture et de sculpture de 1878, where it won the médaille d'honneur. It is currently shown at the Musée d'Orsay in Paris.

== History ==
Delaplanche was a member of a group of young sculptors which at the time remained a little withdrawn. In 1878, when the work was created, it appeared at the Salon of 1878, then transferred the same year to the Fabre Museum in Montpellier. From 1889 onwards, it was taken to the Musée du Luxembourg in Paris. The work was exhibited at the Louvre Museum in 1926 before being transferred in 1986 to the Musée d'Orsay, where it currently resides.

It was exhibited on the Champ de Mars of Paris during the Exposition Universelle in 1889.

== Description ==
The sculpture, of biblical iconography, represents the virgin standing, veiled, holding a lily in her hands. The artist signed "E. Delaplanche 1878" on the base of the work, on which one can also read "MARIA MATER SANCTA". The work is 199.8 cm high, 60.0 cm wide and 61.0 cm deep.

The work is dominated by softness: the body leans lightly on its left leg. The serious expression of the virgin's face allows the author to avoid giving it a childish and meek appearance. Some contemporary critics find an air of despondency, torpor or even disillusionment to the statue.

One critic said of the work: "It is an exquisite thing of mystical feeling that this Virgin with the lily. Fra Angelico never dreamt of anything purer and Donatello never did anything more candid ".
