= Eugène Delaplanche =

French sculptor (1836–1891)

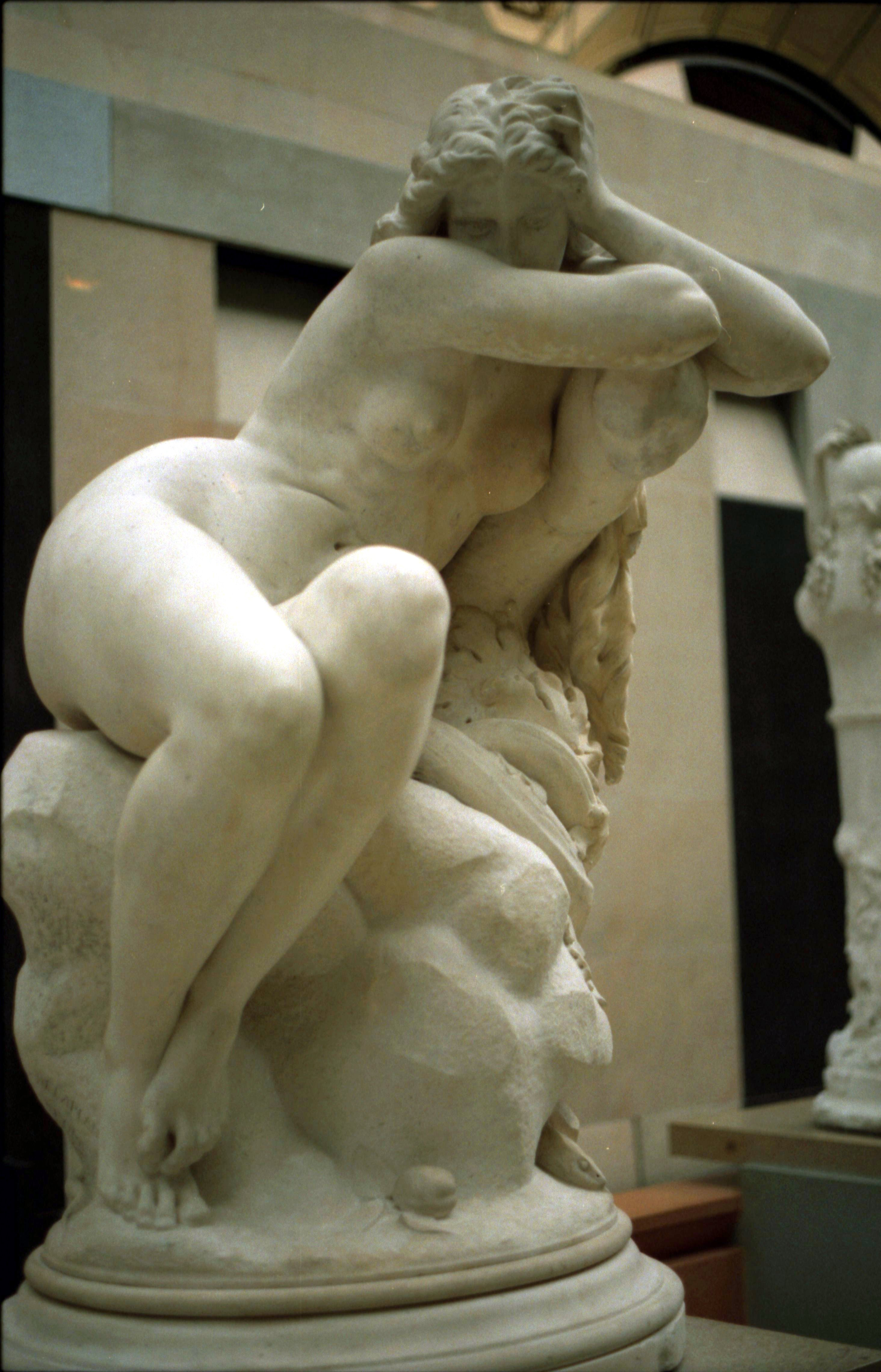
Eve After the Fall 1869, Musée d'Orsay

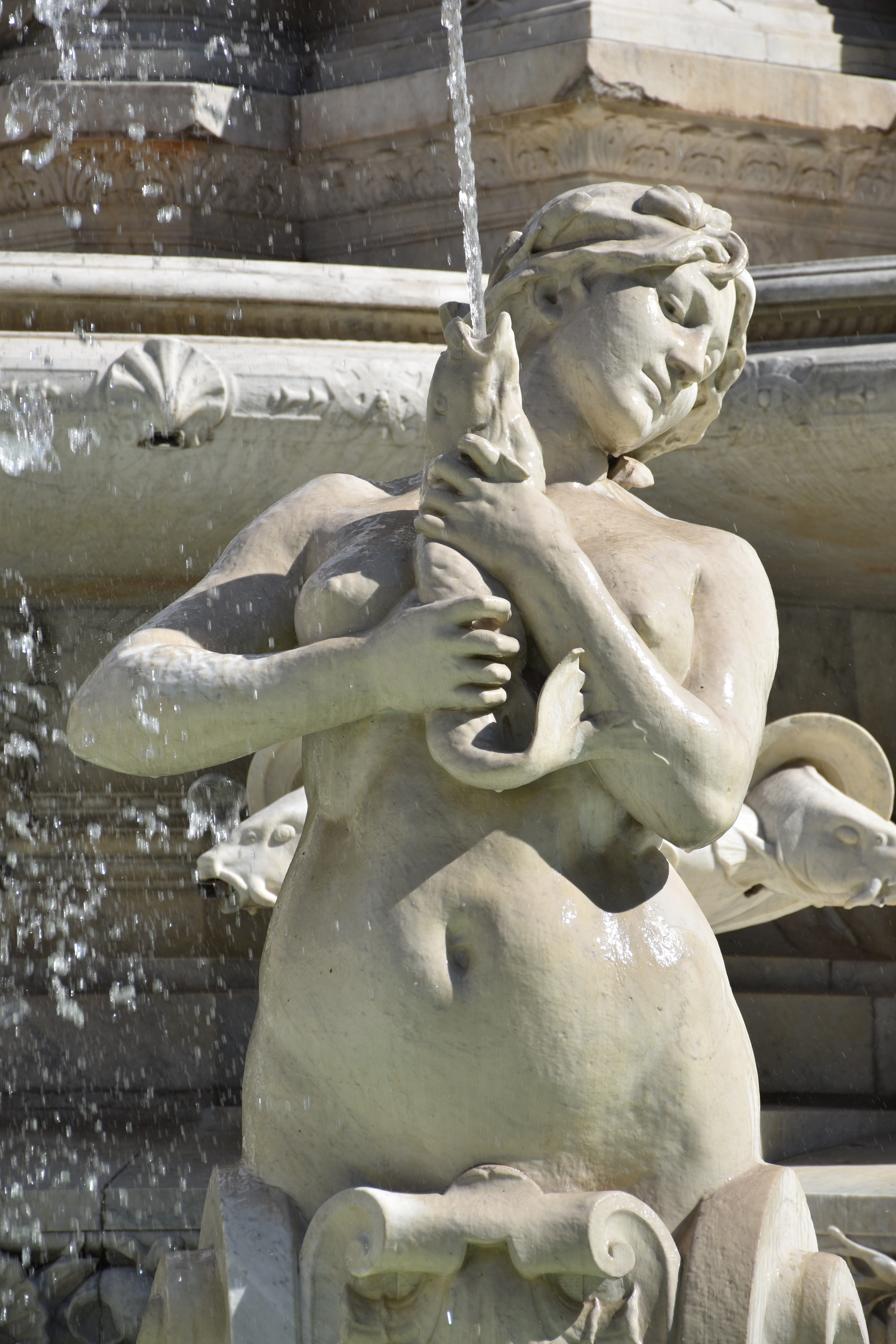
Siren from the Fontaine des Jacobins, Lyon (1884)

Eugène Delaplanche (28 February 1836 – 10 January 1891) was a French sculptor, born at Belleville (Seine).

== Life ==
He was a pupil of Duret, gained the Prix de Rome in 1864 (spending 1864–67 at the Villa Medici in Rome), and the medal of honor in 1878. His "Messenger of Love" (1874), "Aurora" (1878), and the "Virgin of the Lillies" (1884), are in the Luxembourg. Other works by him are "Music" (1878, Paris Opera House), called his masterpiece; "Eve After the Fall" (1869); "Maternal Instruction" (1875, Square of Sainte-Clothilde, Paris); and the statues of "Security" and "Commerce" (1884) in the Hôtel de Ville, Paris (replicas in the Chicago Art Institute). He is also noted for his decorations in relief on vases of Haviland faience. His best work is naturalistic, but at the same time dignified and simple in line, and shows sound mastery of technique. He is represented by 15 works in the Glyptothek, Copenhagen, and in many other French museums and in churches.

== Works in museums ==
- Musée d'Orsay, Paris
  - Virgin with a Lily, 1878, marble
  - Africa, 1878, bronze, on the parvis of the museum
  - Eve before the Fall, 1891, marble
  - Eve after the Fall, c. 1869, marble
- Child riding a tortoise, 1866, bronze, Marseille, Musée des Beaux-Arts
- Allegory of Air, bronze, Compiègne, Musée Antoine Vivenel
- Allegory of Water, bronze, Compiègne, Musée Antoine Vivenel
- Study of a monk's head, c. 1870, marble, Le Puy-en-Velay, Musée Crozatier
- Saint Agnes, 1873, Église Sainte-Croix, Paulhan in Hérault
- Maternal education, 1875, square Samuel-Rousseau, 7th arrondissement, Paris.

=== Gallery ===
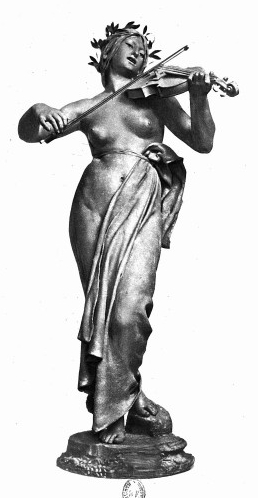
Music
1870. For the Opéra Garnier, 1870.

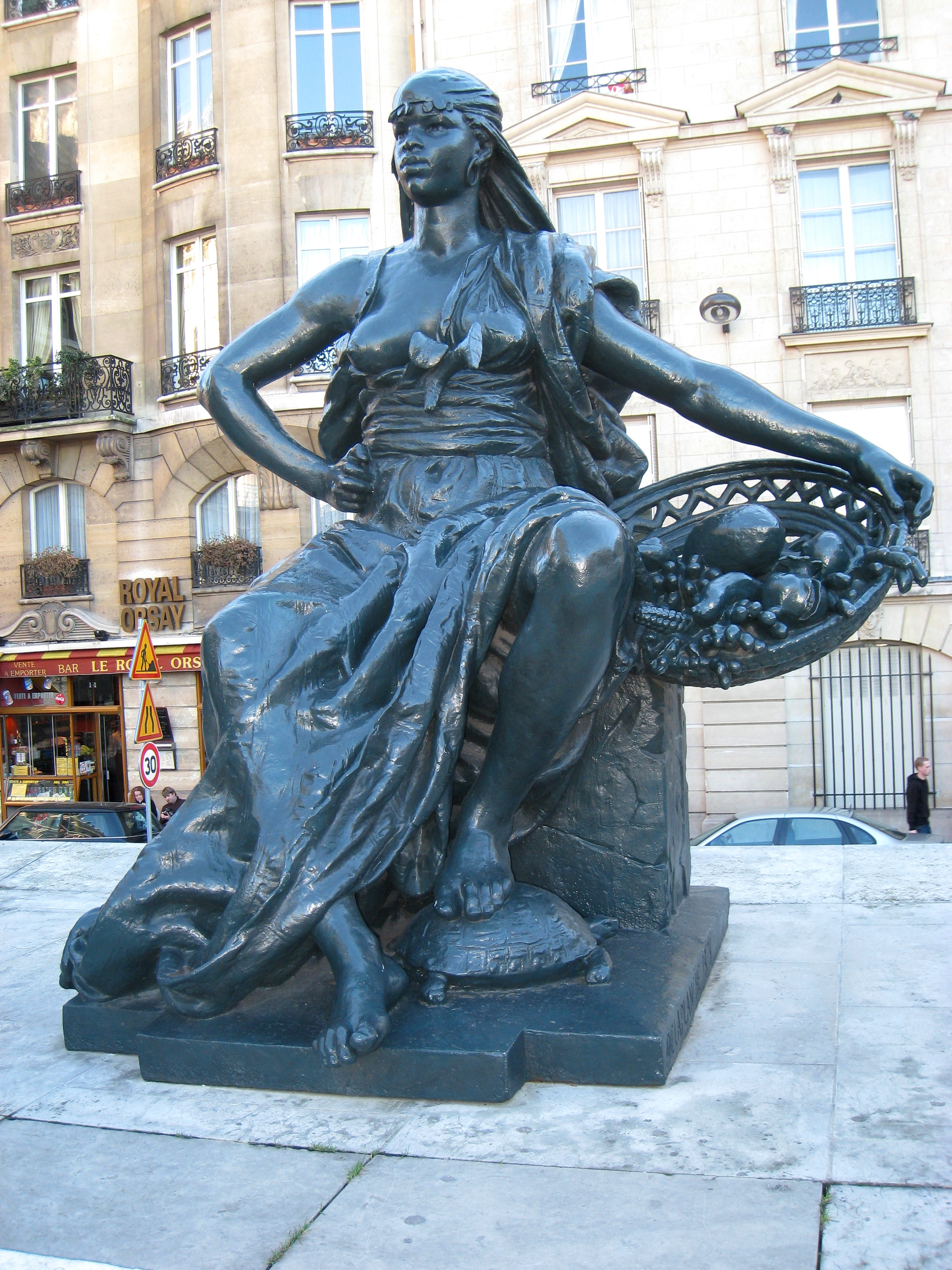
Africa
1878. Parvis of the musée d'Orsay.

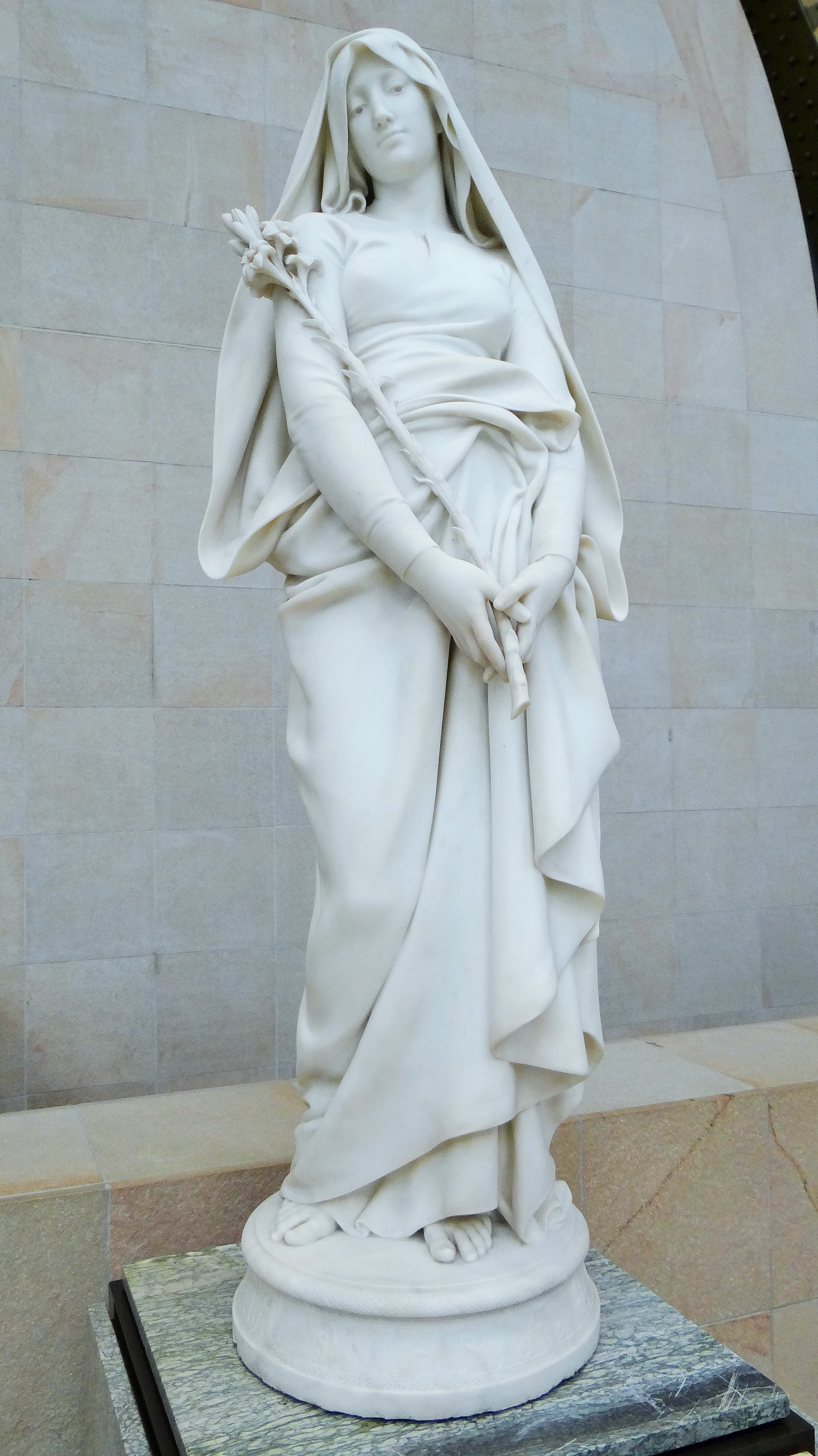
Virgin with a lily
Musée d'Orsay.

== Sources ==
- Eugène Delaplanche in Père-Lachaise Cemetery
