= Burnt Village =

Painting by Albert Edelfelt

- Den brända byn (scen från Klubbekriget 1596) (Swedish), Poltettu kylä (Finnish)
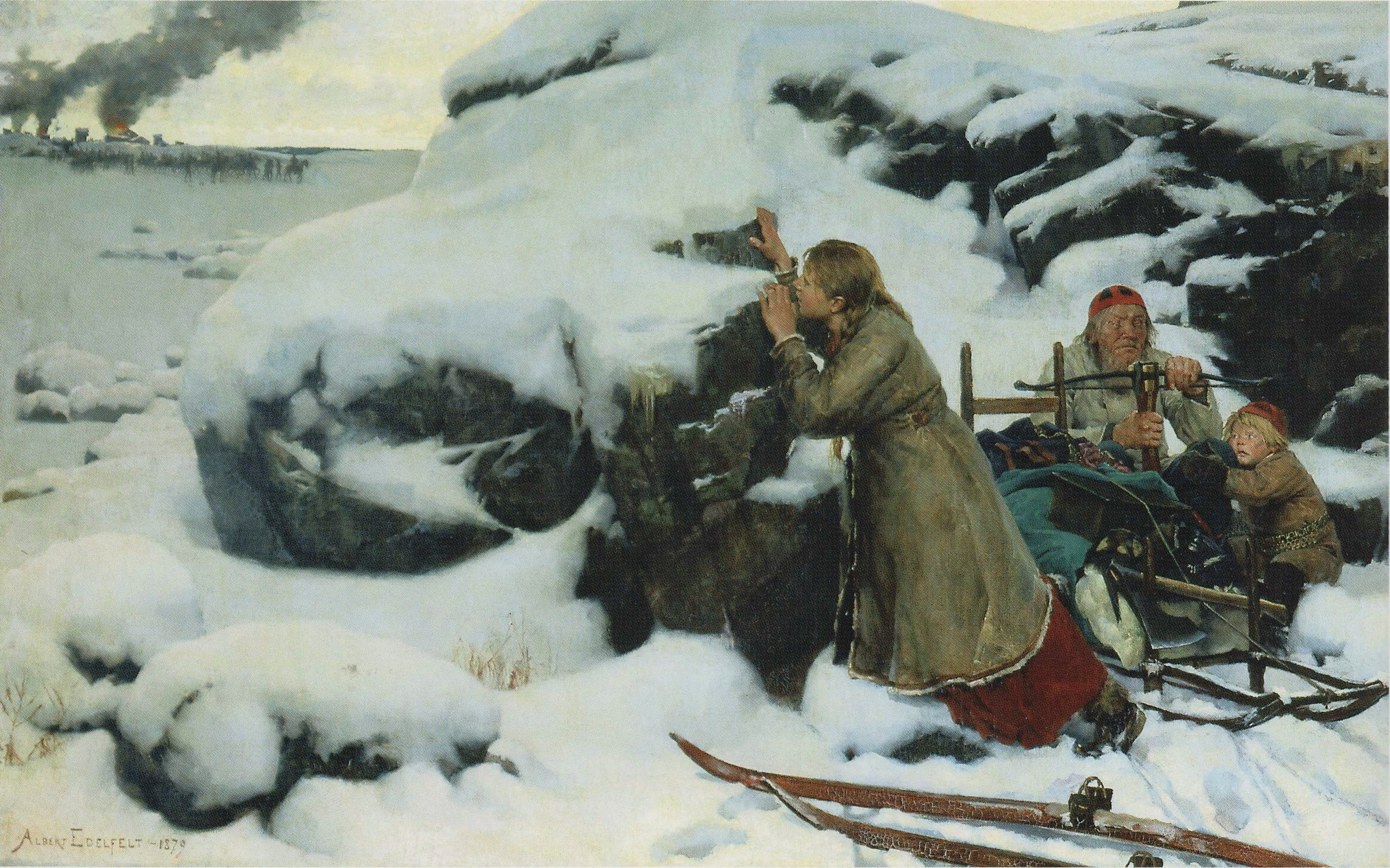
- Artist: Albert Edelfelt
- Year: 1879
- Medium: oil on canvas
- Dimensions: 124 cm × 199 cm (49 in × 78 in)
- Location: Cygnaeus Gallery, Helsinki
- Owner: Cygnaeus Gallery

Burnt Village is an oil-on-canvas painting by Finnish painter Albert Edelfelt completed in 1879.

The painting depicts an imaginary scene from the time of the Cudgel War of 1596–1597, a peasant uprising in Finland, which was then part of the Kingdom of Sweden. In the painting, a Finnish peasant family has fled their home village, which has been burnt down by a military force. The creator Albert Edelfelt donated the painting to Cygnaeus Gallery in Helsinki, Finland, where it is on display.

Edelfelt made a study in oils for the painting in 1878–79. The finished painting was displayed at the Salon of 1879 in Paris.

== Study ==
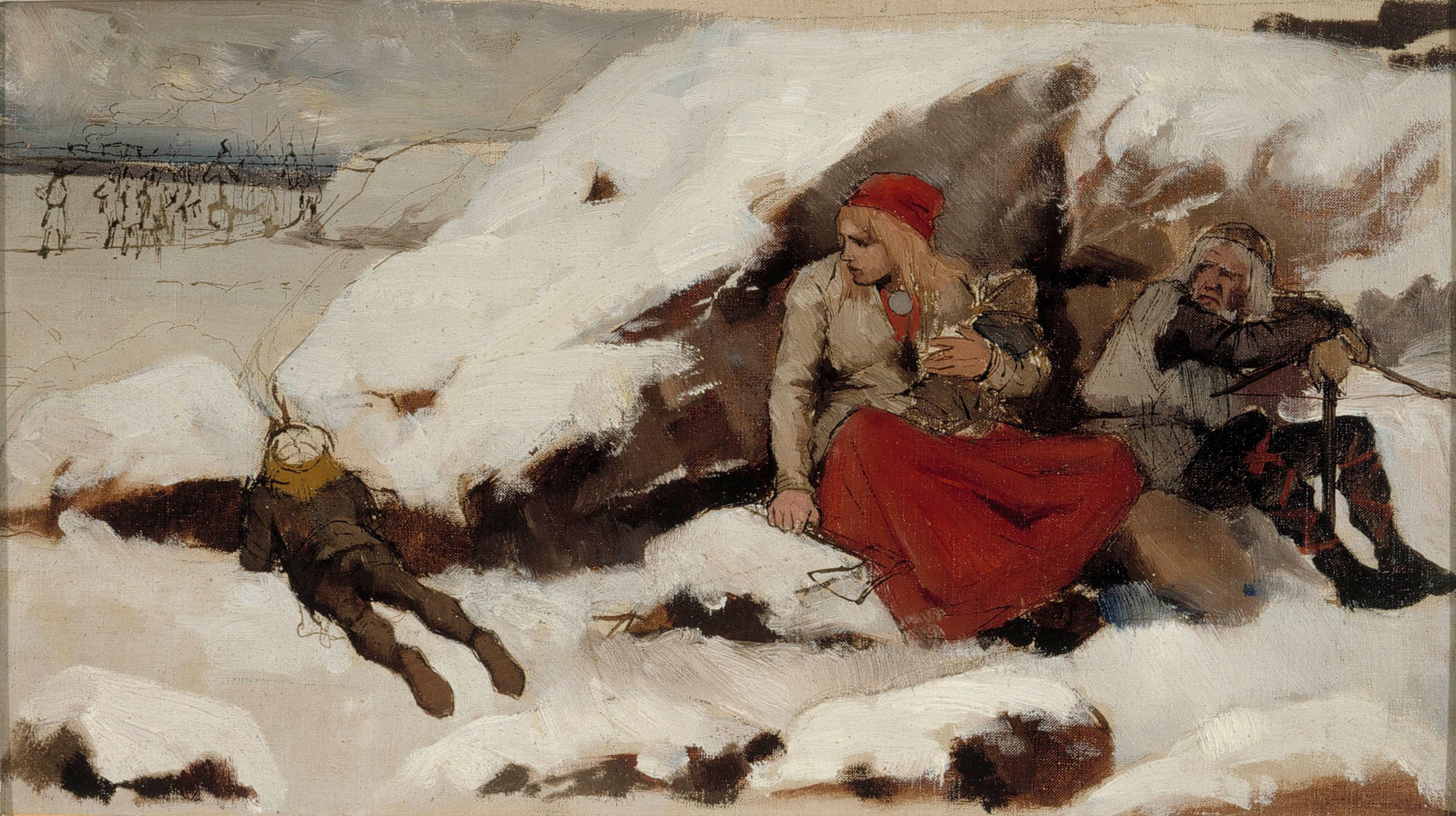
Study made 1878 to 1879 in preparation for the main work
