= Salon of 1879 =

1879 art exhibition in Paris

In the Conservatory by Édouard Manet

The Salon of 1879 was an art exhibition held at the Palace of Industry in Paris which opened on 12 May 1879. The annual Salon organised by the Académie des Beaux-Arts it took place during the Belle Époque and featured many works of Academic art. It should not be confused with the 4th Impressionist Exhibition held in the city the same year.

Édouard Manet, himself closely associated with the Impressionist movement, displayed two works at the Salon In the Conservatory and Boating. while Pierre-Auguste Renoir submitted Madame Georges Charpentier and Her Children William-Adolphe Bouguereau displayed The Birth of Venus which was then purchased by the state to hang in the Musée du Luxembourg.

In portraiture notable works included Portrait of Carolus-Duran by John Singer Sargent and Portrait of Sarah Bernhardt by Jules Bastien-Lepage. Léon Bonnat displayed a picture of the veteran author Victor Hugo. In sculpture Antonin Idrac exhibited Mercury Inventing the Caduceus.

== Gallery ==
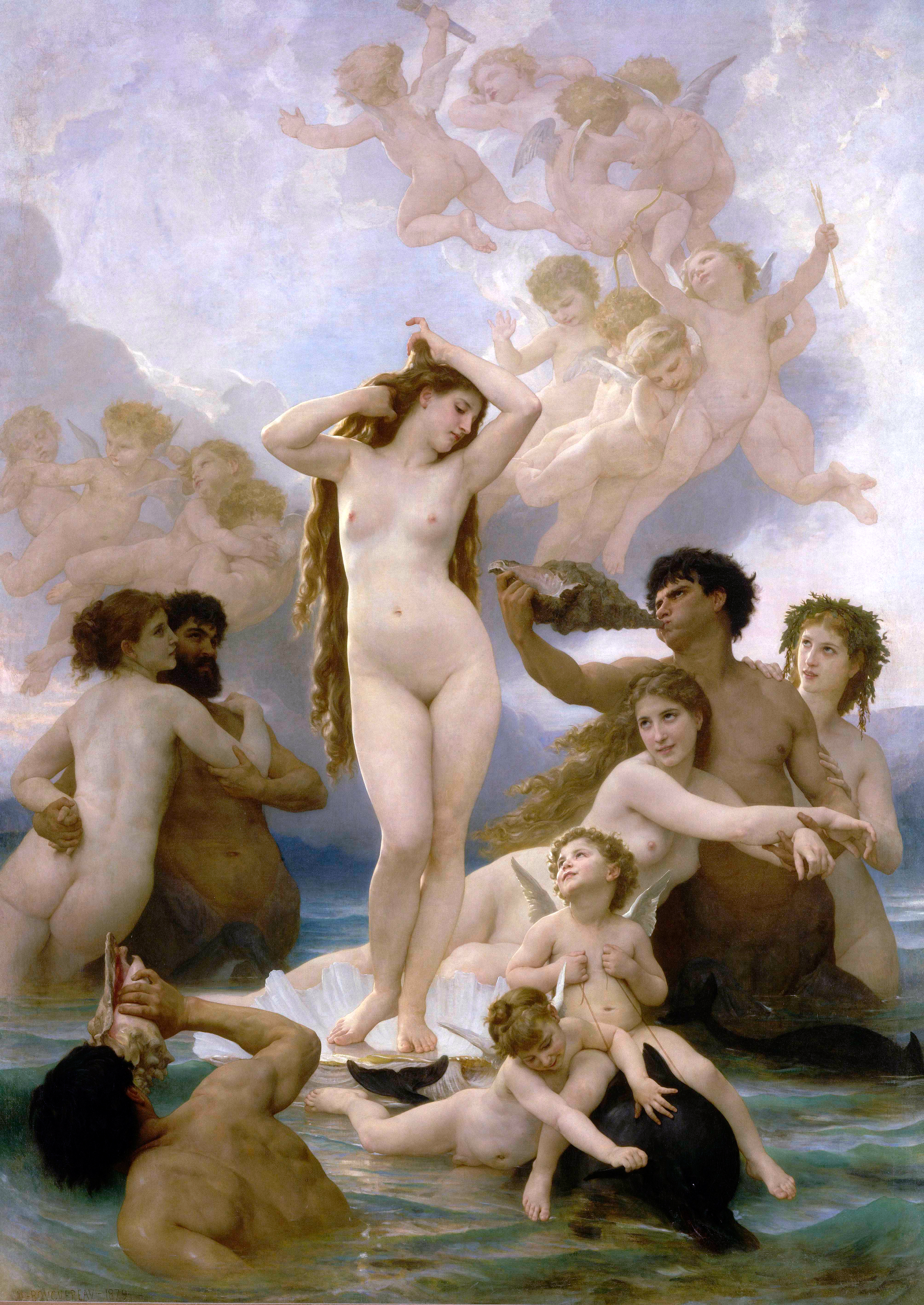
The Birth of Venus by William-Adolphe Bouguereau

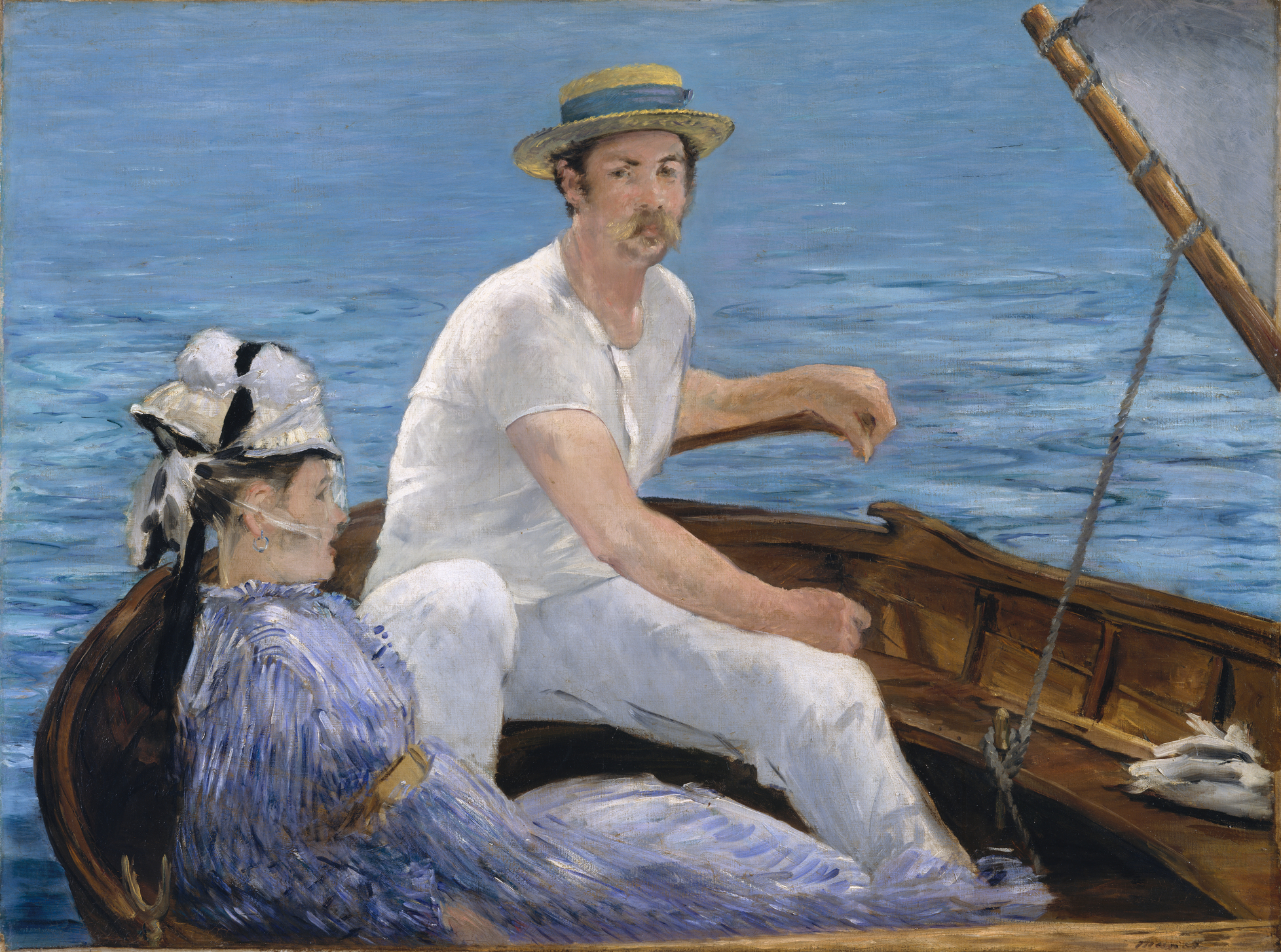
Boating by Édouard Manet

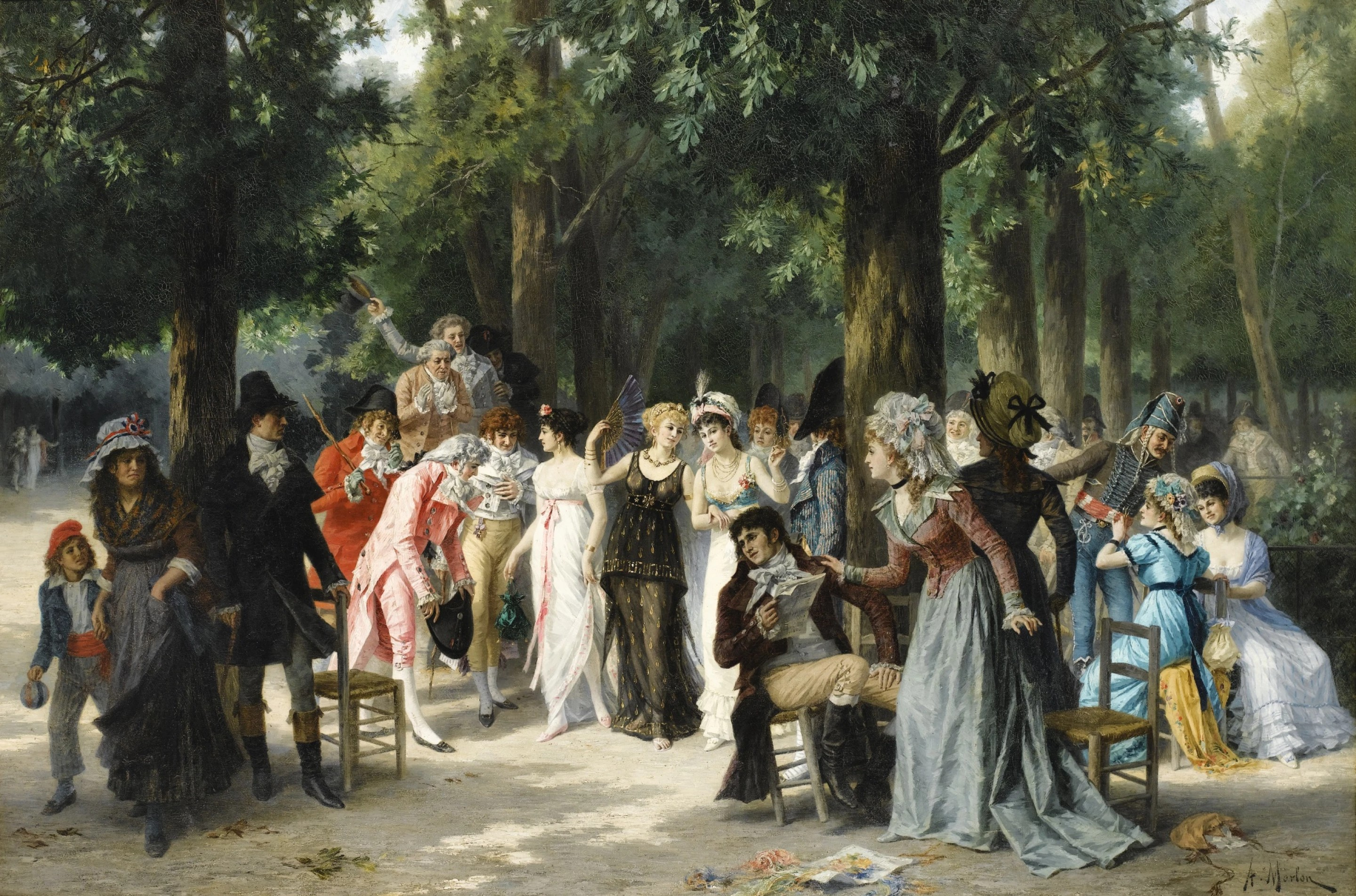
Une mode nouvelle sous le Directoire by Antony Paul Emile Morlon

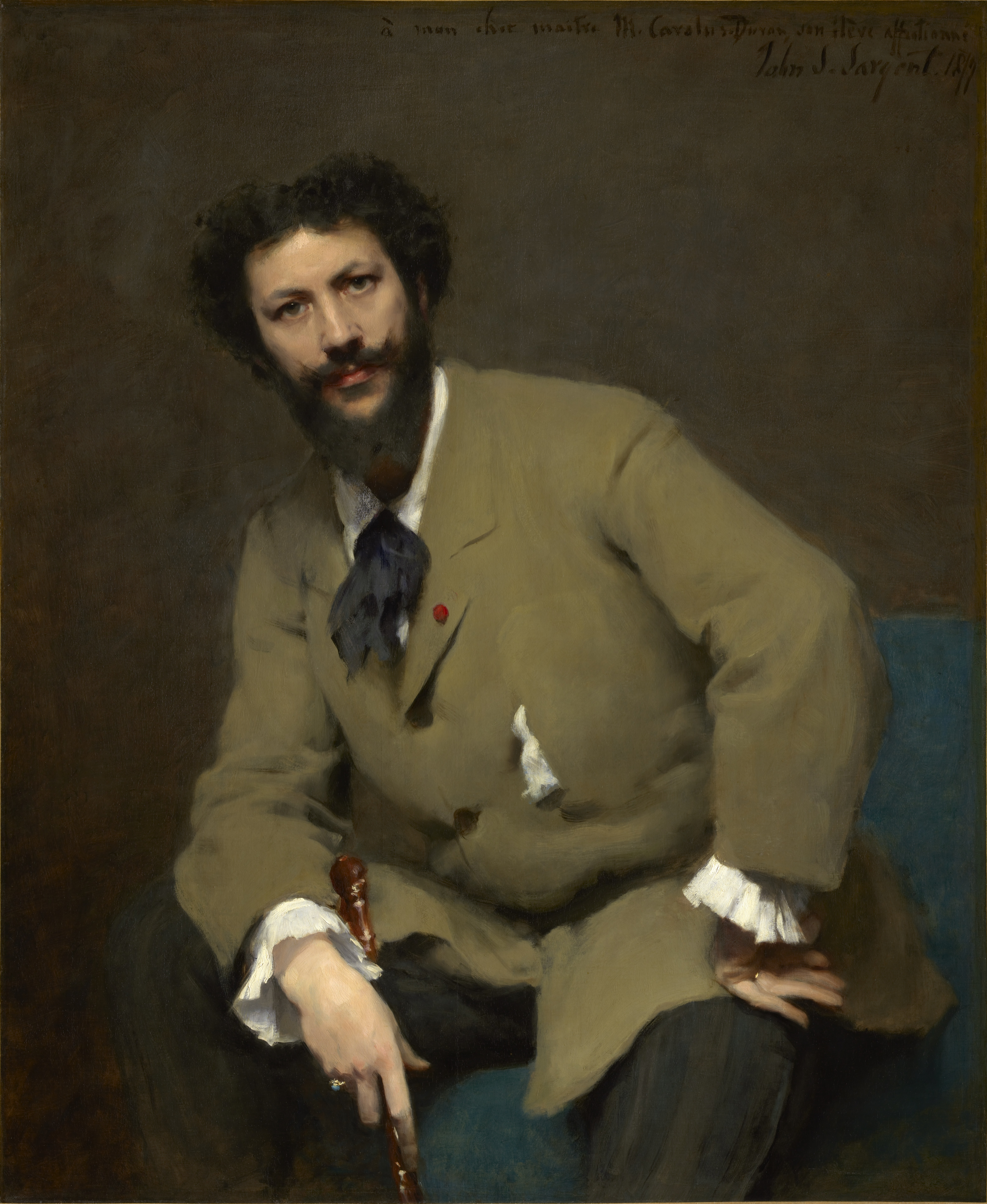
Portrait of Carolus-Duran by John Singer Sargent

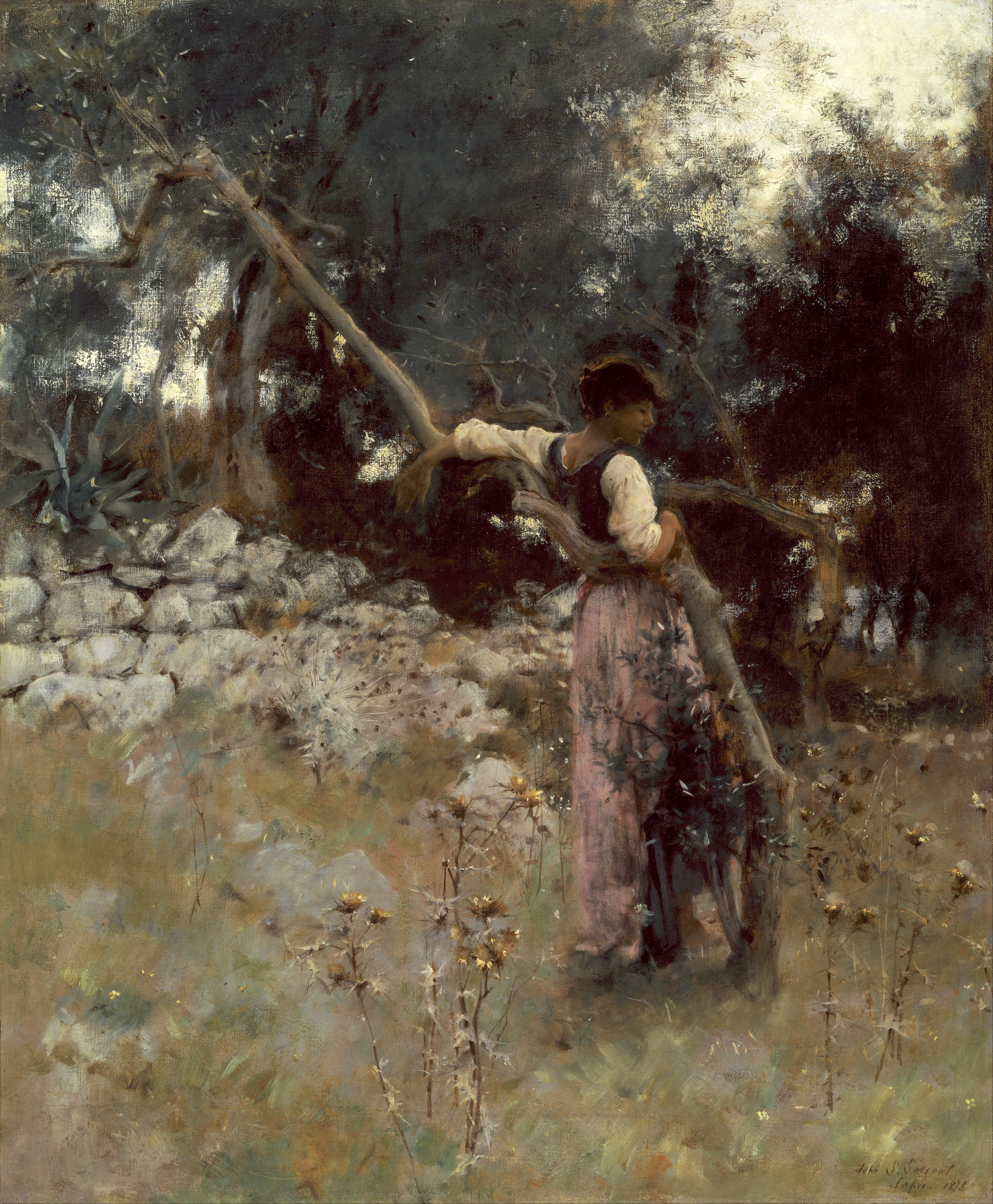
A Capriote by John Singer Sargent

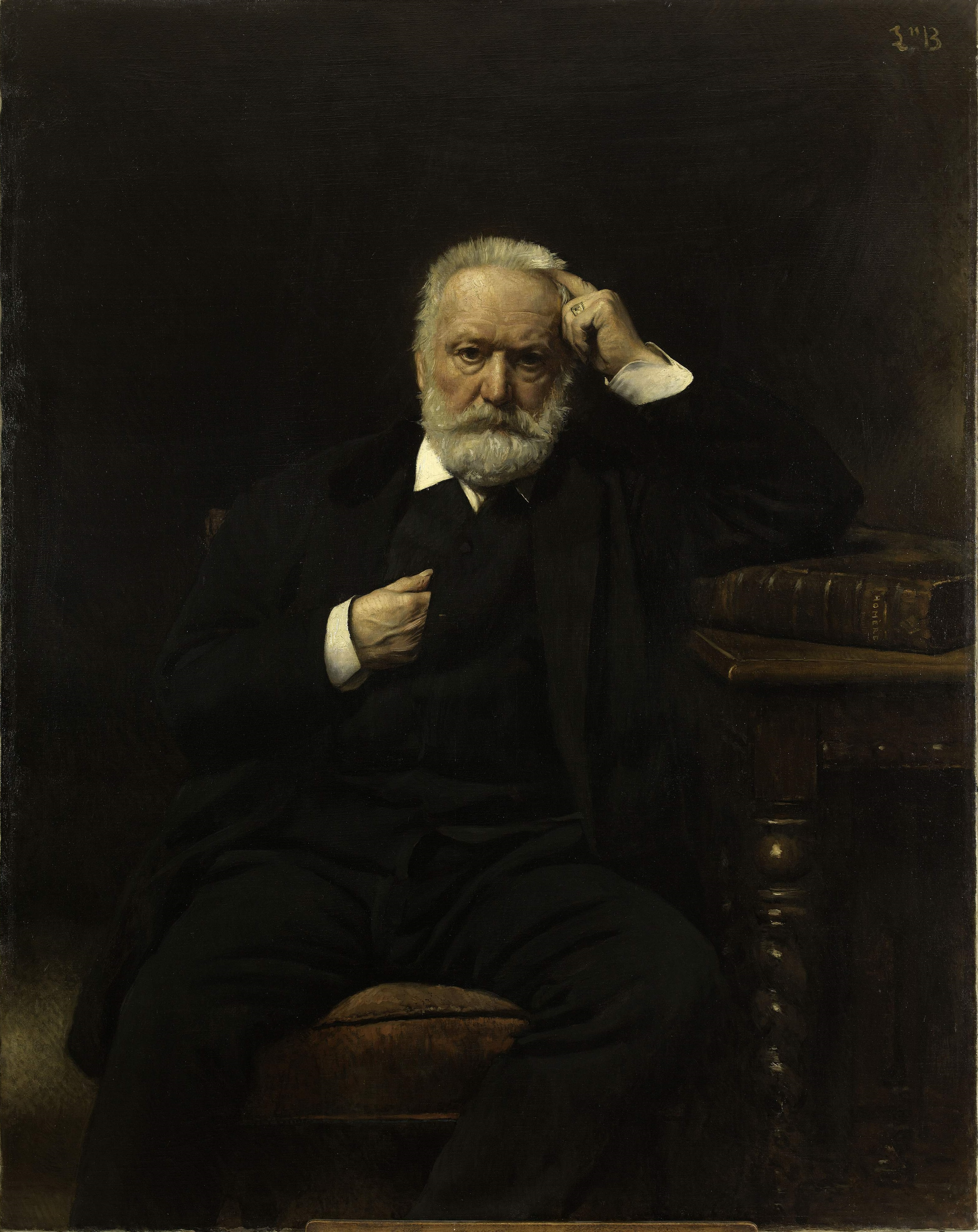
Portrait of Victor Hugo by Léon Bonnat

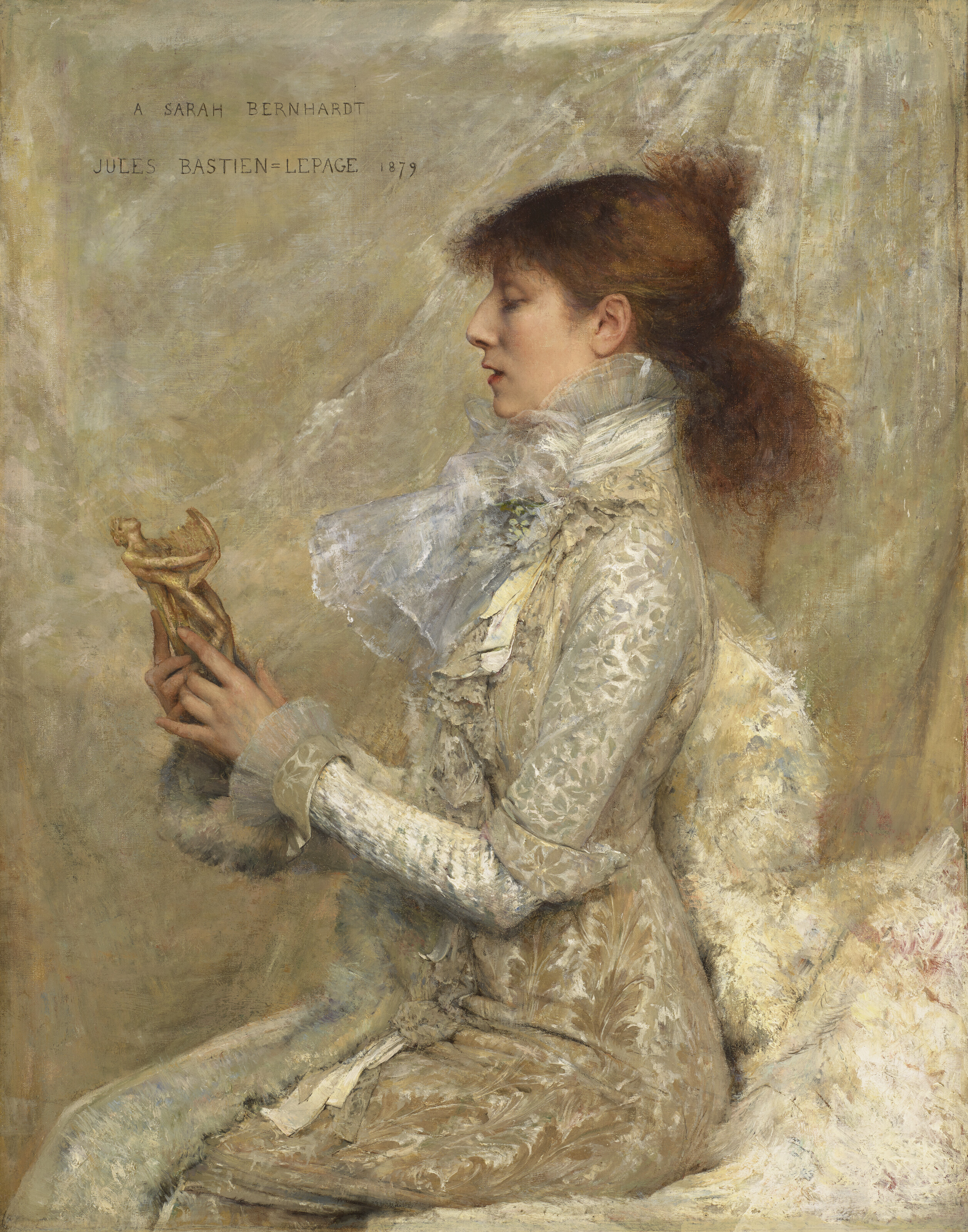
Portrait of Sarah Bernhardt by Jules Bastien-Lepage

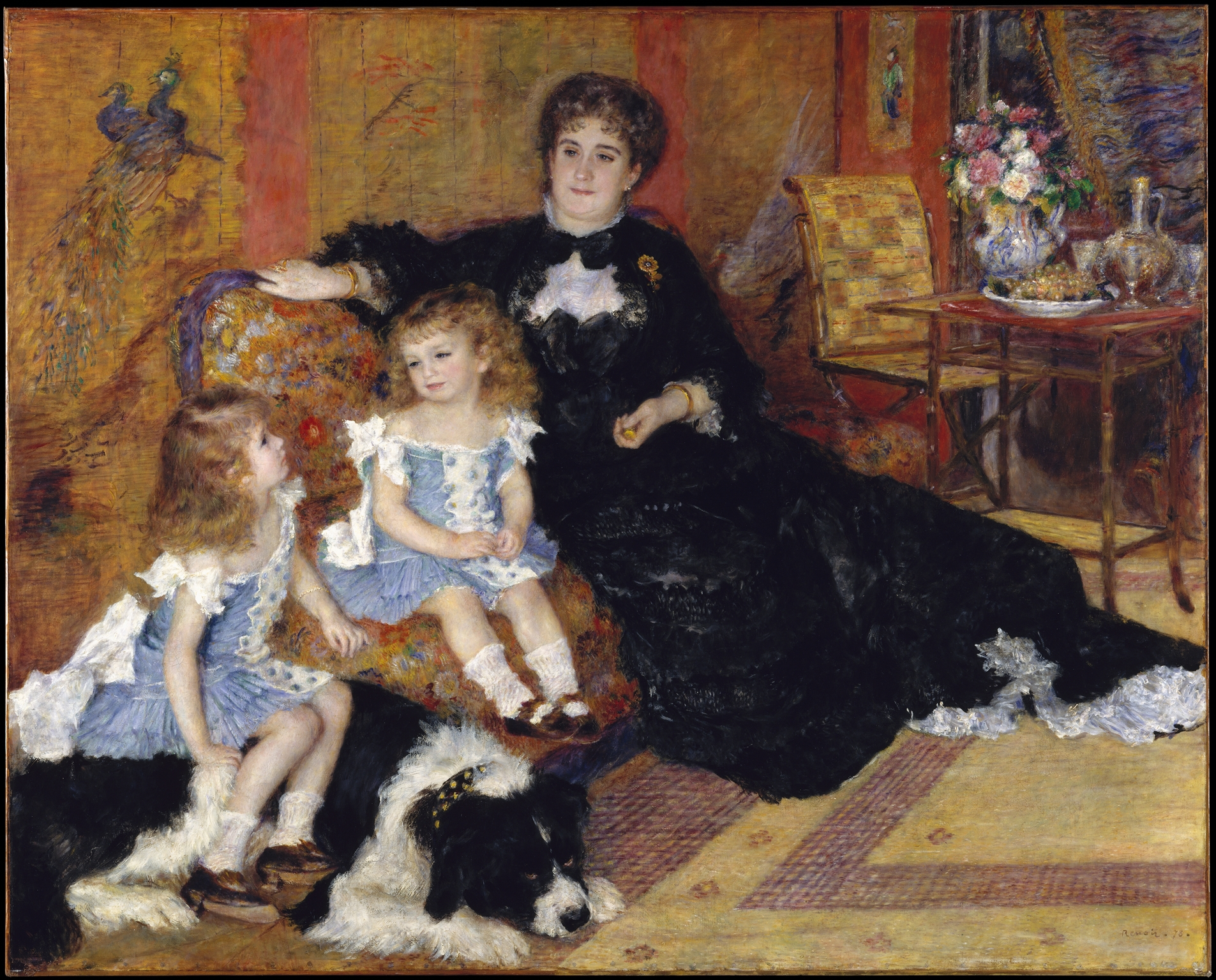
Madame Georges Charpentier and Her Children by Pierre-Auguste Renoir

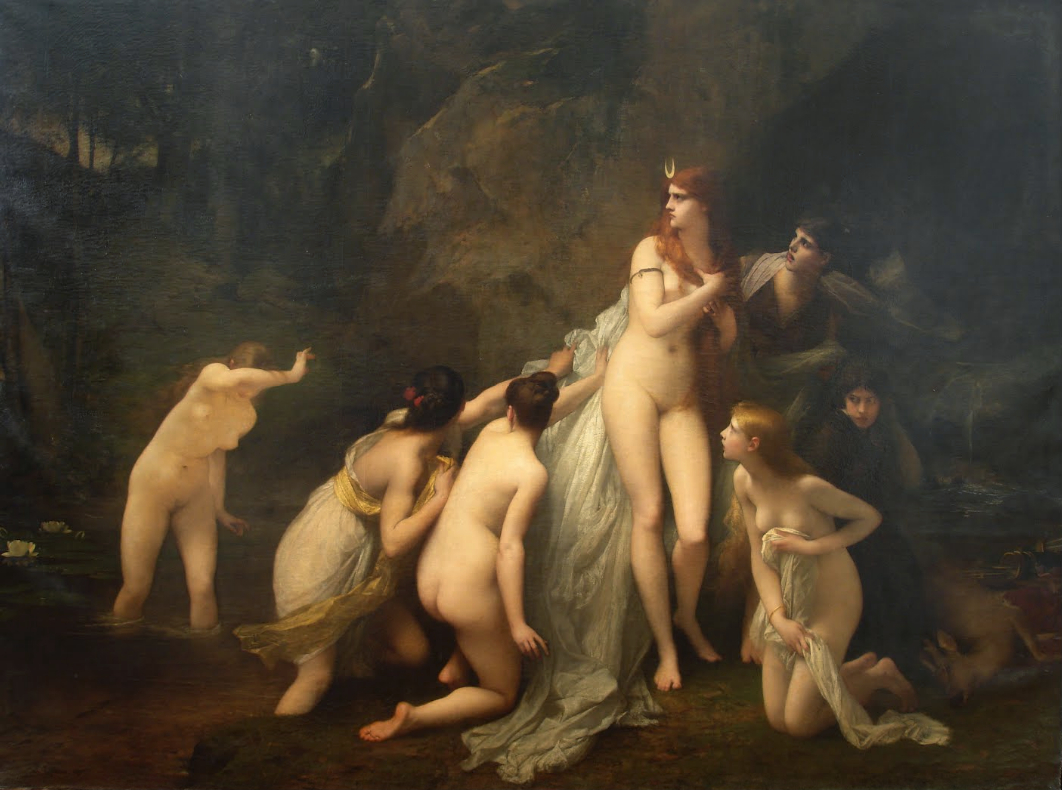
Diana Surprised by Jules Joseph Lefebvre

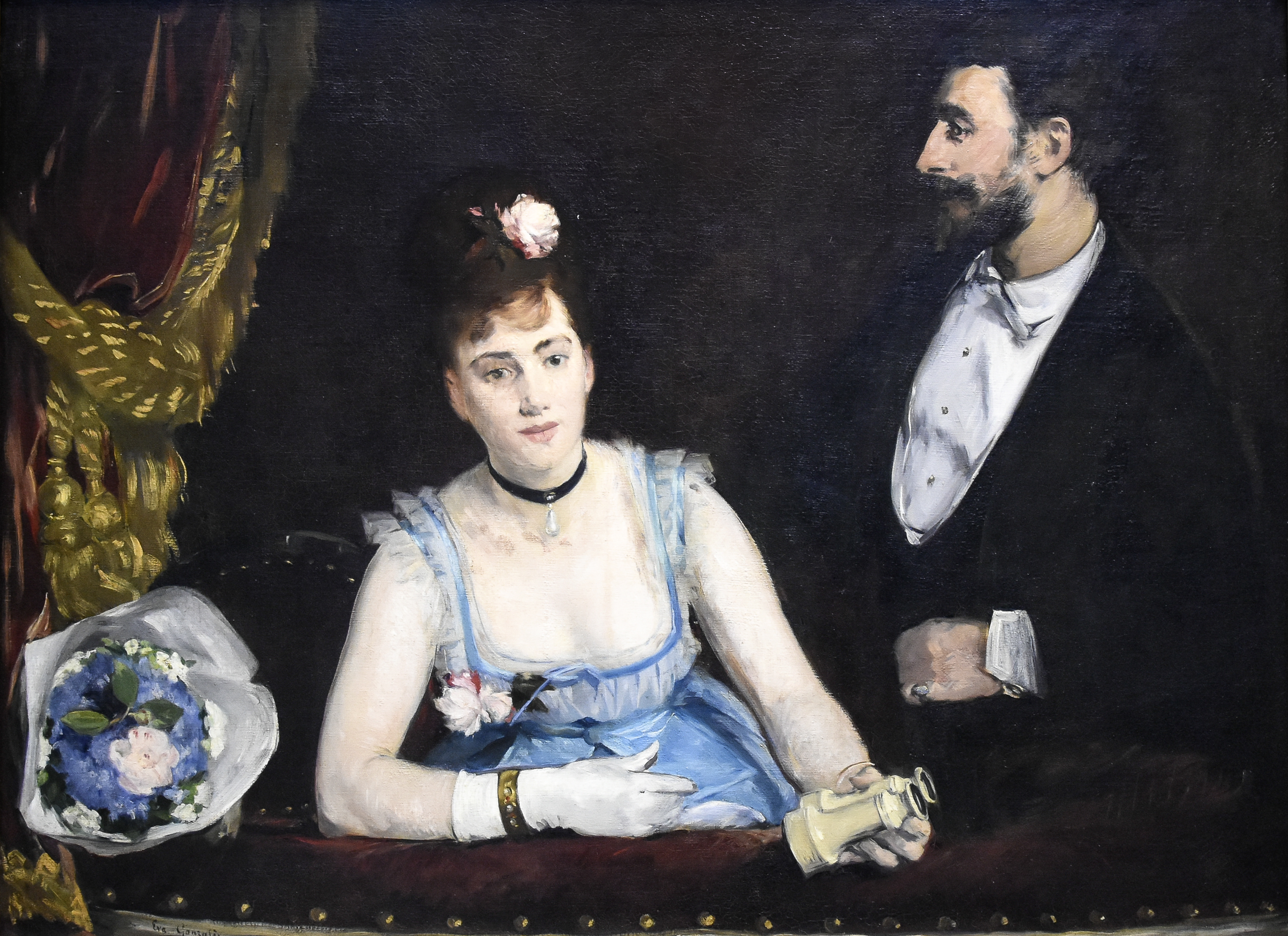
Une loge aux Théâtre Italiens by Eva Gonzalès

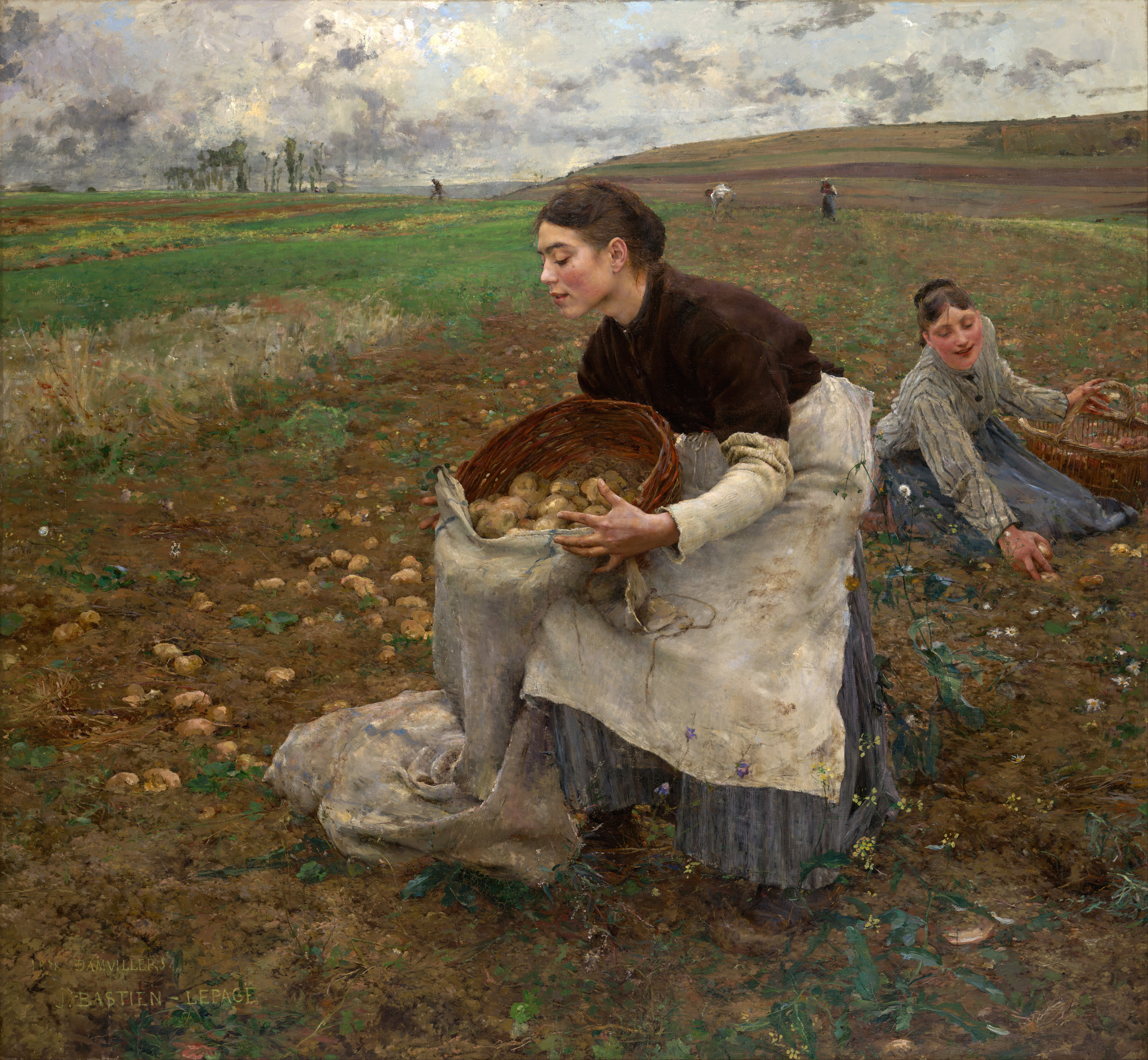
October by Jules Bastien-Lepage

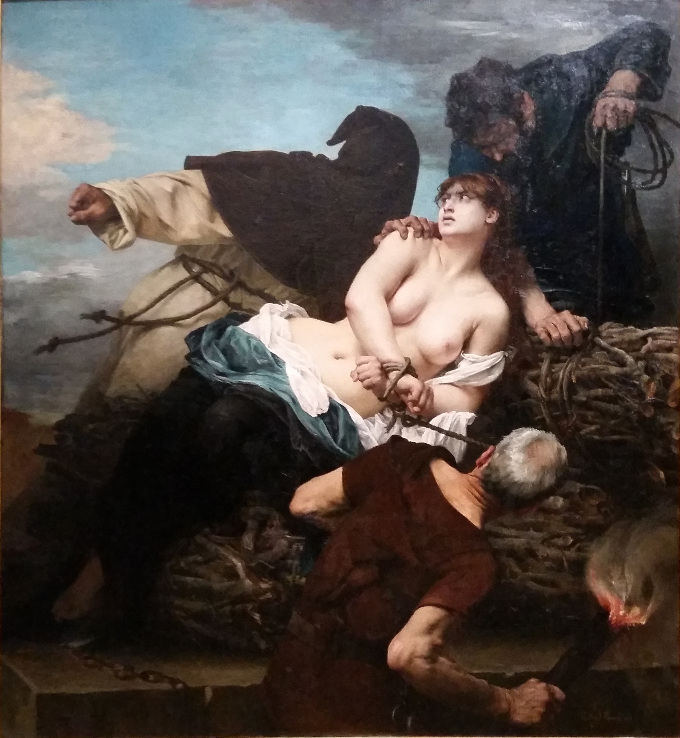
Scenes from the Inquisition in Spain by Gabriel Ferrier

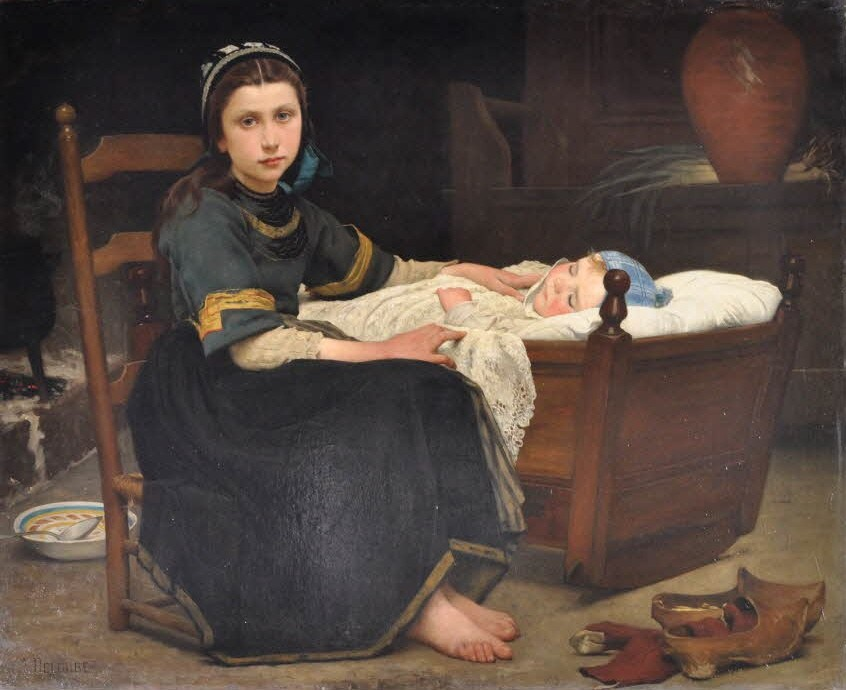
The Older Sister, Souvenir of Brittany by François-Alfred Delobbe

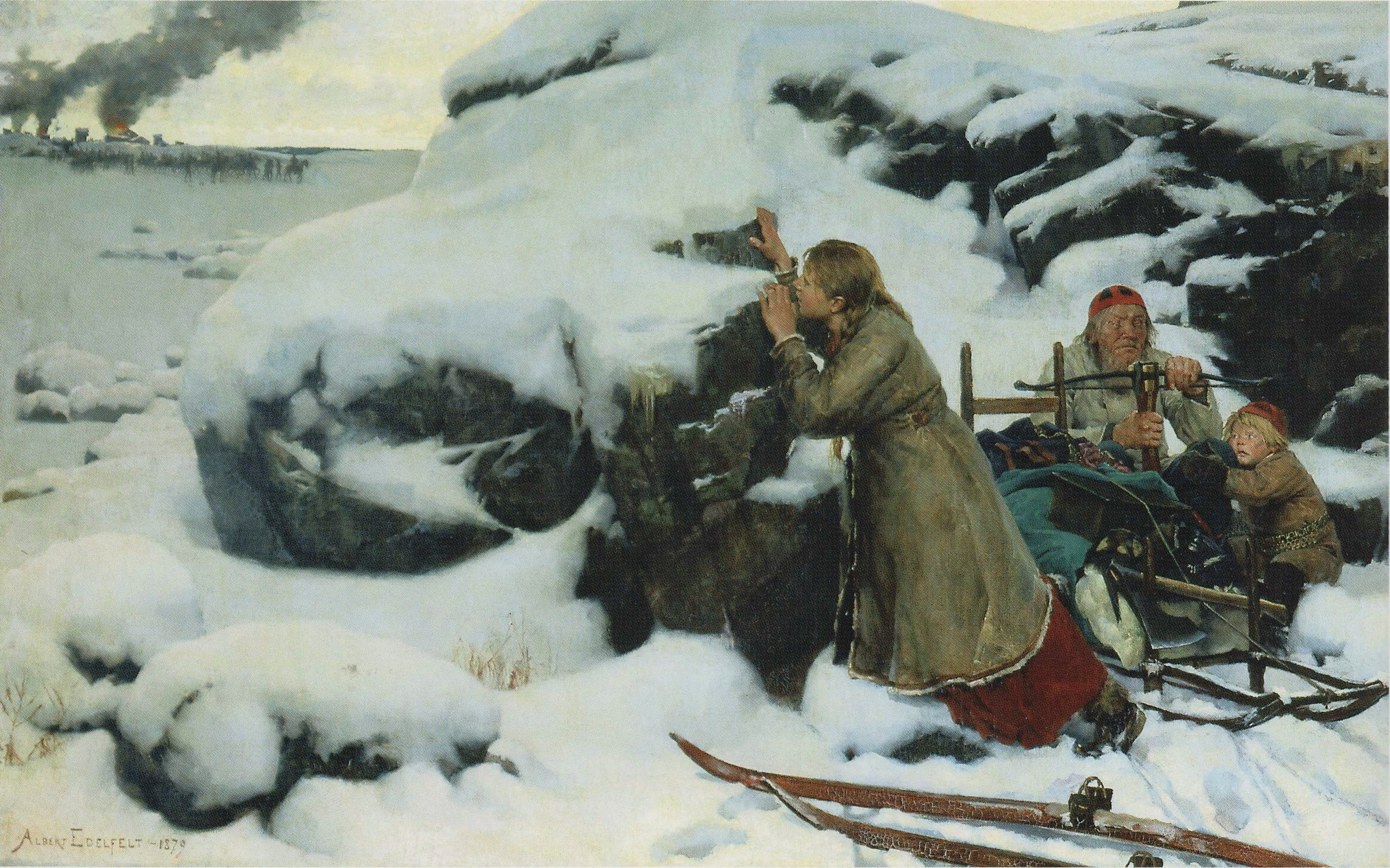
Burnt Village by Albert Edelfelt

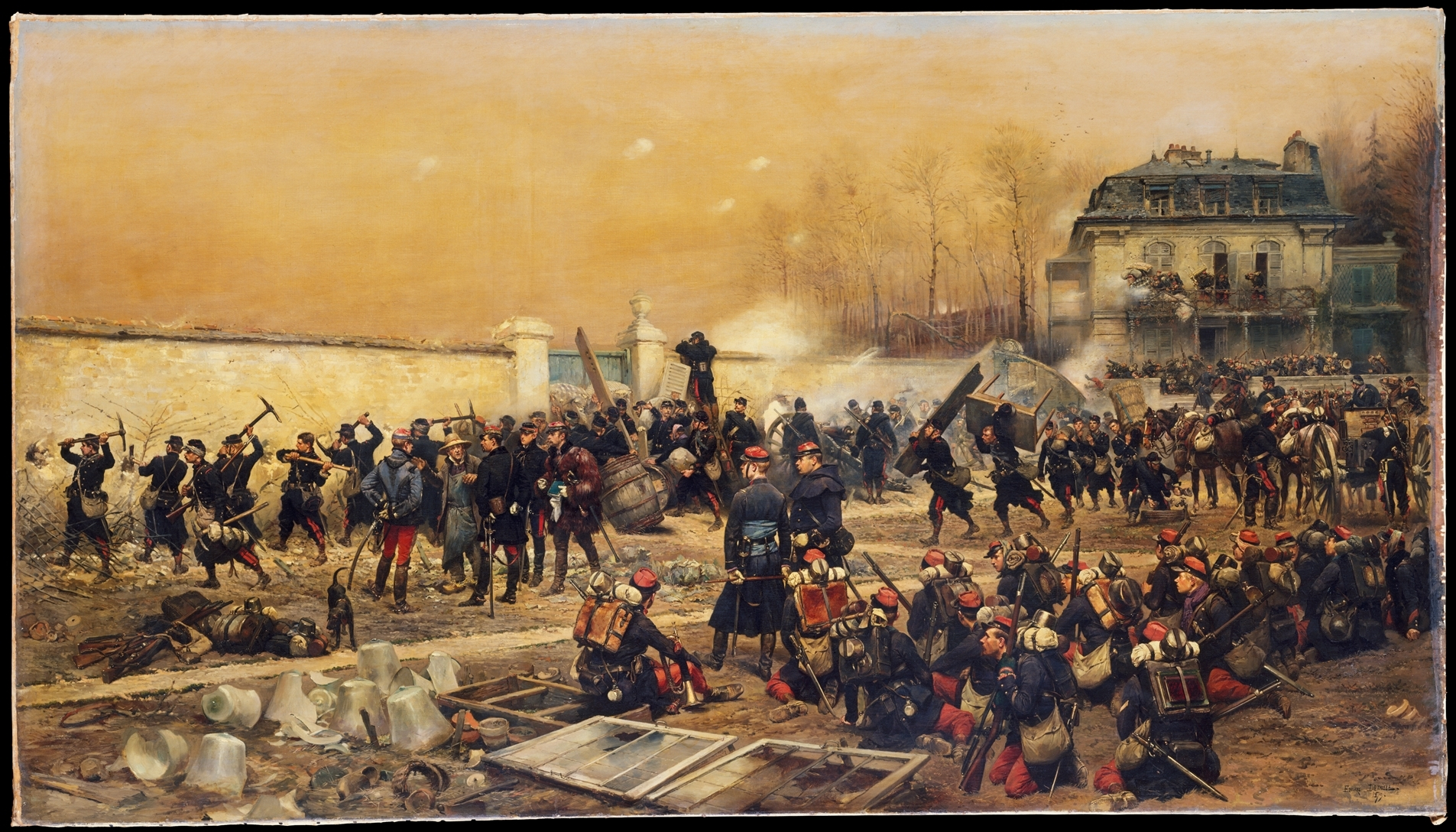
The Defense of Champigny by Édouard Detaille

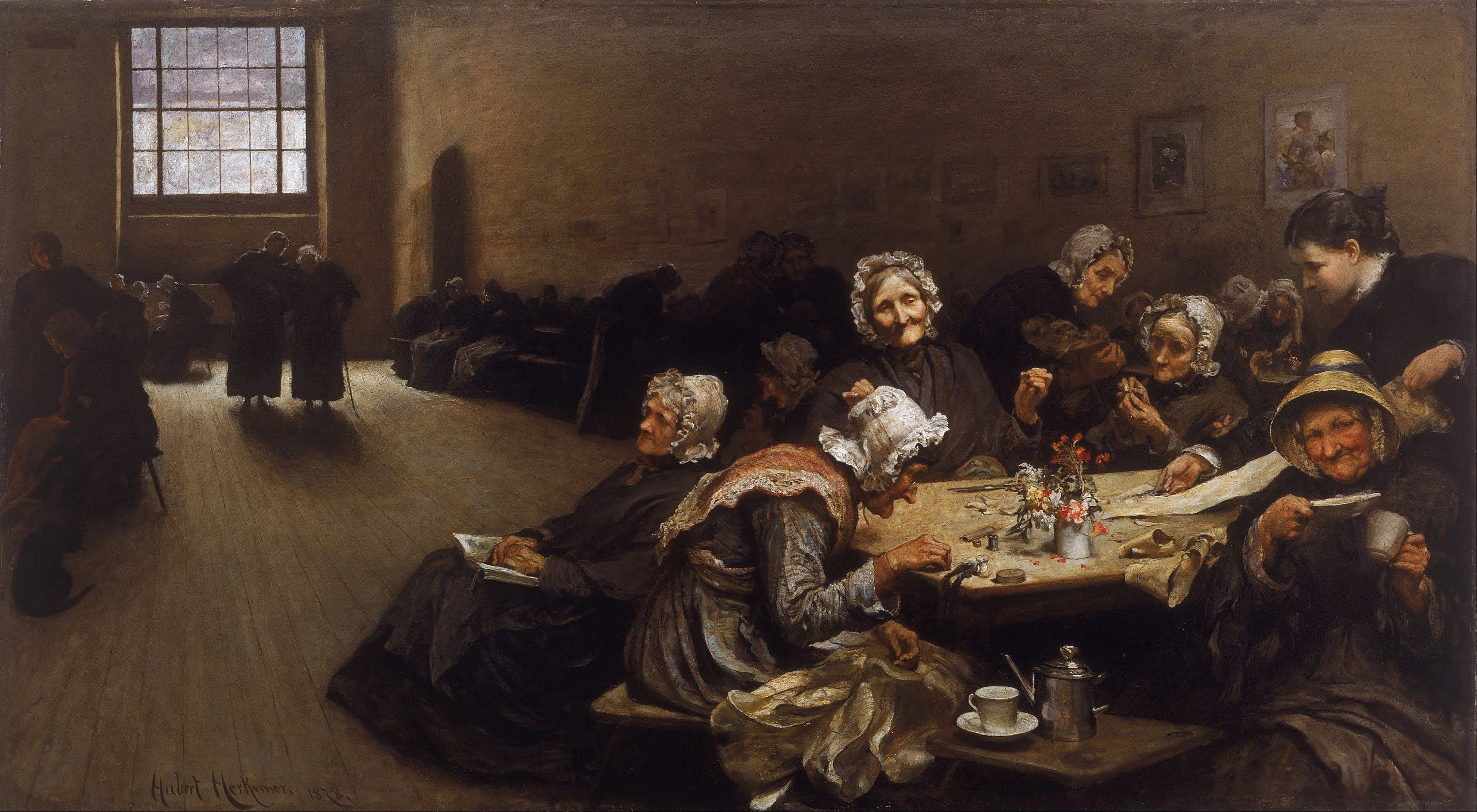
Eventide: A Scene in the Westminster Union by Hubert von Herkomer

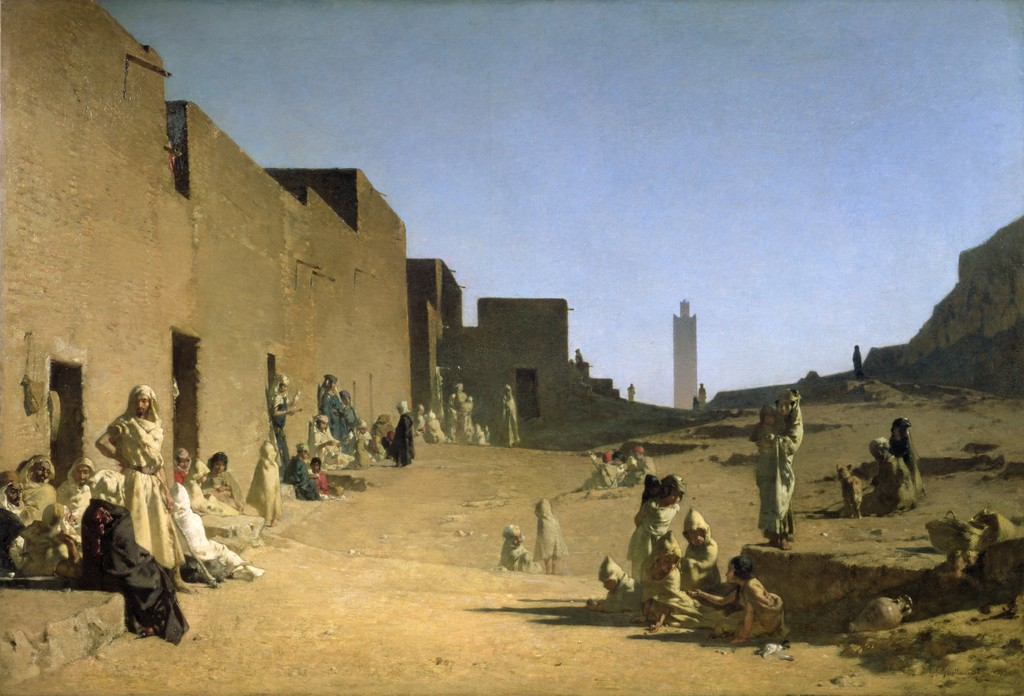
Laghouat in the Algerian Sahara by Gustave Achille Guillaumet

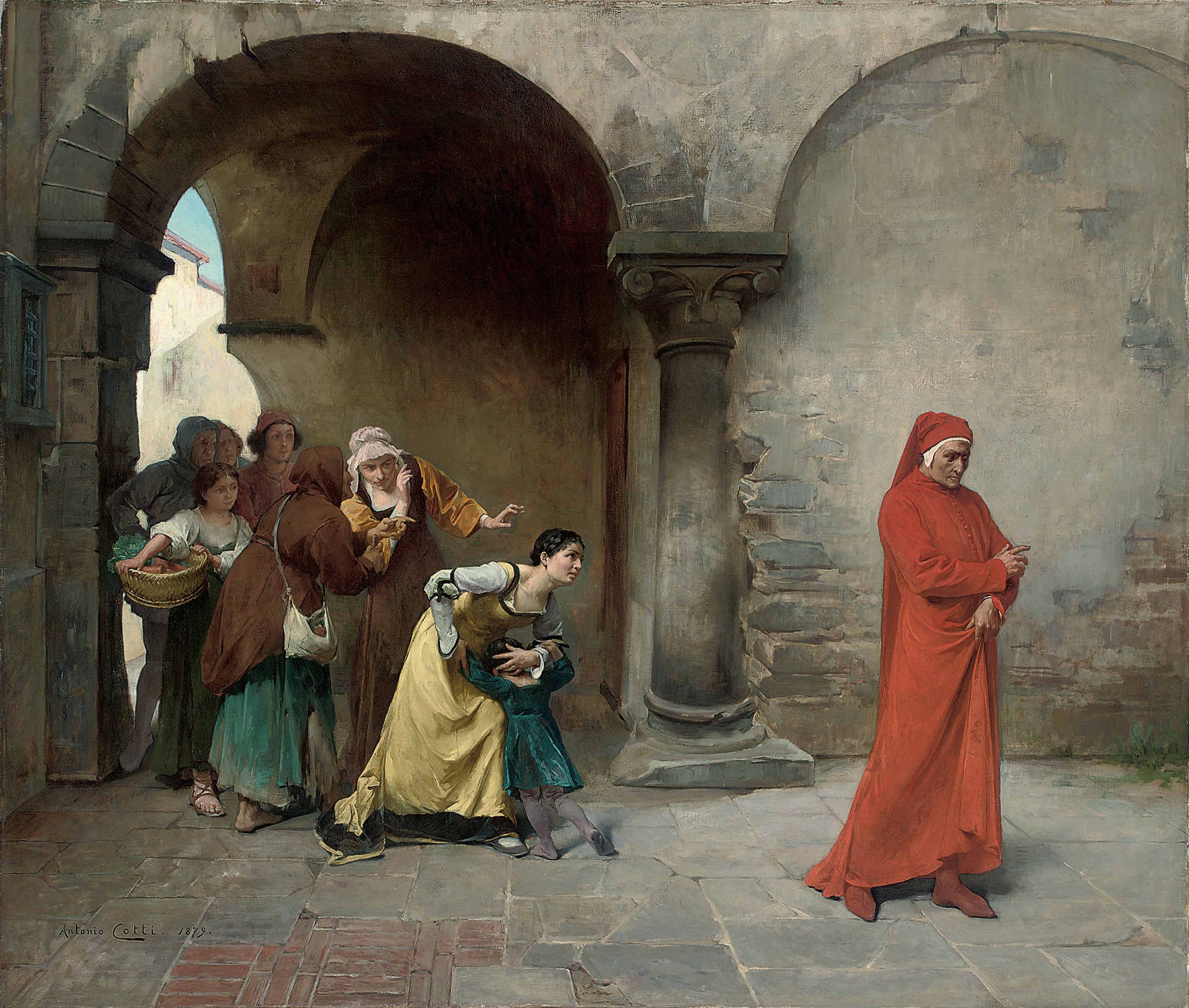
Dante in Verona by Antonio Cotti

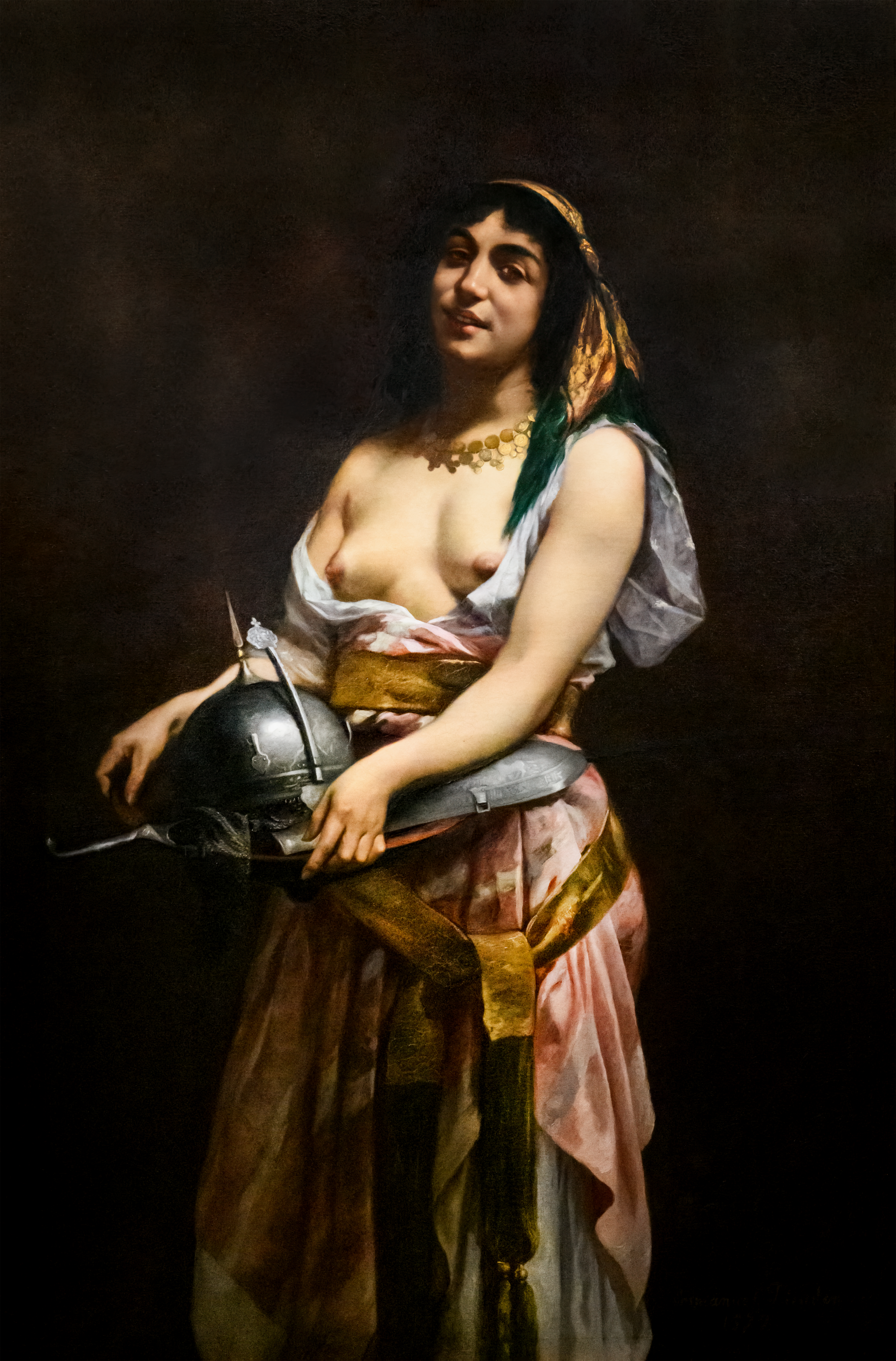
Fatma by Emmanuel de Dieudonné

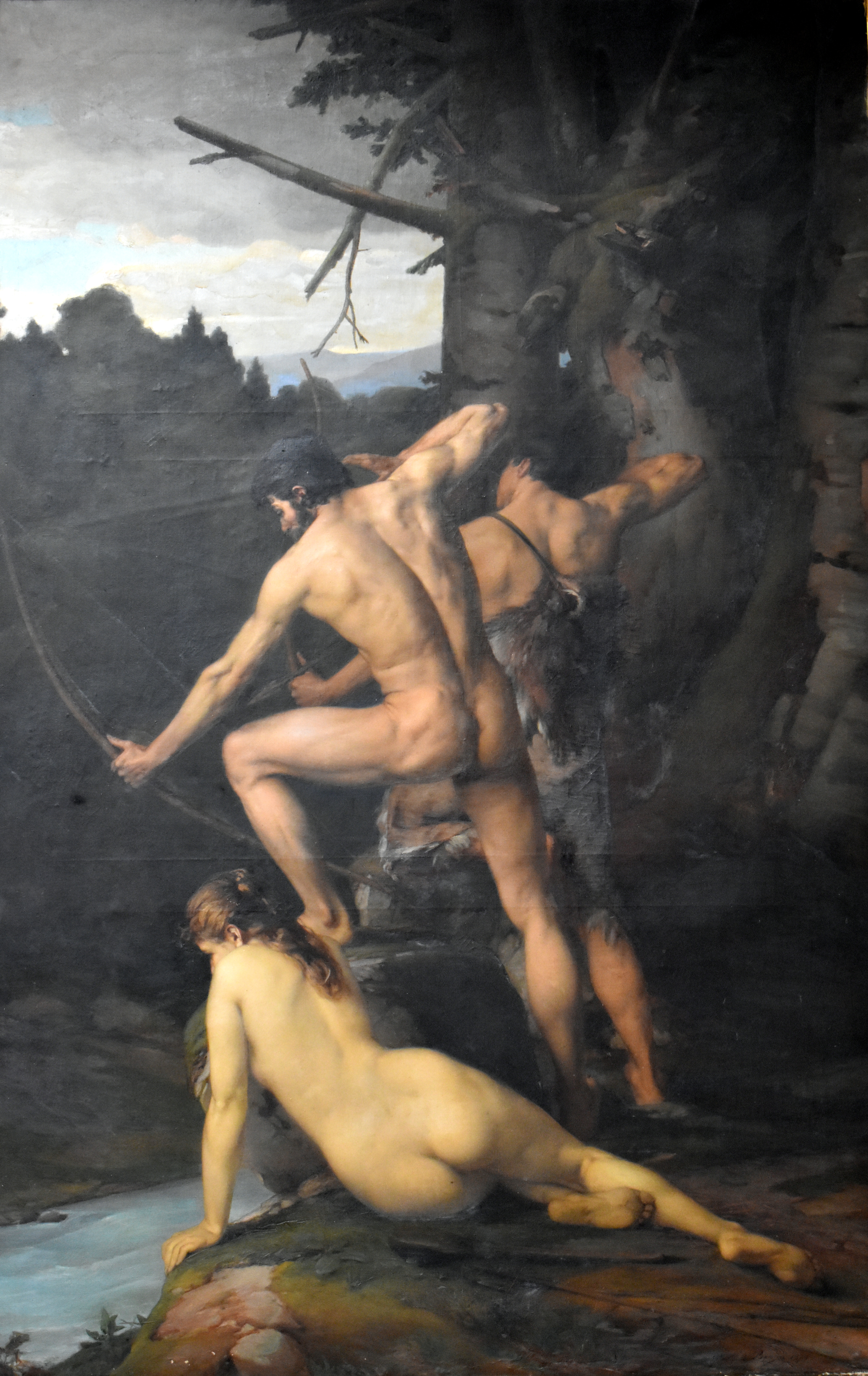
Hunters Lying in Wait by Emmanuel Benner

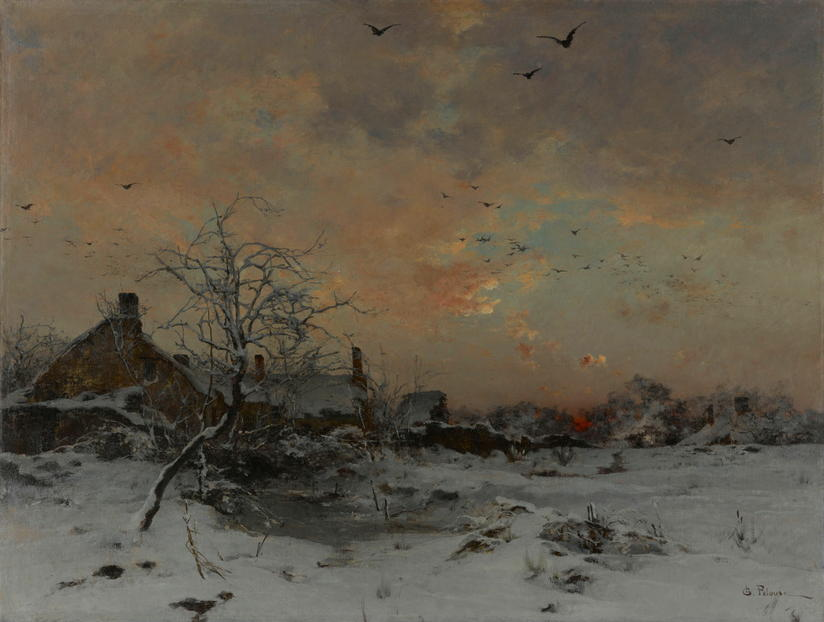
A Corner of Cernay in January by Léon Germain Pelouse

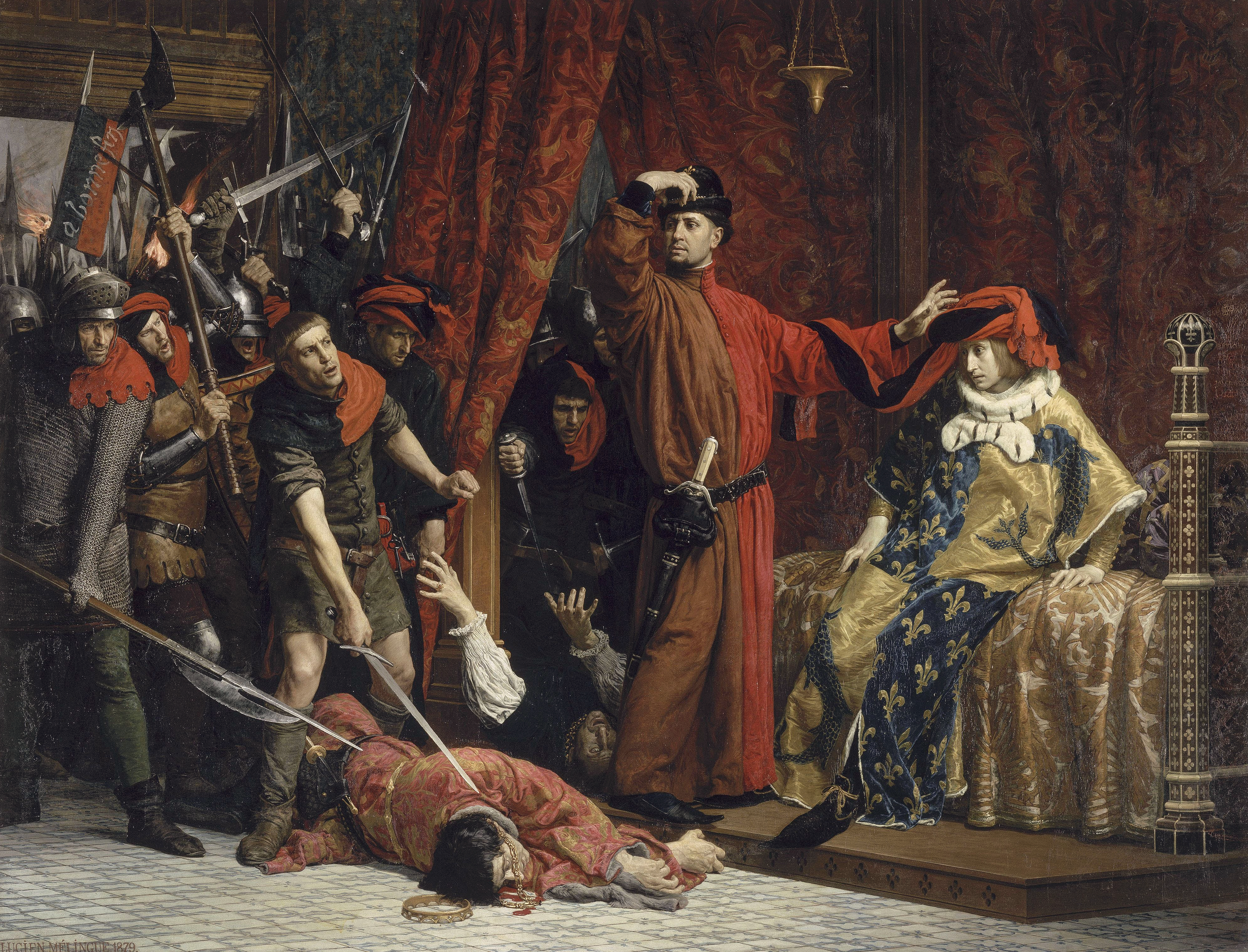
Le Prévôt des marchands Etienne Marcel et le dauphin Charles by Lucien-Étienne Mélingue

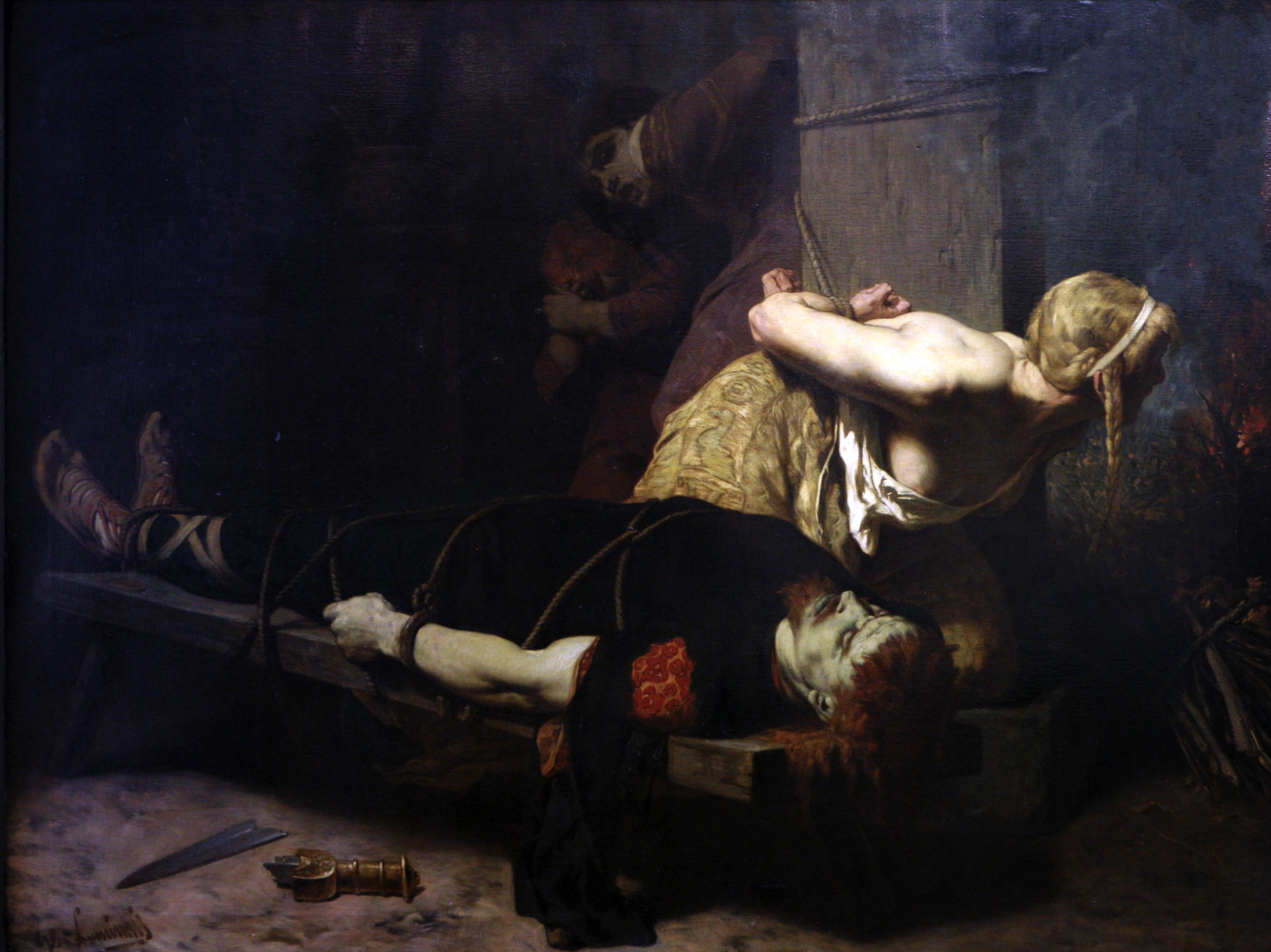
The Death of Chramm by Évariste Vital Luminais

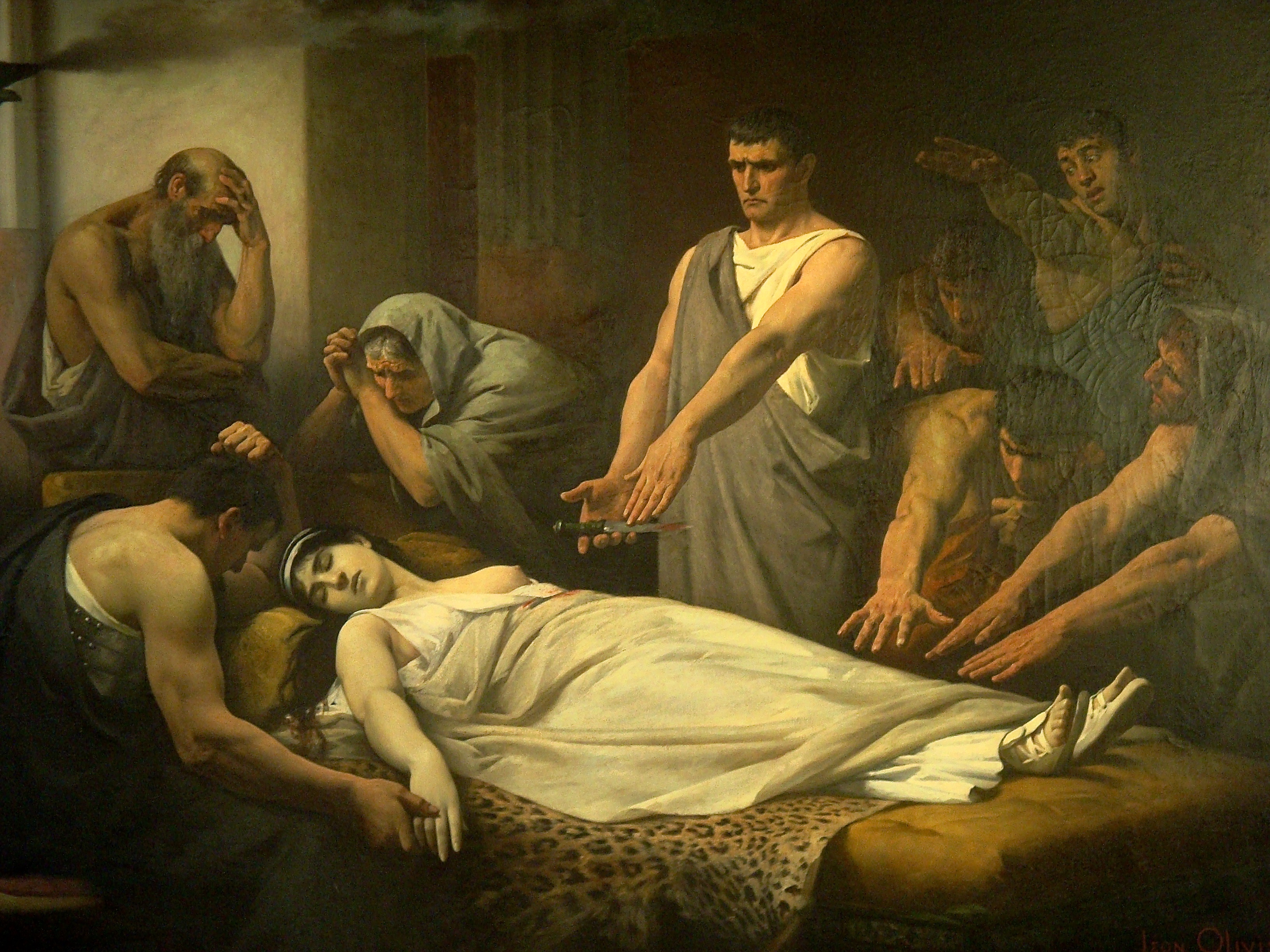
Le serment de Brutus sur le corps de Lucrèce by Léon Olivié

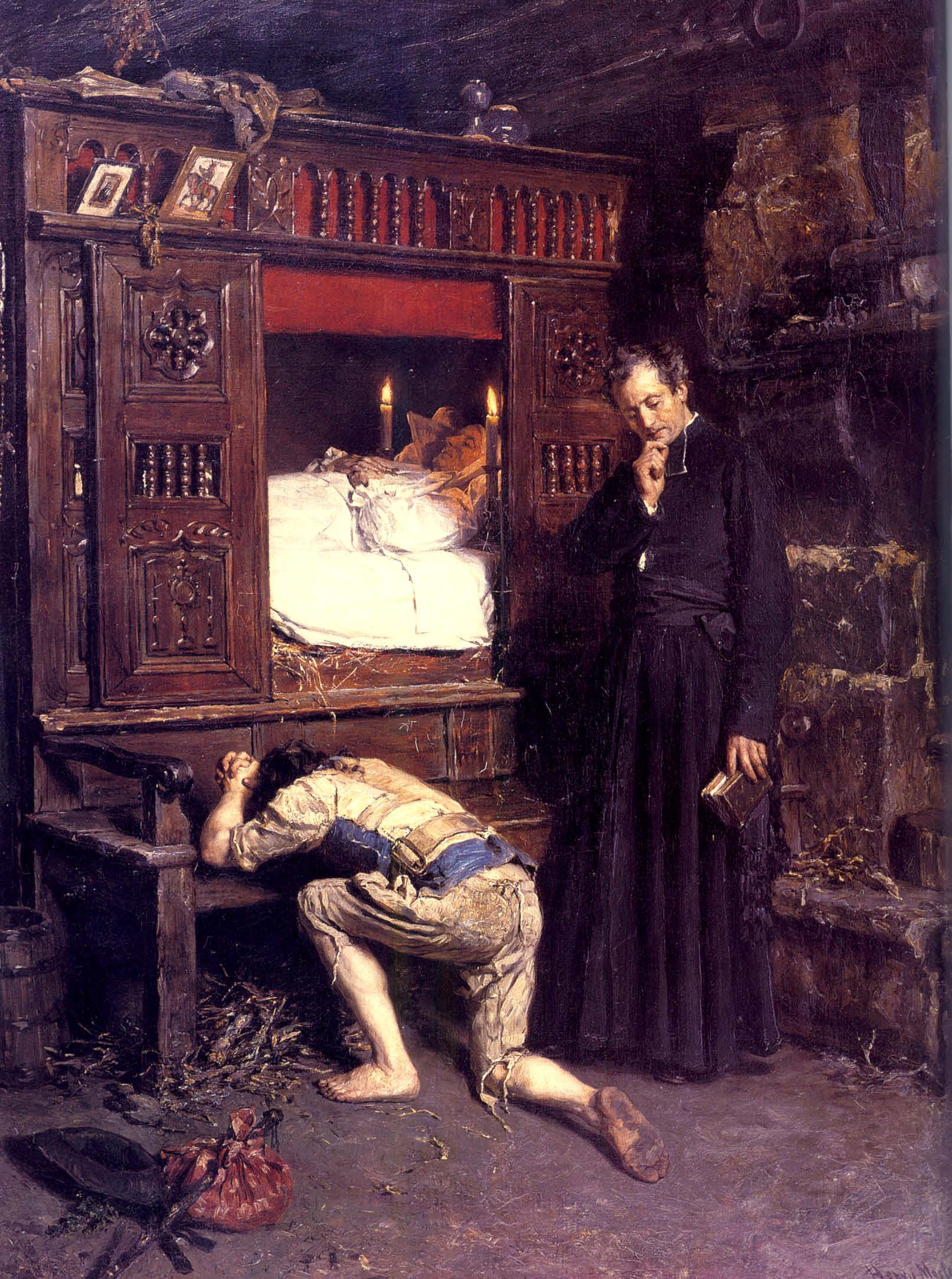
The Return by Henry Mosler

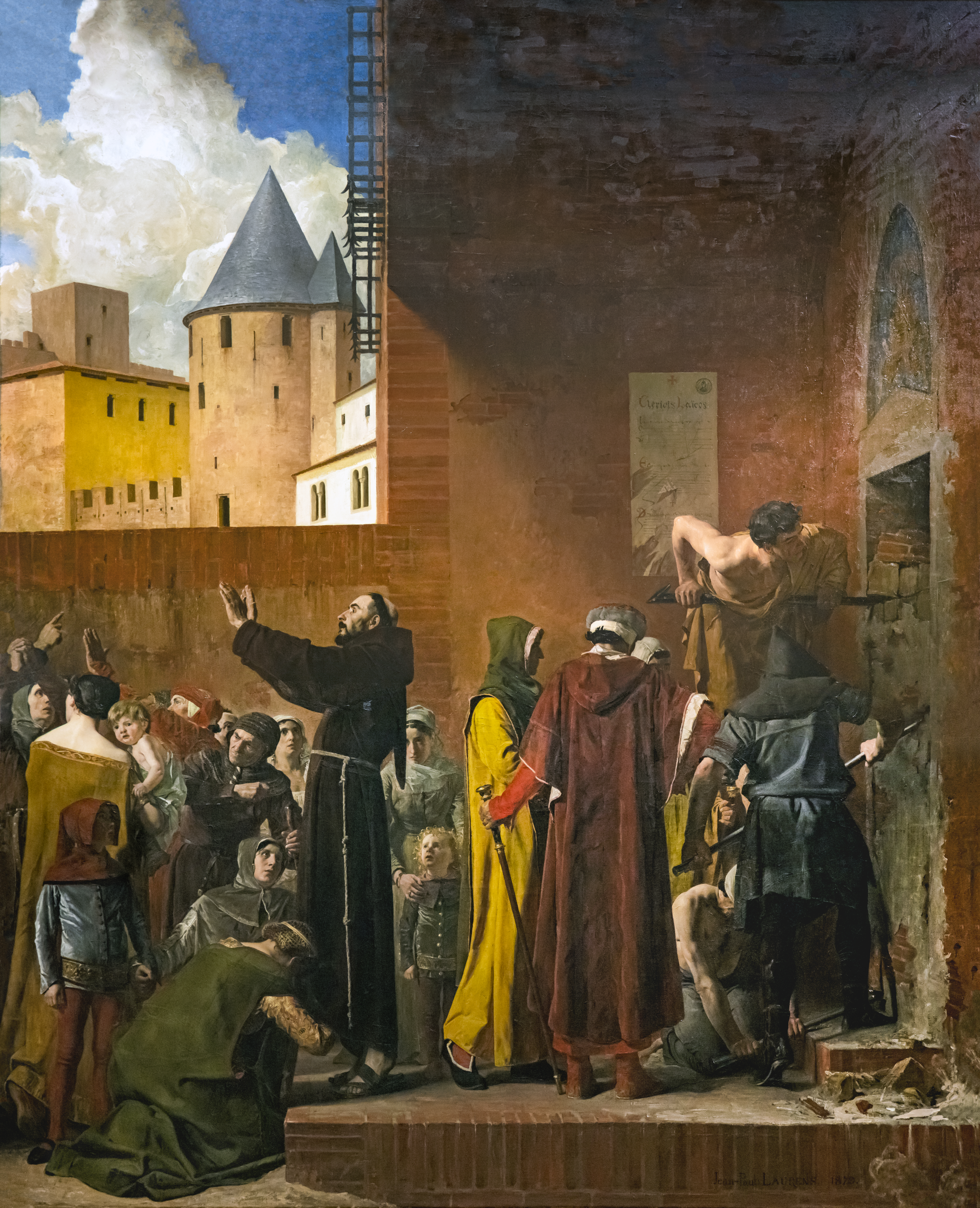
La Délivrance des emmurés de Carcassonne by Jean-Paul Laurens

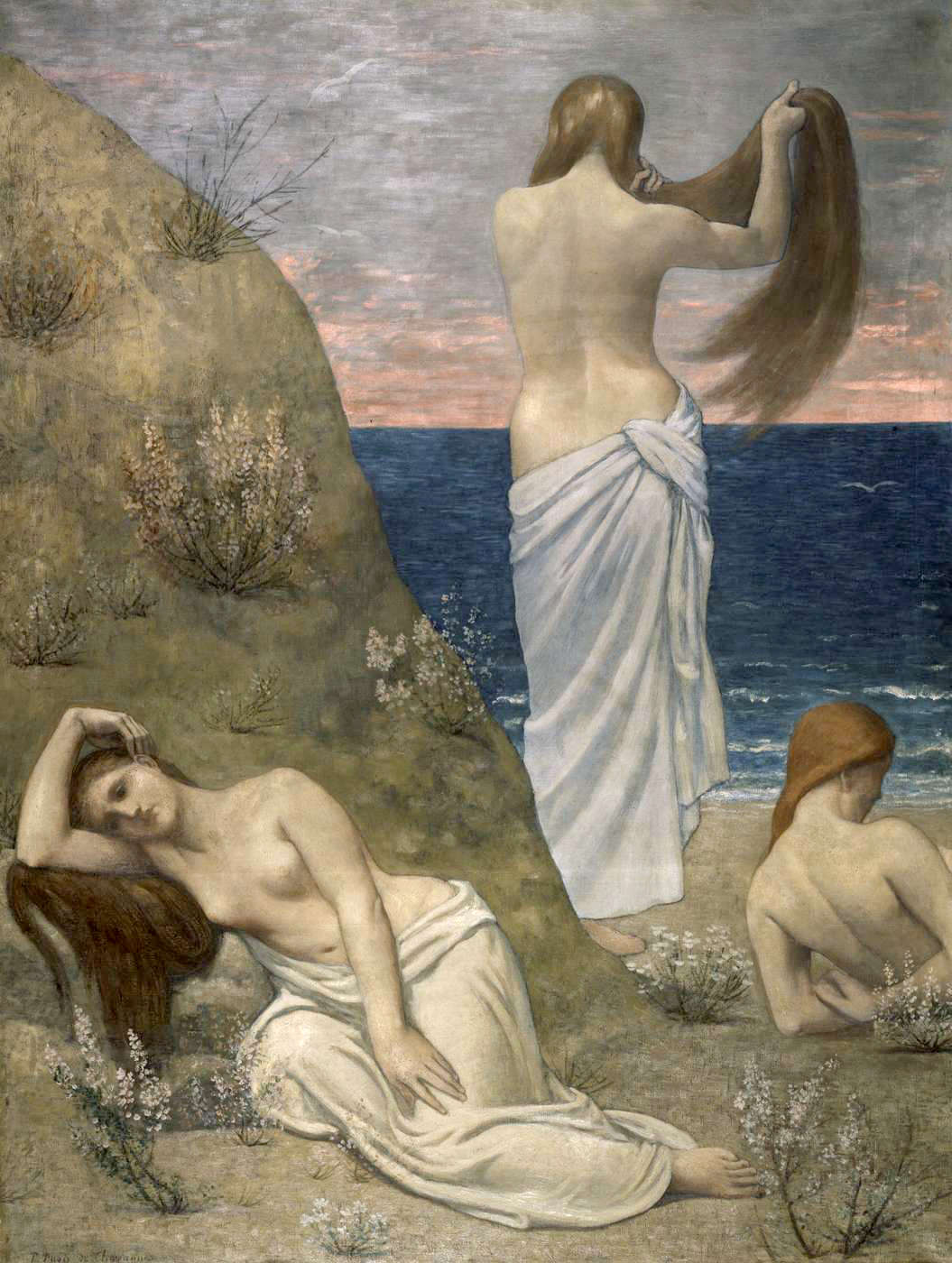
On the Edge of the Sea by Pierre Puvis de Chavannes

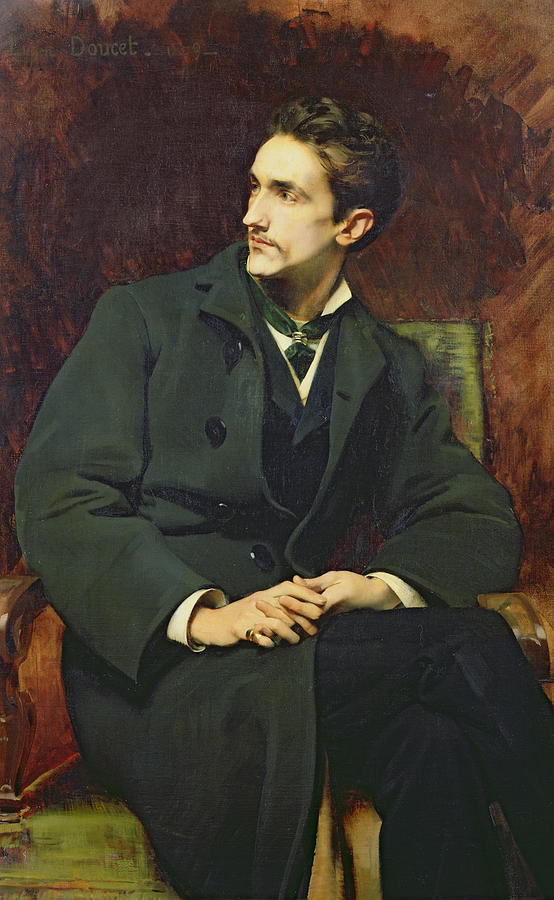
Portrait of Robert de Montesquiou by Henri Lucien Doucet

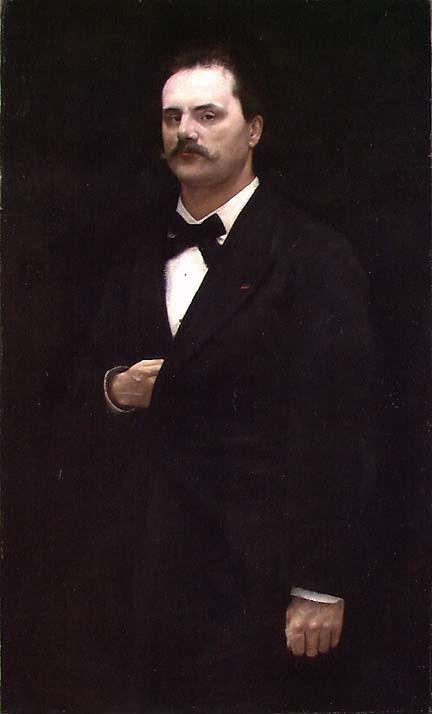
Portrait of Johan Svendsen by Hans Heyerdahl

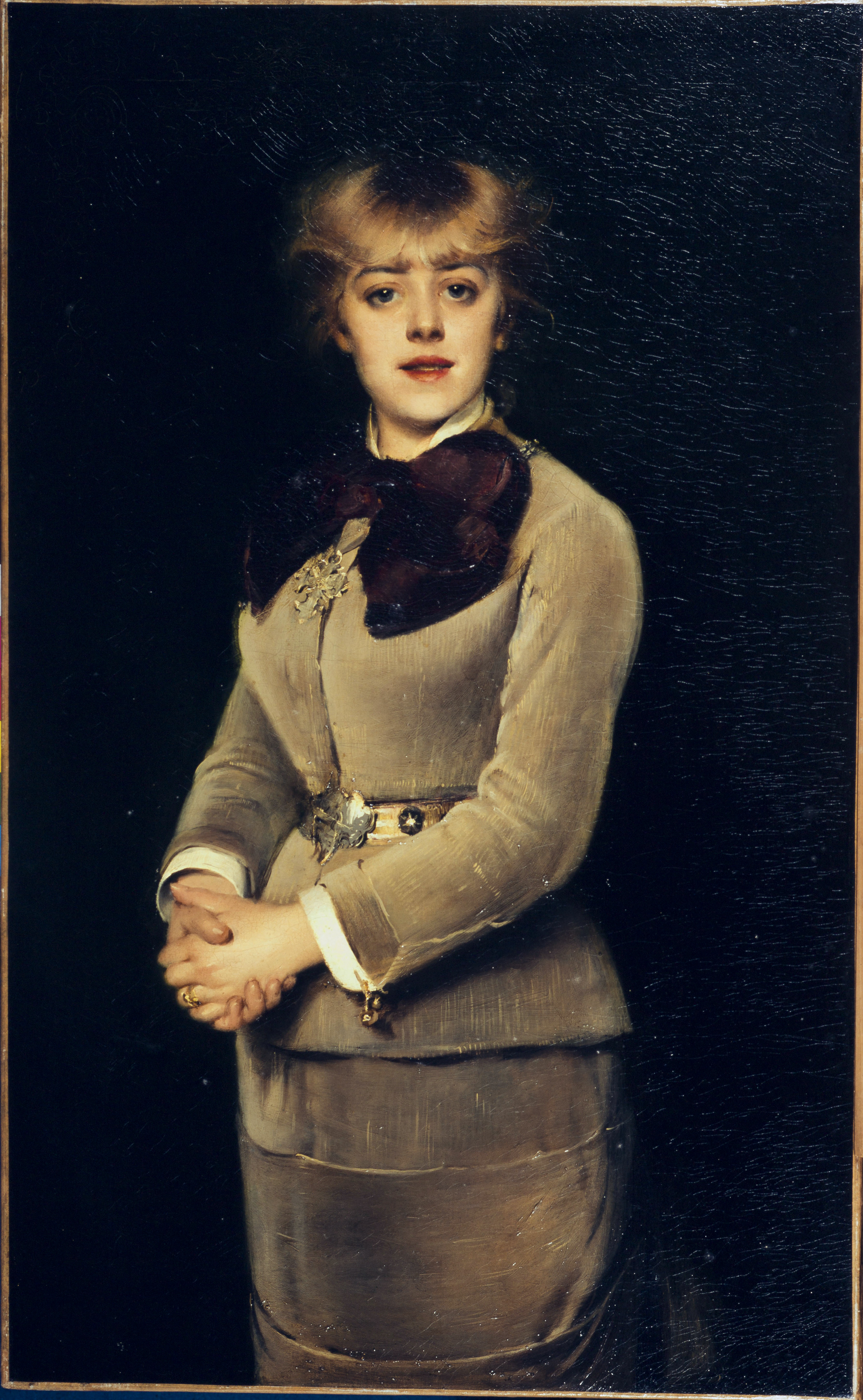
Portrait of Jeanne Samary by Louise Abbéma

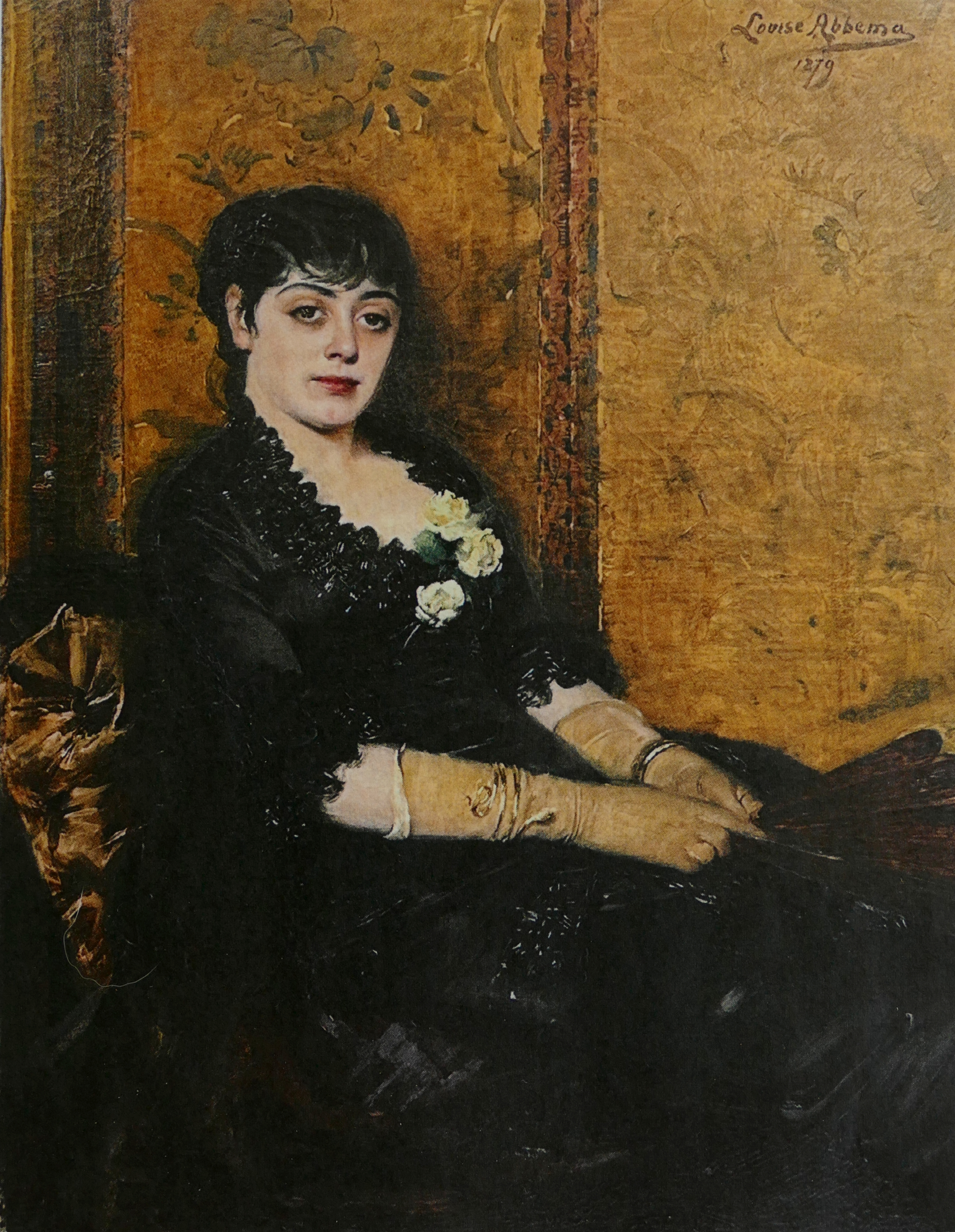
Portrait of Madame X by Louise Abbéma

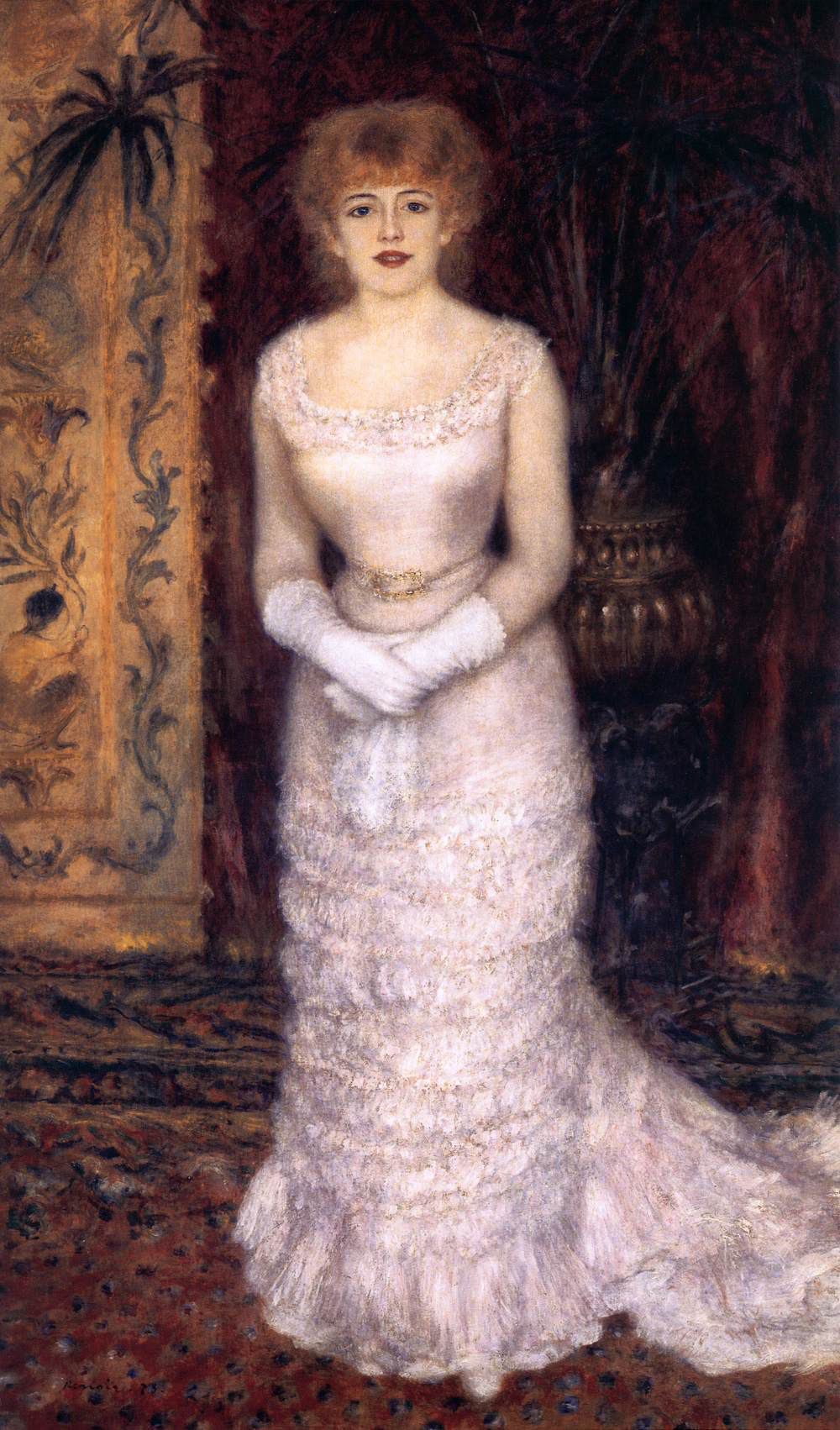
Portrait of Jeanne Samary by Pierre-Auguste Renoir

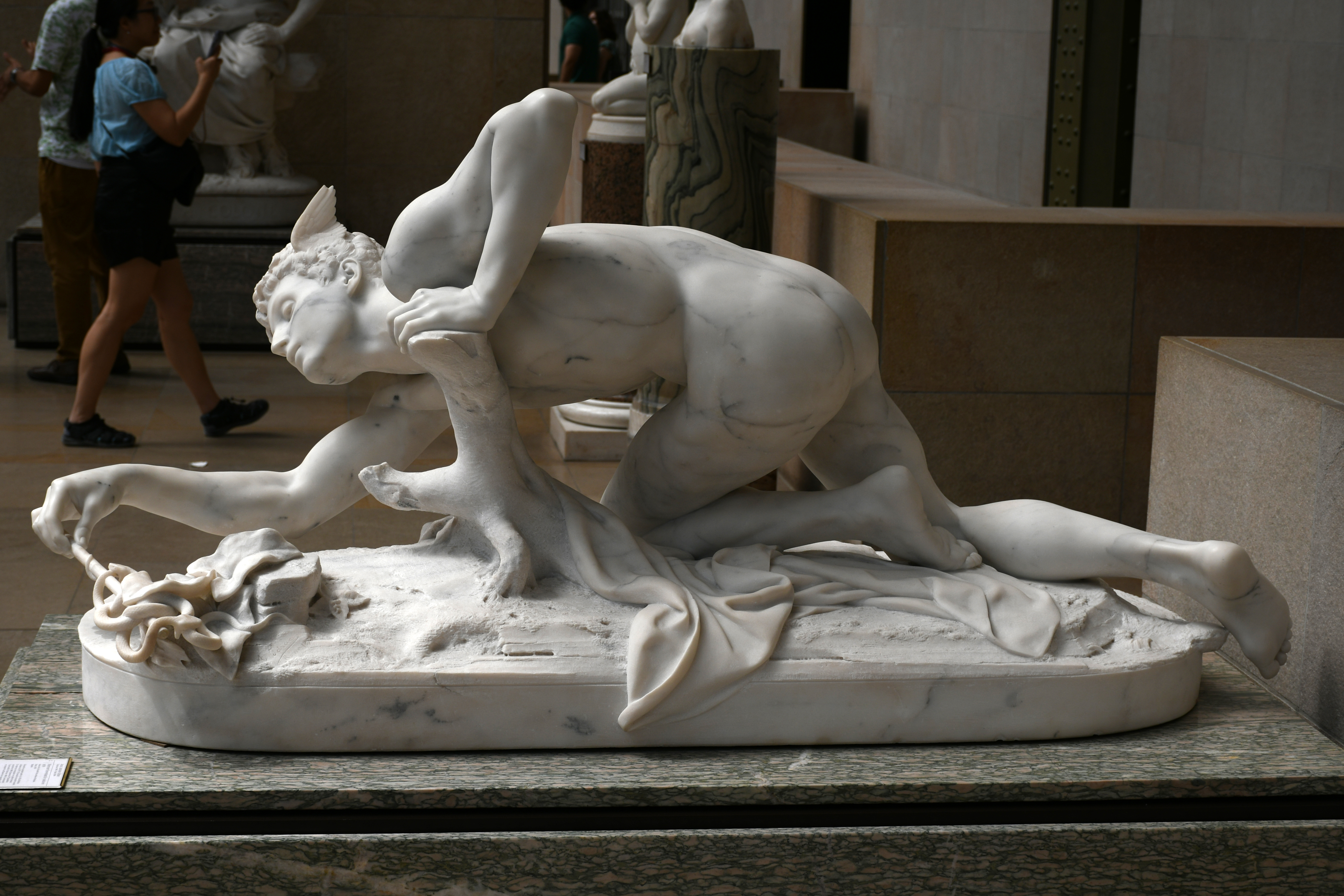
Mercury Inventing the Caduceus by Antonin Idrac

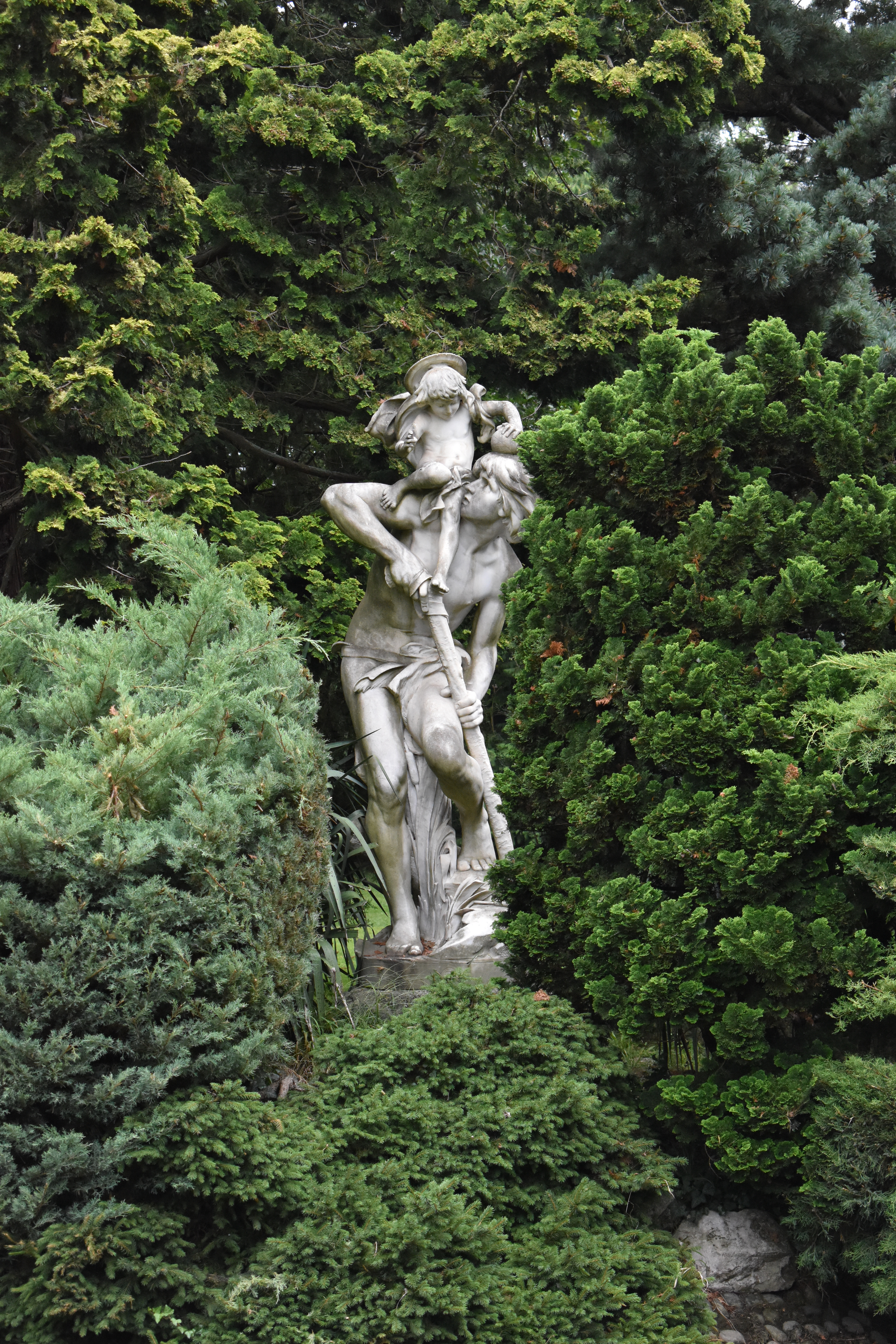
Saint Christopher and the Infant Jesus by Jules Coutan

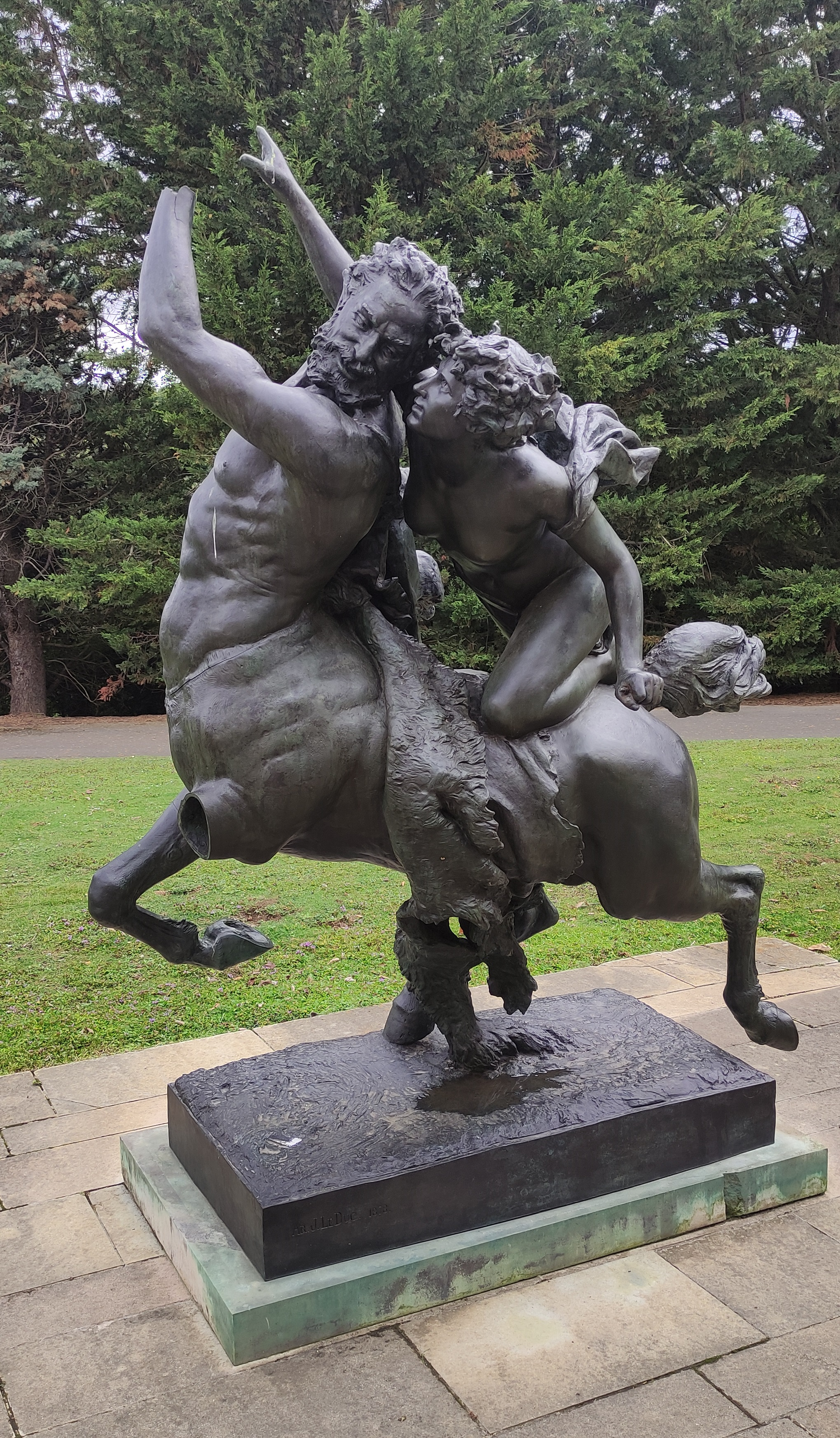
Centaur and Bacchante by Arthur Le Duc

== See also ==
- Royal Academy Exhibition of 1879, held at Burlington House in London

== Bibliography ==
- Allard, Sébastien, Loyrette, Henri & Des Cars, Laurence. Nineteenth Century French Art: From Romanticism to Impressionism, Post-Impressionism and Art Nouveau. Rizzoli International Publications, 2007.
- Brauer, Fae. Rivals and Conspirators: The Paris Salons and the Modern Art Centre. Cambridge Scholars Publishing, 2014.
- Harris, Nathaniel & Forsythe, James. The Art of Manet. Gallery Books, 1989.
