= Portrait of Victor Hugo =

Painting by Léon Bonnat

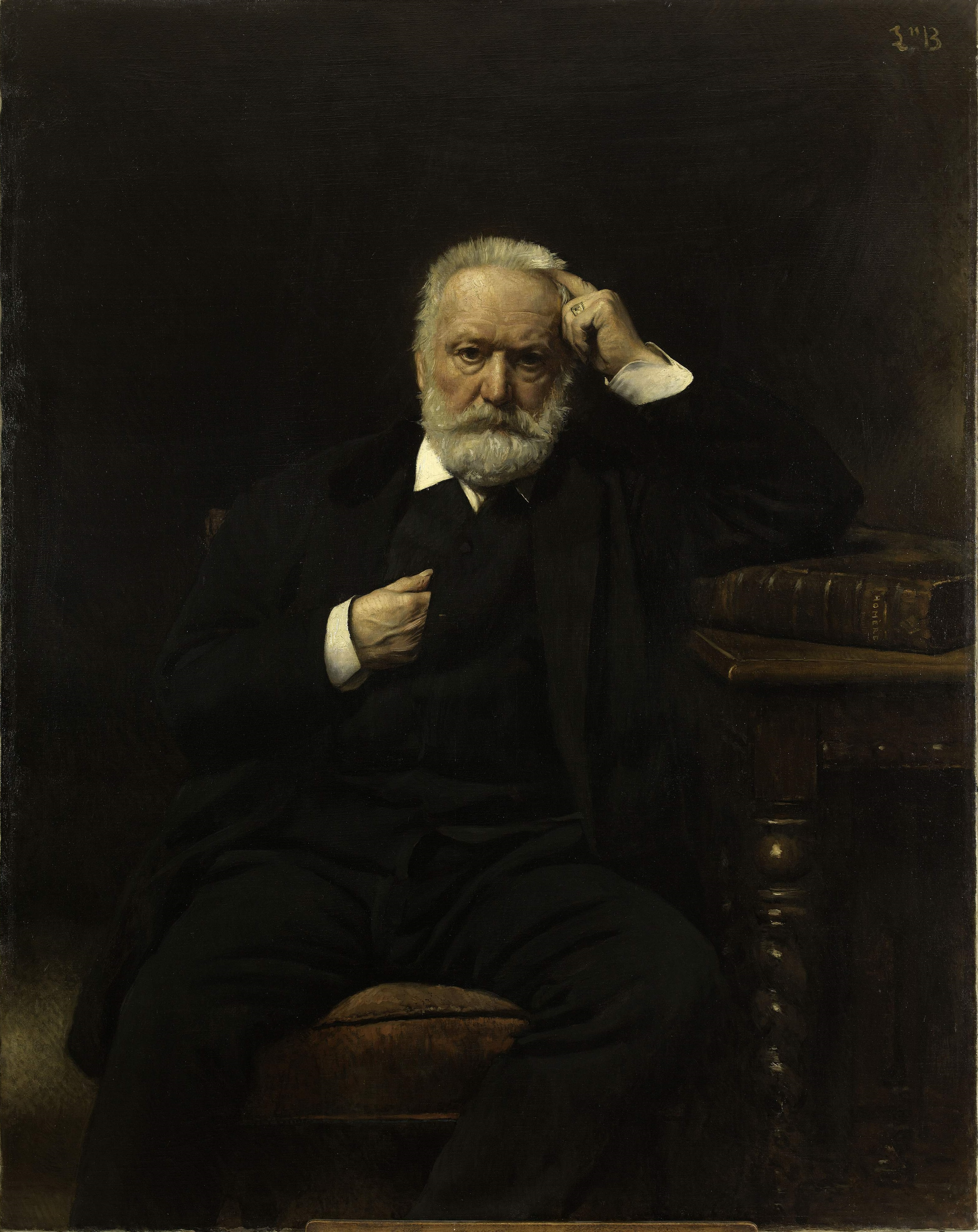
- Artist: Léon Bonnat
- Year: 1879
- Type: Oil on canvas, portrait painting
- Dimensions: 137 cm × 109 cm (54 in × 43 in)
- Location: Palace of Versailles; Versailles

Portrait of Victor Hugo is an 1879 portrait painting by the French artist Léon Bonnat of the veteran writer Victor Hugo. A key figure in the Romantic movement Hugo was known for many works including his 1831 novel The Hunchback of Notre-Dame and his 1862 epic novel Les Misérables. By the time the painting was produced Hugo was seventy seven and a legendary figure in French literature. Bonnat was known for his portraits of leading figures of French society and had enjoyed success with his 1876 Portrait of Adolphe Thiers.

The picture was displayed at the Salon of 1879 held at the Palace of Industry in Paris. The work is now in the collection of the Palace of Versailles, having been donated to the French state by the sitter's granddaughter Jeanne Hugo in 1919.

== Bibliography ==
- Lehmann, Mette H. & Lobstein, Dominique. Krøyer and Paris: French Connections and Nordic Colours. Aarhus University Press, 2022.
- Marrinan, Michael. Gustave Caillebotte: Painting the Paris of Naturalism, 1872-1887. Getty Research Institute, 2016.
