= Portrait of Sarah Bernhardt =

1879 painting by Jules Bastien-Lepage

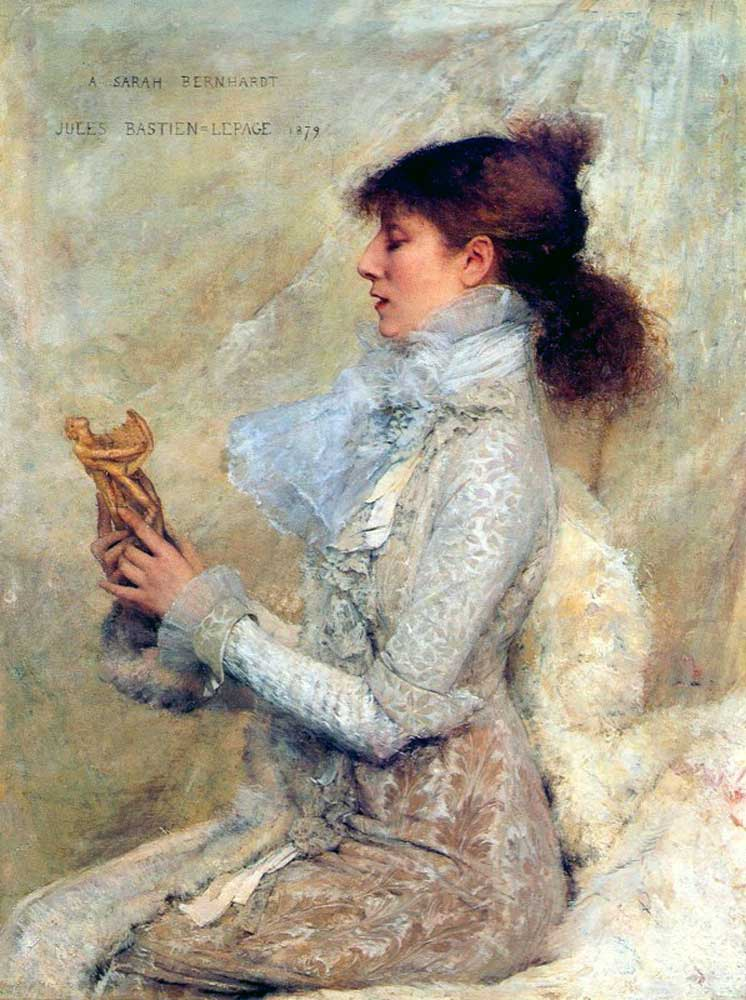
- Artist: Jules Bastien-Lepage
- Year: 1879
- Medium: Oil on canvas
- Dimensions: 43.5 x 34.6 cm
- Location: Private collection

Portrait of Sarah Bernhardt is an oil on canvas painting by French painter Jules Bastien-Lepage, from 1879. It portrays the famous actress Sarah Bernhardt, who had a mutual admiration for Bastien-Lepage.

In 2022, sold from the collection of Gordon Getty, it sold for $2,280,000 at Christie's New York, on 20 October 2022. This was a record auction price for a Bastien-Lepage painting.

== History and description ==
Bernhardt was an admirer of Bastien-Lepage, at least since his painting l'Annonciation aux Bergers had narrowly lost the Prix de Rome in 1875. When the two met personally, probably in 1878, Bastien-Lepage already had the intention of inviting her to sit for a portrait. At the time, Bernhardt told him about how she put a bouquet of flowers in front of the painting as a sort of tribute. When asked if he remembered the bouquet, Bastien-Lepage answered that he had kept it with him since then.

The sessions where Bernhardt sat for the portrait seem to have been many and tiring, despite its small format; a source claims they were actually forty-five. Bastien-Lepage decided to portray Bernhardt seated, in profile, looking away from the viewer and into a statuette of Orpheus that she holds with both hands. She is dressed very elegantly, in accordance with the fashion of the time, in a dress with silk brocades, and wearing a flamboyant chiffon. Her clothing is very white-blueish, while the background matches the clarity of her outfit and of her seat. It was Bastien-Lepage who suggested she hold the small sculpture of Orpheus, which she seems to be watching carefully, perhaps as a tribute to her ambitions in sculpture. According to the Christie's website: "Orpheus thus embodies the ars longa that Bernhardt hoped to achieve in her sculpture and that was merely ephemeral in her stage appearances. Nevertheless, by 1879, these very performances, and the gossip they engendered, were at the root of her notoriety."

== Reception ==
The picture was displayed at the Salon of 1879 in Paris and again at the Royal Academy Exhibition of 1880 in London, where it hung with another work by Bastien-Lepage featuring the future Edward VII. The painting, when exhibited for the first time, divided critics, but most appreciations were positive. Art critic Jules-Antoine Castagnary, a supporter of realism, had the highest praise for the painting, calling it "an extraordinary work", who might be remembered one hundred years from then as a masterpiece.
