= Cygnaeus Gallery =

Art gallery in Helsinki, Finland

Coordinates: 60°09′33″N 24°57′33″E

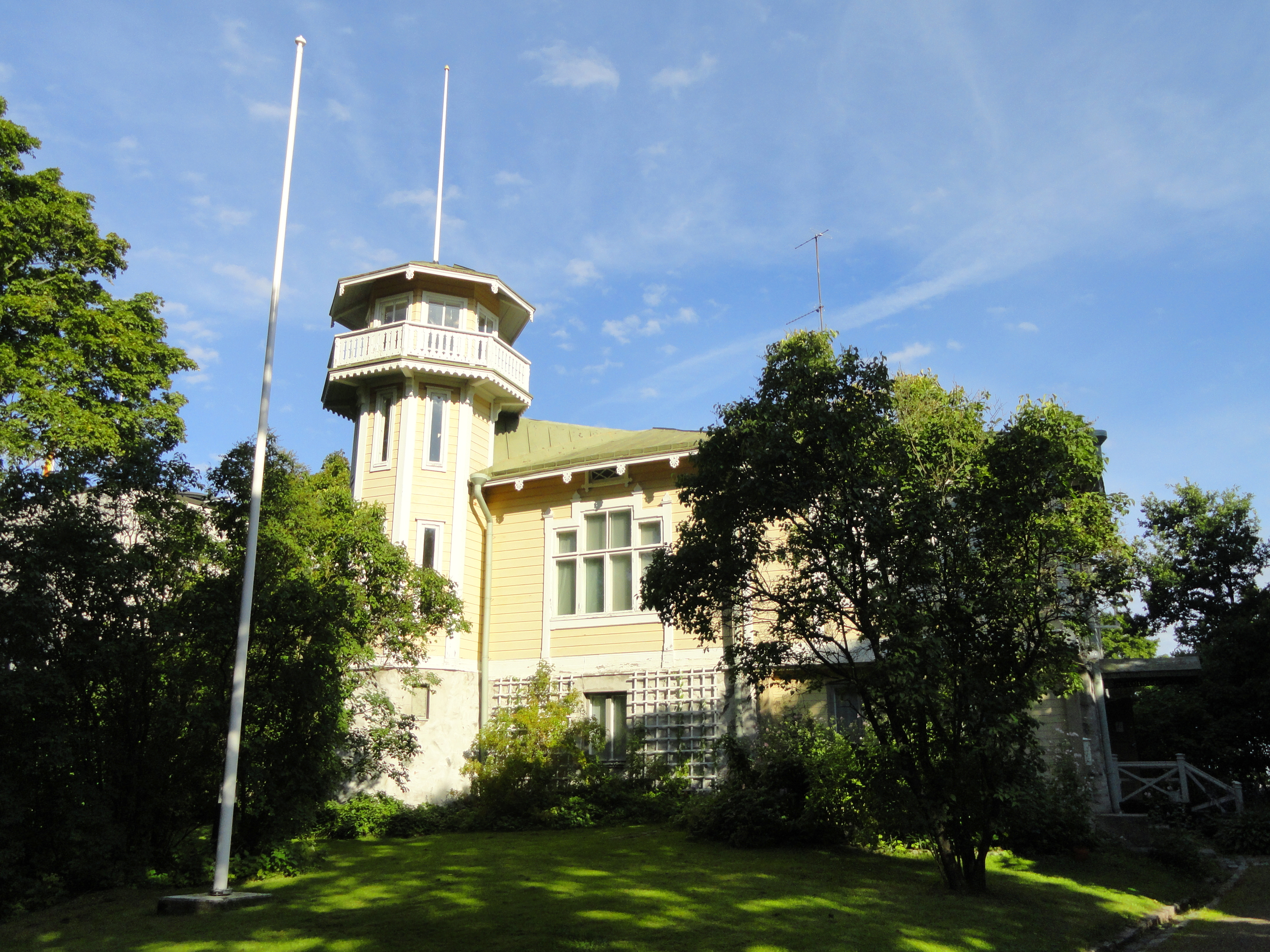
Exterior view

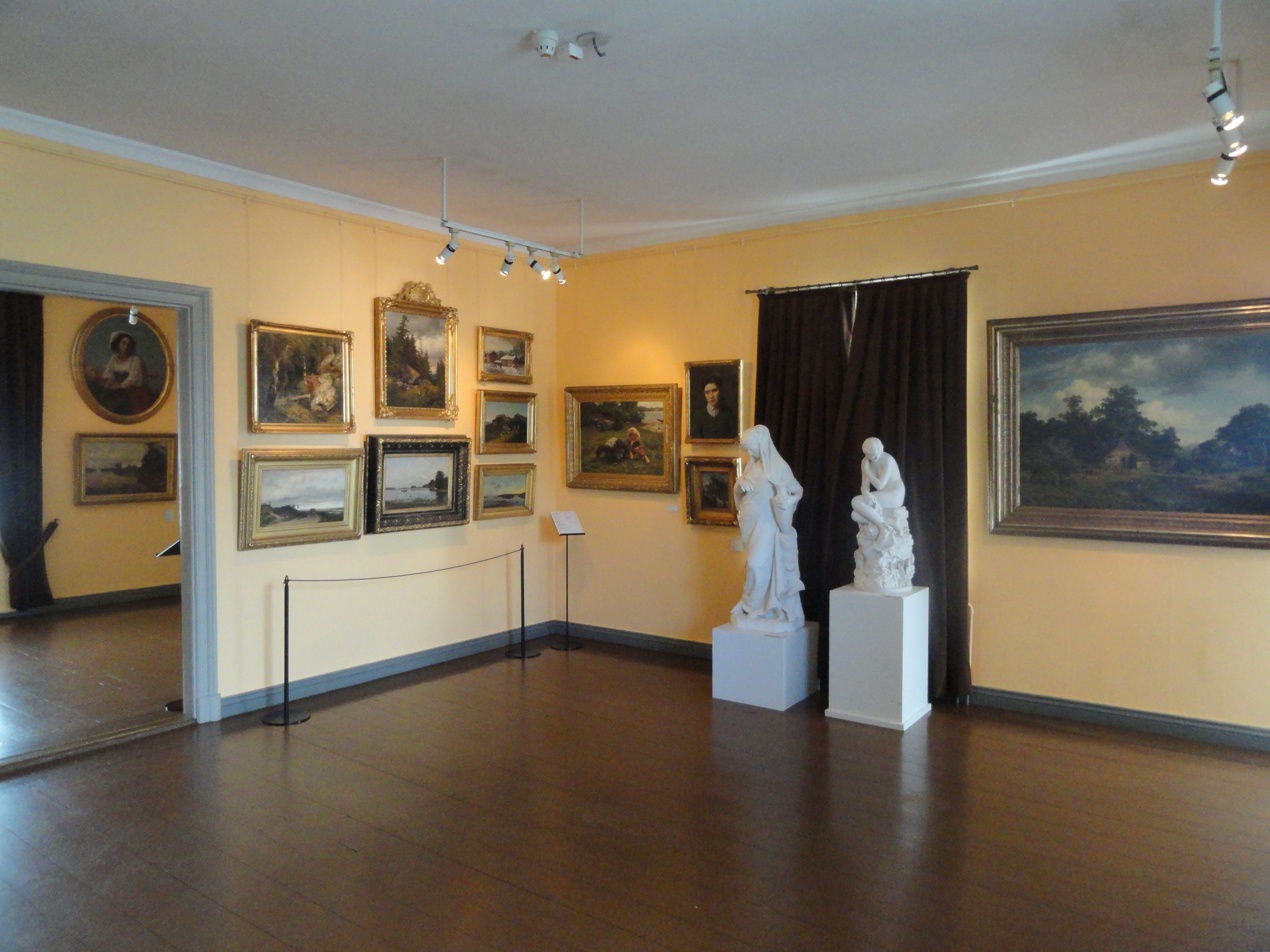
Interior with collections

The Cygnaeus Gallery (Finnish: Cygnaeuksen galleria, Swedish: Cygnaei galleri) is an art gallery in Helsinki.

The art gallery was founded by the professor of aesthetics Fredrik Cygnaeus. It was built as a villa in 1869–1870 to designs by architect J.F.W. Mieritz. Cygnaeus donated the gallery to the Finnish nation in his testament. It opened to the public in 1882, and is today owned by the Finnish Heritage Agency. It has been claimed to be the oldest still operating art museum in Finland. The gallery contains mainly Finnish art from the 19th century, c. 200 works in total. Among artists represented are Albert Edelfelt, the Von Wright brothers, Fanny Churberg and Helene Schjerfbeck.

Apart from the permanent collections the museum also hosts temporary exhibitions and is used, among other things, as concert venue.

In 2014 it was closed down for the time being for lack of funding by the Heritage Agency.
