= La Vie moderne (disambiguation) =

La Vie moderne (Modern Life) is a 2000 French film directed by Laurence Ferreira Barbosa.

La Vie moderne may also refer to:

- La Vie moderne (1879-1883), a French literary review published by Georges Charpentier and with Émile Bergerat as editor
- La Vie moderne, a 2008 French film directed by Raymond Depardon
