= Madame Georges Charpentier and Her Children =

1878 painting by Pierre-Auguste Renoir

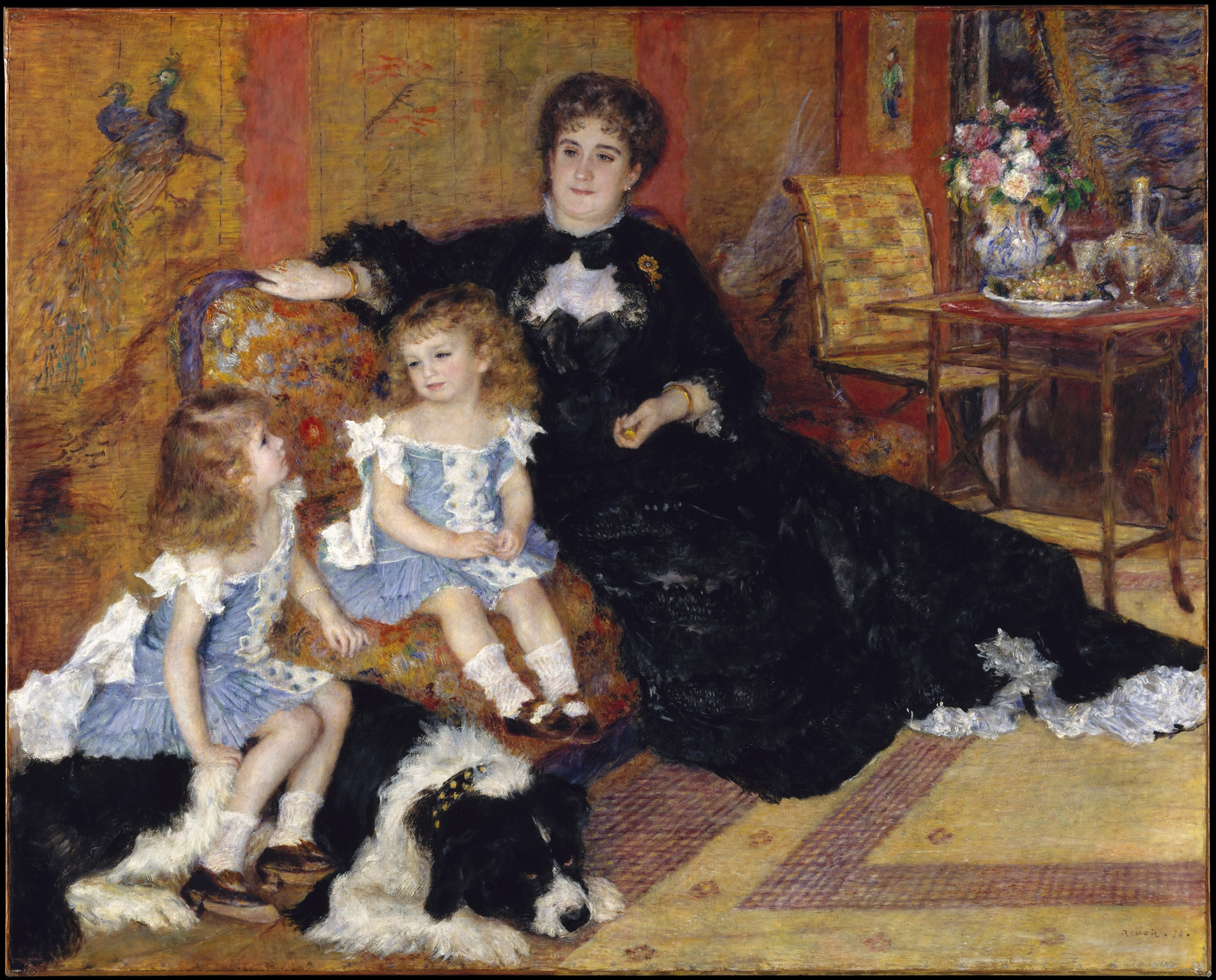
- Artist: Pierre-Auguste Renoir
- Year: 1878
- Medium: oil on canvas
- Dimensions: 153.7 cm × 190.2 cm (60.5 in × 74.9 in)
- Location: Metropolitan Museum of Art; New York

Madame Georges Charpentier and Her Children (also known as Madame Charpentier and Her Children) is an 1878 oil on canvas painting by Pierre-Auguste Renoir. It depicts Marguerite Charpentier, a French salonist, art collector, and advocate of the Impressionists, and her children Georgette and Paul. The painting is held by the Metropolitan Museum of Art.

== Background ==
French publisher Georges Charpentier (1846-1905), a wealthy patron of the naturalist genre of writers, particularly French author Émile Zola, was an early advocate and collector of Impressionist works. He married Marguerite Lemonnier in 1871. Georges began buying paintings by French artist Pierre-Auguste Renoir (1841–1919) in the 1870s. Charpentier purchased two landscapes and one portrait by Renoir at the Second Impressionist Exhibition in 1875, including The angler (Le Pêcheur à la ligne, 1874), Garden with dahlias (Jardin aux dahlias), and Head of a woman (1875). After the auction, Zola introduced Charpentier to Renoir. By 1876, Marguerite and her husband became known for holding Friday salons at their house at 11-13 rue de Grenelle, attracting the most famous writers, artists, musicians, and politicians in Paris. At this time, Renoir, Claude Monet (1840–1926), and Alfred Sisley (1839–1899) were sending letters of correspondence to the Charpentier family appealing for financial help. From 1876 to 1879, the Charpentiers became Renoir's primary patrons.

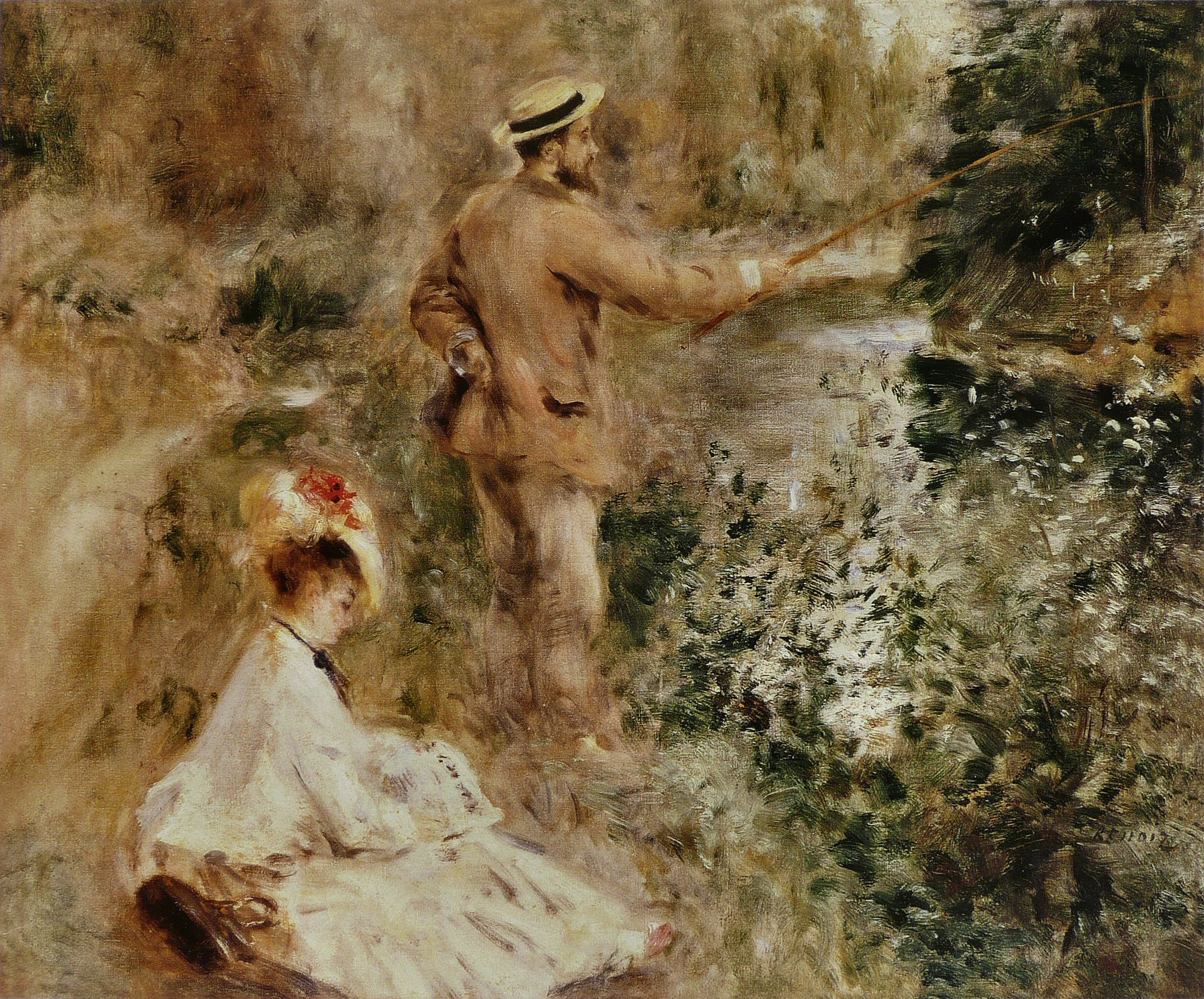
The angler (Le Pêcheur à la ligne, 1874)

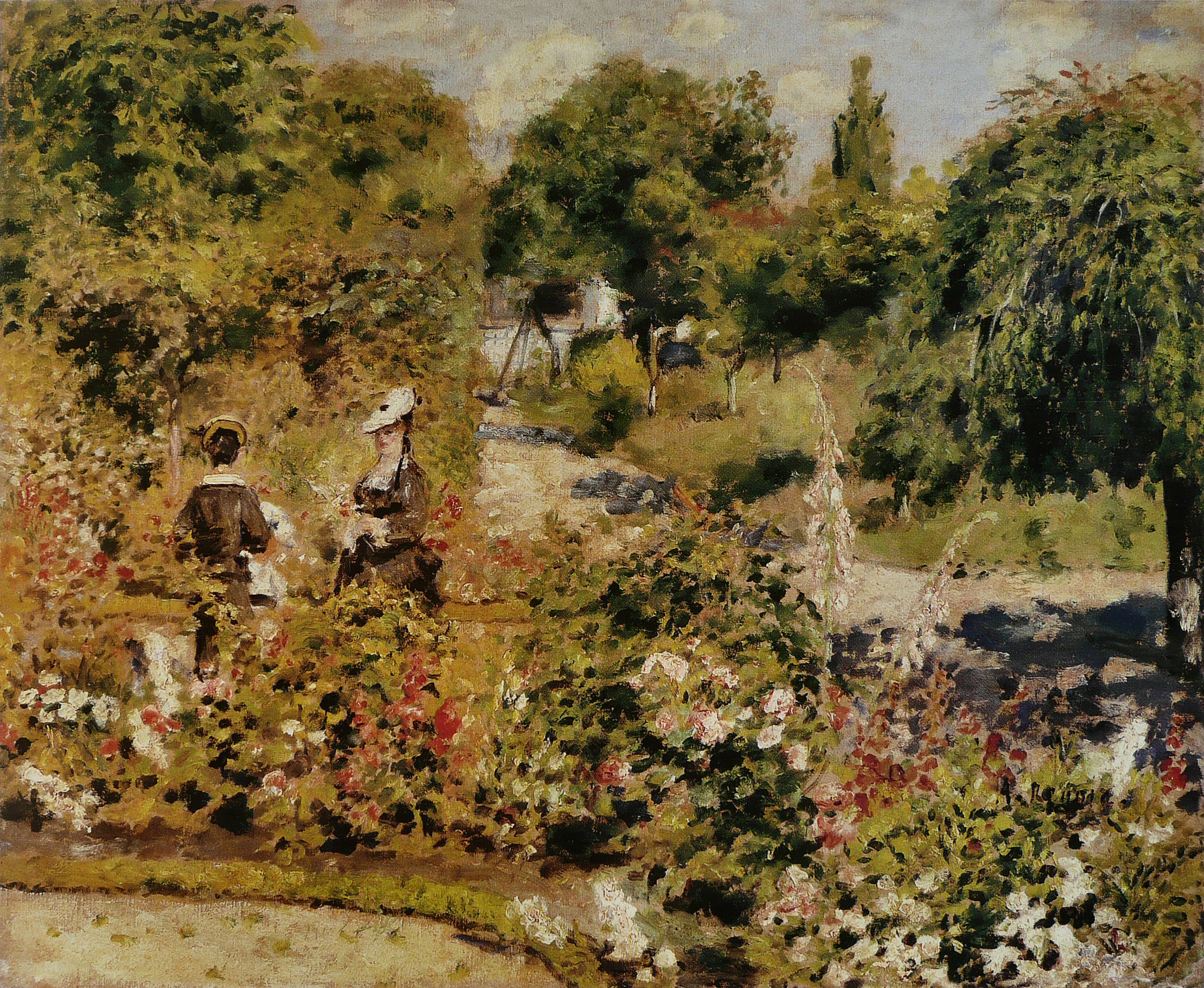
Garden with dahlias (1873 - 1874), aka Jardin aux dahlias

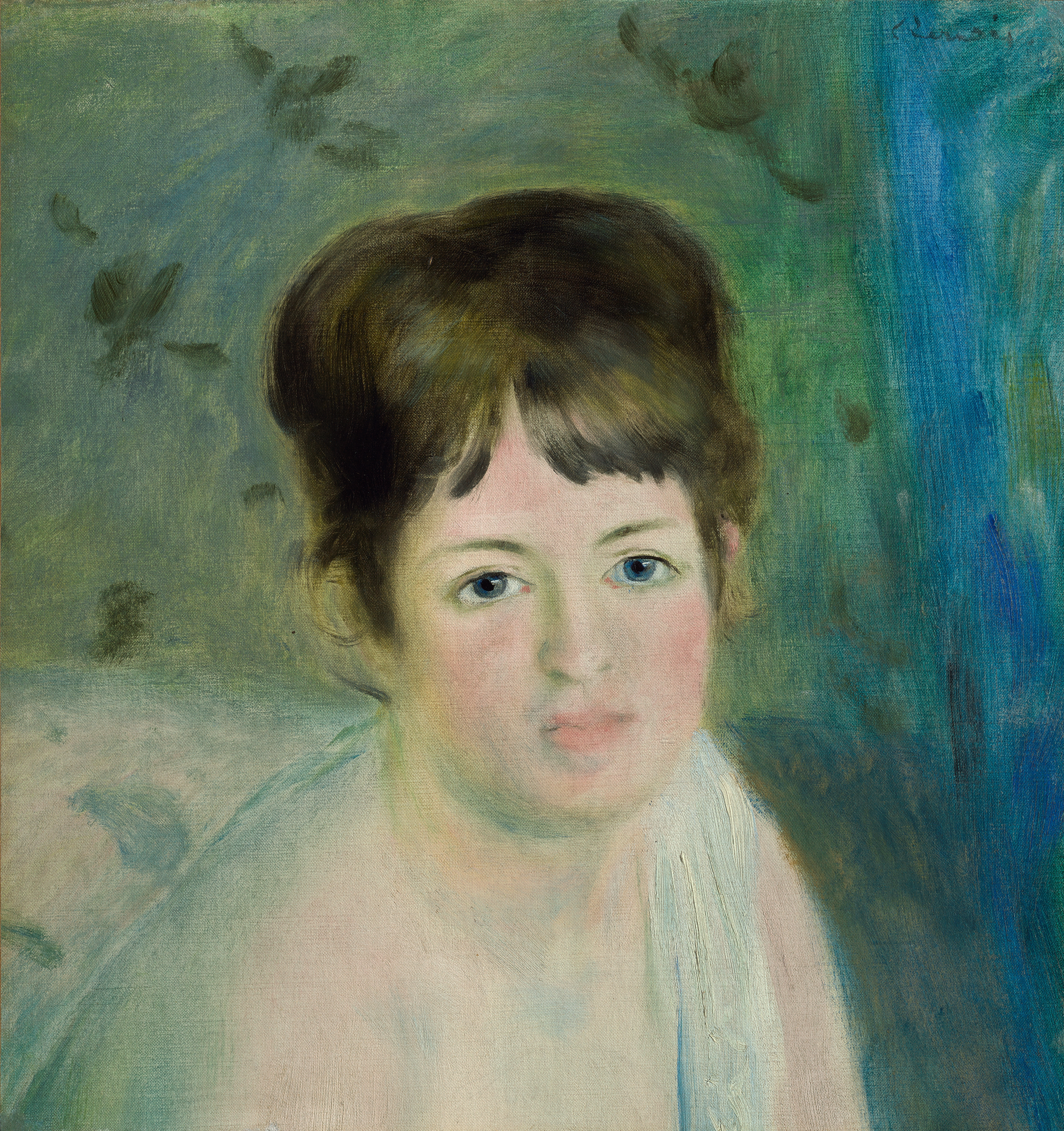
Head of a woman (1875)

== Development ==
Madame Charpentier commissioned a portrait of her daughter (Mademoiselle Georgette Charpentier) from Renoir in 1876, and a year or so later a portrait of her son (Paul Charpentier). In that same year, Renoir received a commission from Georges Charpentier to paint a portrait of his wife. He submitted the bust portrait of Madame Georges Charpentier, showing her head in three-quarters pose to the right, and that of Georgette, along with six other paintings to the third Impressionist exhibition on the Rue Le Peletier in April 1877. (Note: Some of the paintings submitted include The Swing, Bal du Moulin de la Galette, Portrait of Madame A.D., Portrait of Mr. Sisley, Portrait of Miss S., and The Seine in Champrosay.) French art historian Léonce Bénédite would later describe the initial painting of Madame Charpentier as an "exquisite little portrait" and a "charming likeness". British art historian Colin B. Bailey argues that these portraits of Madame Charpentier and Georgette were a trial run for his subsequent work that would reach the Salon just several years later. These initial works were successfully received by the public and led to a second commission for what would become Madame Charpentier and Her Children. Georges Charpentier commissioned the painting from Renoir for 1000 francs, although according to Charpentier's youngest daughter Madame Dubar, Renoir persuaded him to accept the second commission. Madame Charpentier and Her Children took a long time to complete, necessitating many different sittings for Renoir to fully capture the image on his canvas. The painting took Renoir a month to finish, from September to October 1878.

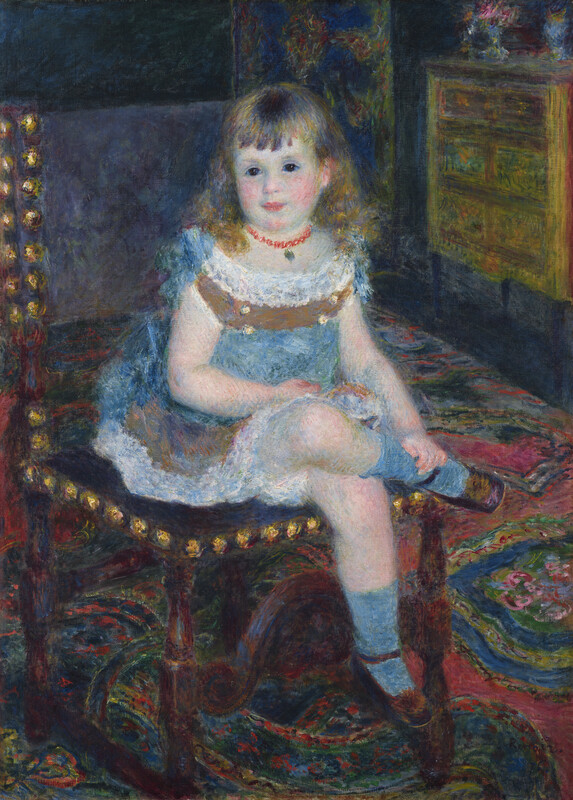
Mademoiselle Georgette Charpentier (1876)

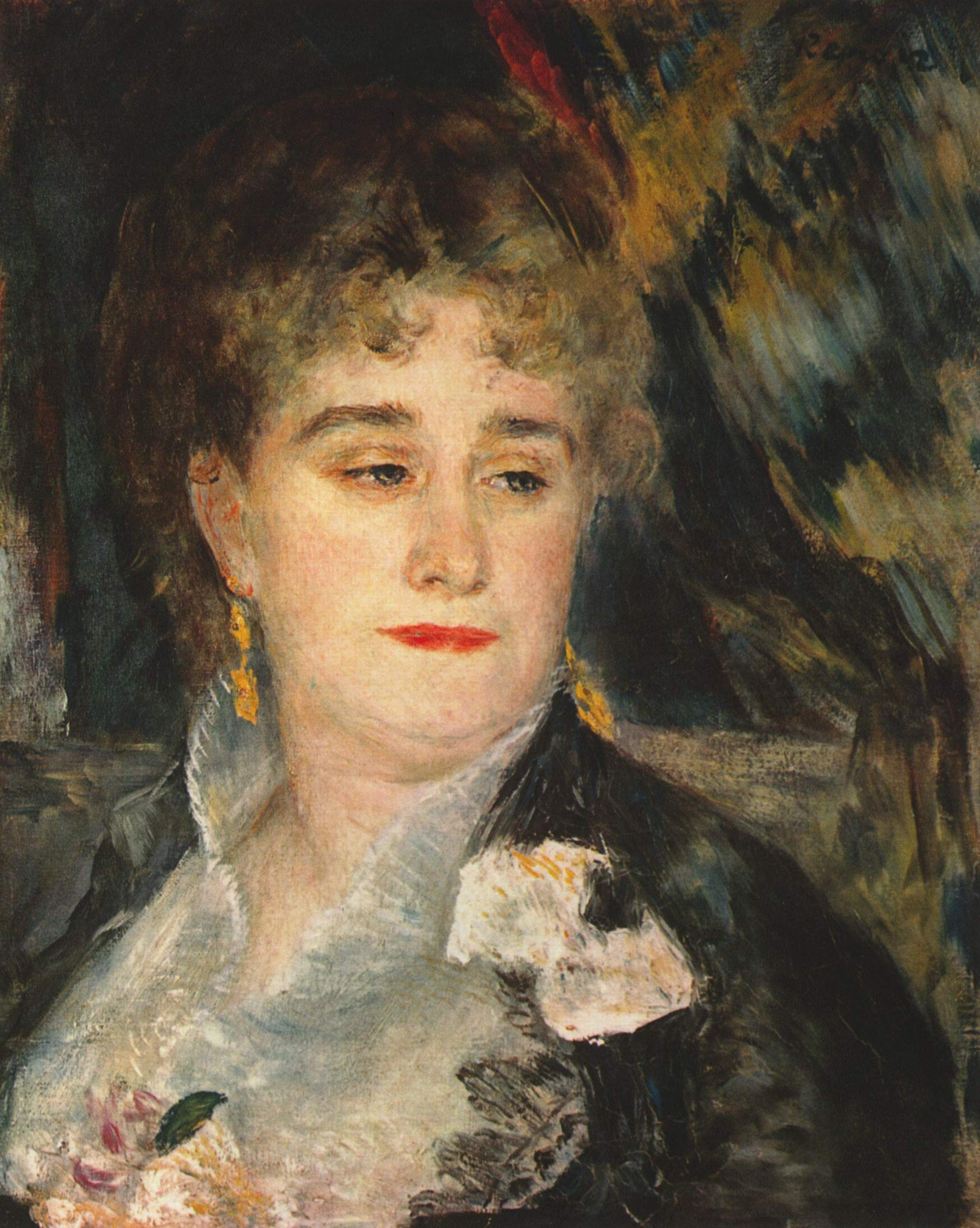
Portrait of Madame Charpentier (1876-1877)

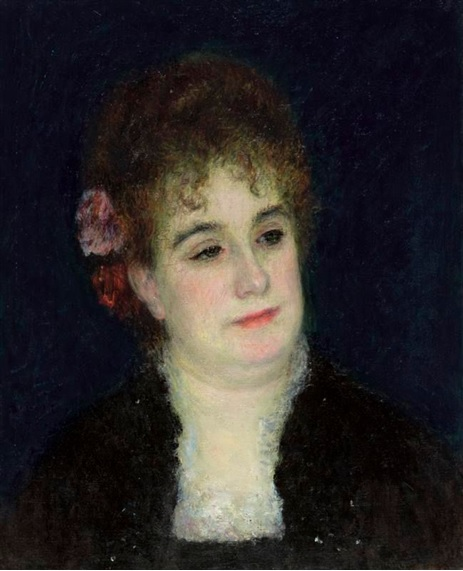
Portrait of Madame Charpentier (n.d.)

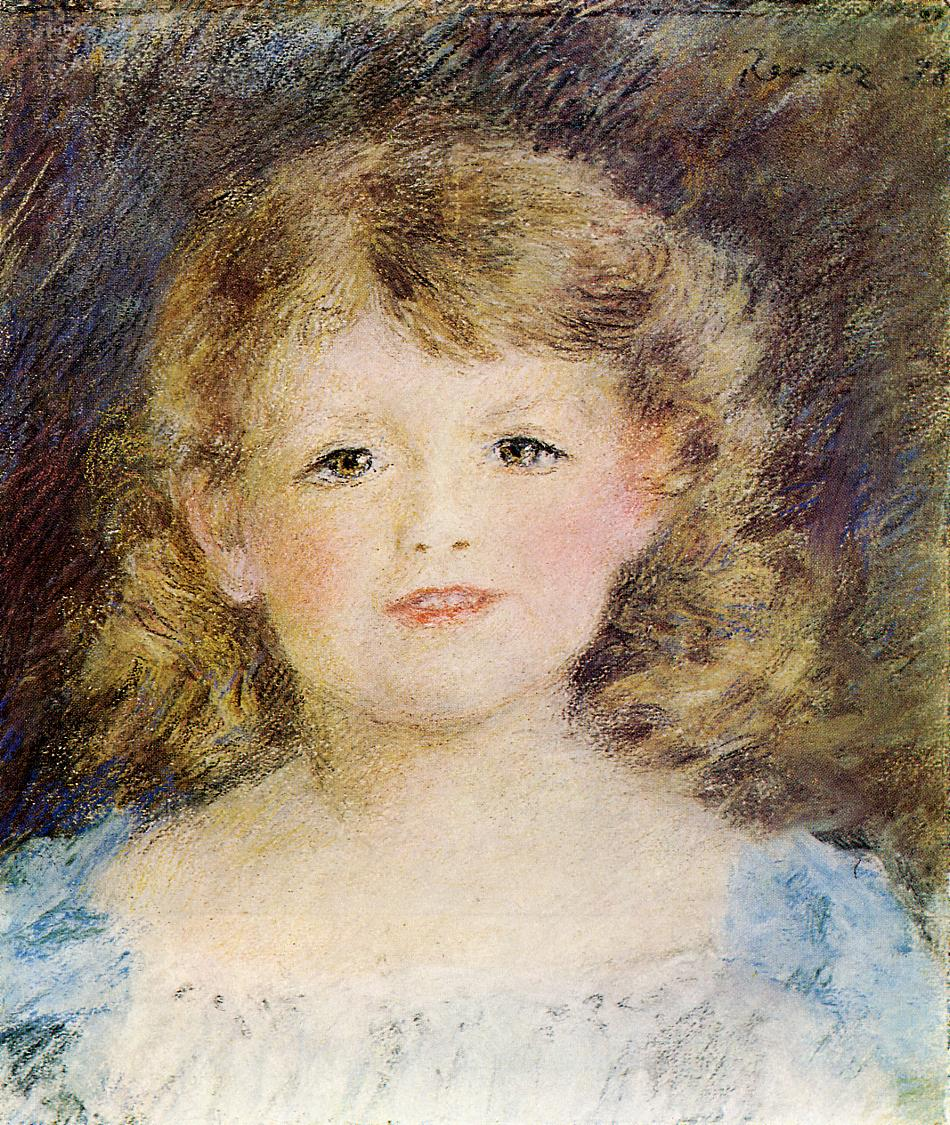
Paul Charpentier (~1877)

== Description ==
The large painting depicts Madame Charpentier sitting with her children in her luxurious home on the rue de Grenelle. She appears in a private sitting room next to the bedroom in her home, with the background decorated in multicolored Japanese art and bamboo. It is an intimate setting that was only familiar to the family, as French guest etiquette would have precluded entry to the public in this part of the home. The fact that Madame wears a stylish and graceful gown appropriate for guests in the midst of this private setting instead of clothing unique to the boudoir, preserves the demarcation enforced between the personal and the social. Her black dress with lace and a bodice fastened at her neck with a ribbon, opens to display her throat, while she sits on a divan cushion with her hand on her knee with her children next to her. She watches her children with a smile, both of whom wear matching blue dresses and hairstyles, as was the custom of the day; boys and girls would often be dressed alike in France until they reached four or five years of age. Madame Charpentier has her arm around her son, Paul Émile, who sits next to his mother on the sofa, while his sister Georgette sits on the back of Porthos, her Newfoundland dog lying on the floor. The black and white fur of the dog repeats the black and white contrast of Madame Charpentier's fashionable dress. The painting is signed and dated "Renoir 78" in the lower right corner.

== Exhibition ==
The painting was exhibited at the Salon of 1879 (no. 2527). It was later exhibited in Brussels in 1886 (no. 2); at Georges Petit gallery in Paris in 1886 (no. 124); by Renoir in 1892 and 1900 (no. 17); and finally in Brussels in 1904 (no. 129).

== Critical reception ==
Léonce Bénédite describes the painting as one of Renoir's best works, and expresses regret that it should have ever left France "where its place awaited it by the side of the masterpieces of our national artists".

== Style and themes ==
Kathleen Adler of the National Gallery writes that "Renoir's portraits of female sitters often include references to a setting that serves to position them in terms of wealth and status".

== Provenance ==
Marguerite Charpentier died in 1904, and her husband subsequently died in 1905. Their daughters began the process of selling their collection in an auction with Madame Charpentier and Her Children advertised for sale with competition from art dealers around the world expected to generate interest. English painter and art critic Roger Fry, who was appointed Curator of Paintings at the Metropolitan Museum of Art in New York in 1906, was convinced by French art dealer Paul Durand-Ruel (1831–1922) to purchase the painting on behalf of the Met. Durand-Ruel prevailed, and the painting was purchased in April 1907 for 84,000 francs.

== Fashion ==
The black silk dress Madame Charpentier poses with in the painting was created by English fashion designer Charles Frederick Worth of the House of Worth, widely considered the father of haute couture. According to personal stylist Sam Ratelle, the black velvet tuxedo dress designed by Christian Siriano for American actor Billy Porter to wear at the 91st Academy Awards was inspired by Madame Charpentier's dress in the painting.

== Related work ==
Art curator Trevor Fairbrother notes that American artist John Singer Sargent (1856–1925) draws upon similar depictions in his painting The Daughters of Edward Darley Boit (1882). Sargent was familiar with Madame Georges Charpentier and Her Children after it appeared at the Salon. Art historian Anne Dawson observes that the visual elements in the portrait Emma and Her Children (1923) by American realist painter George Wesley Bellows (1882–1925) are suggestive of Renoir's painting. Writer Carrie Coolidge notes that Bellows was a fan of Renoir and the painting. French novelist Marcel Proust viewed the painting on one of his visits to the Charpentiers and later added it to Le Temps retrouvé (Time Regained), the last and seventh volume of In Search of Lost Time.

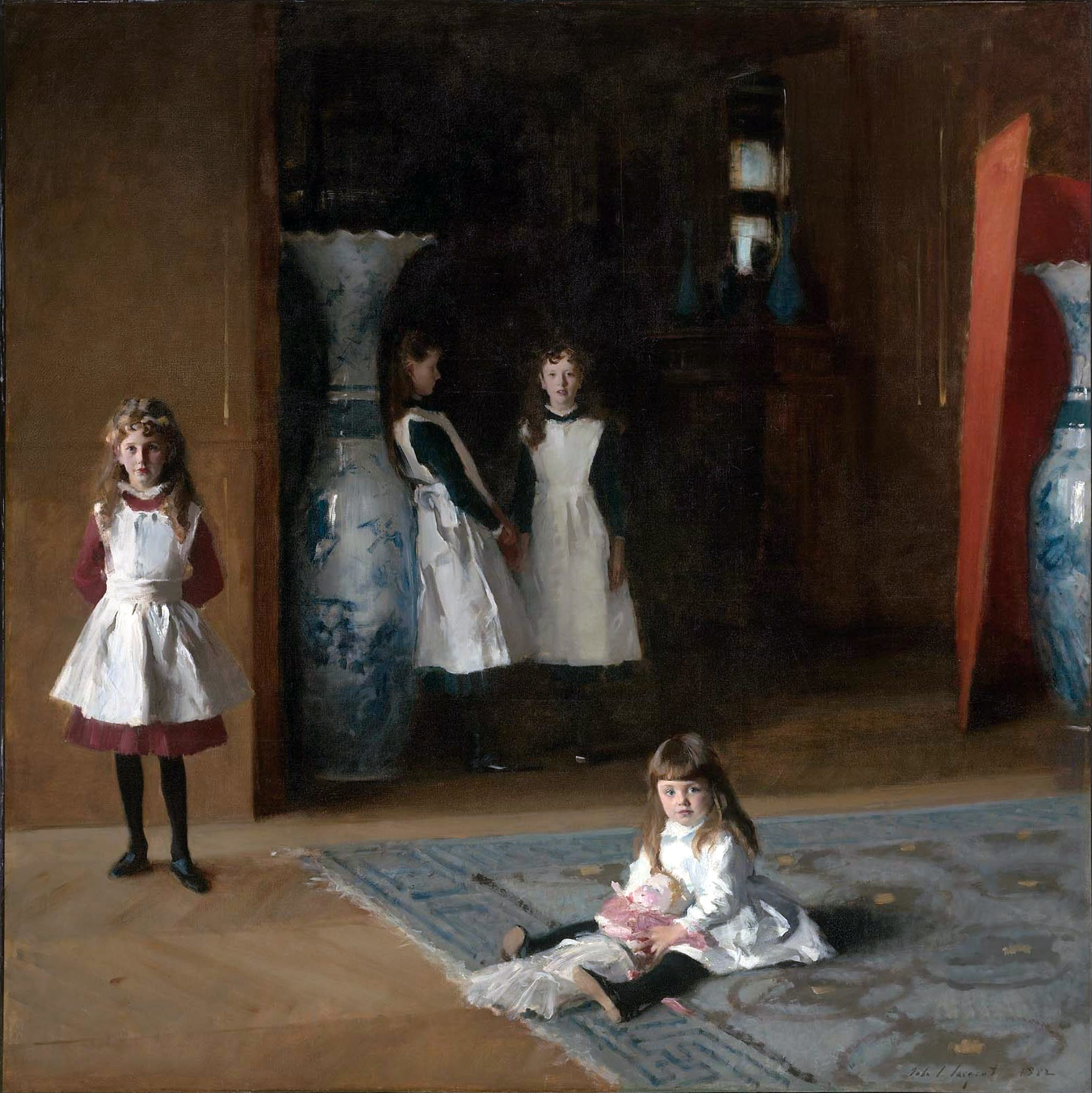
The Daughters of Edward Darley Boit (1882) by John Singer Sargent

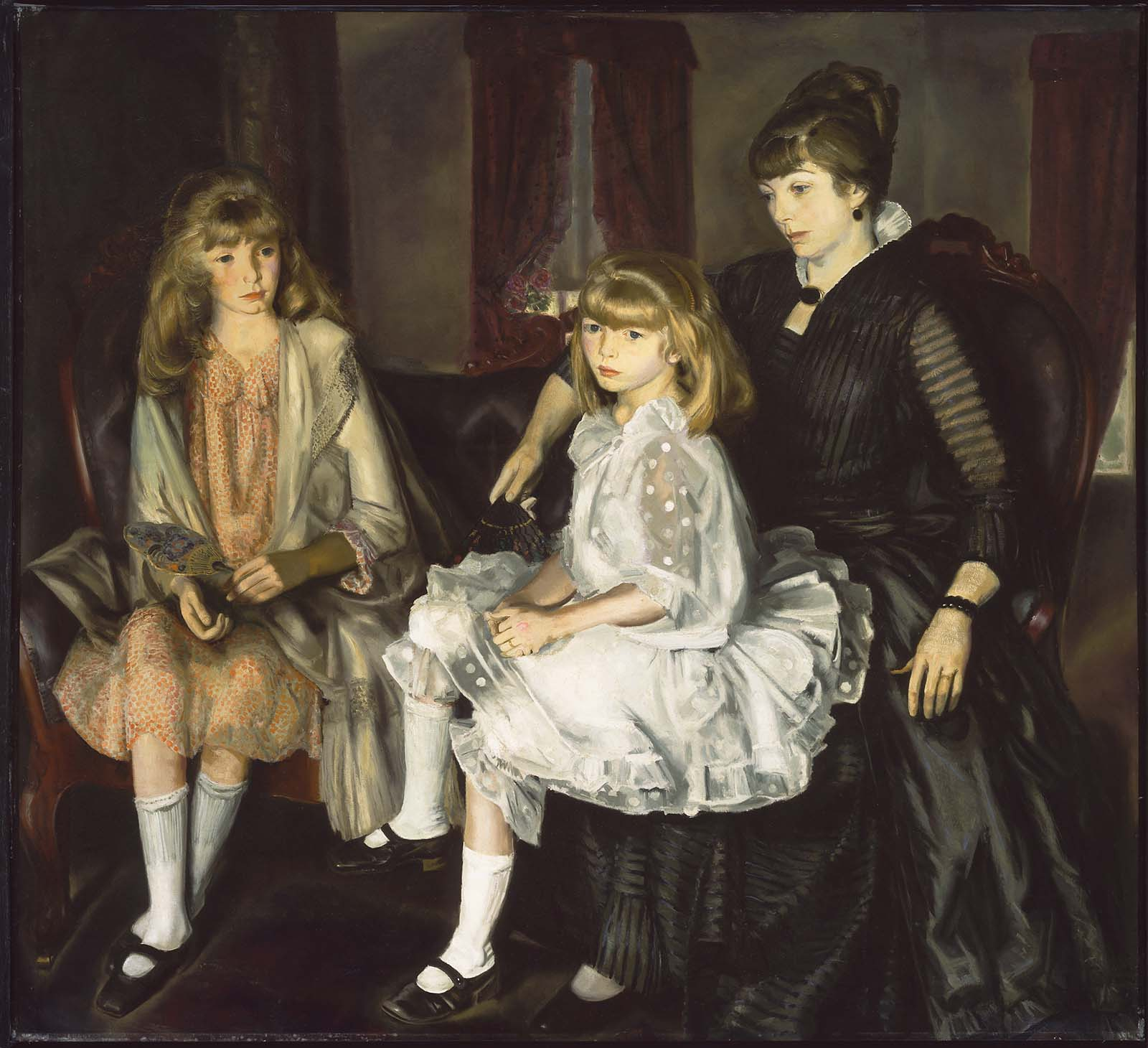
Emma and Her Children (1923) by George Wesley Bellows

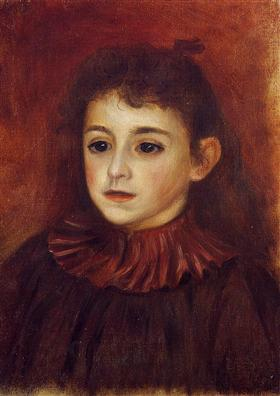
Mademoiselle Georgette Charpentier (1878)

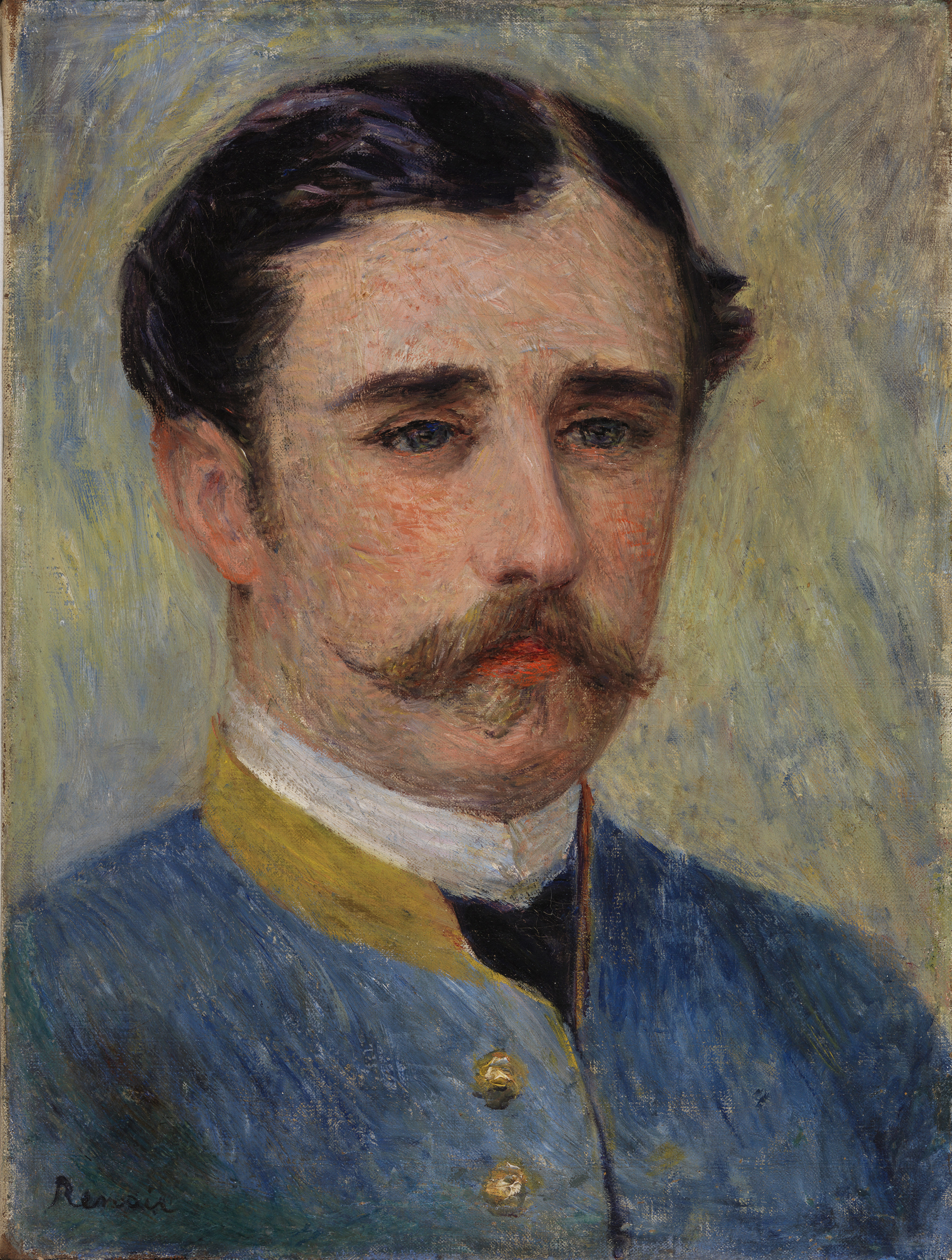
Portrait of a Man (Monsieur Charpentier) (1879)

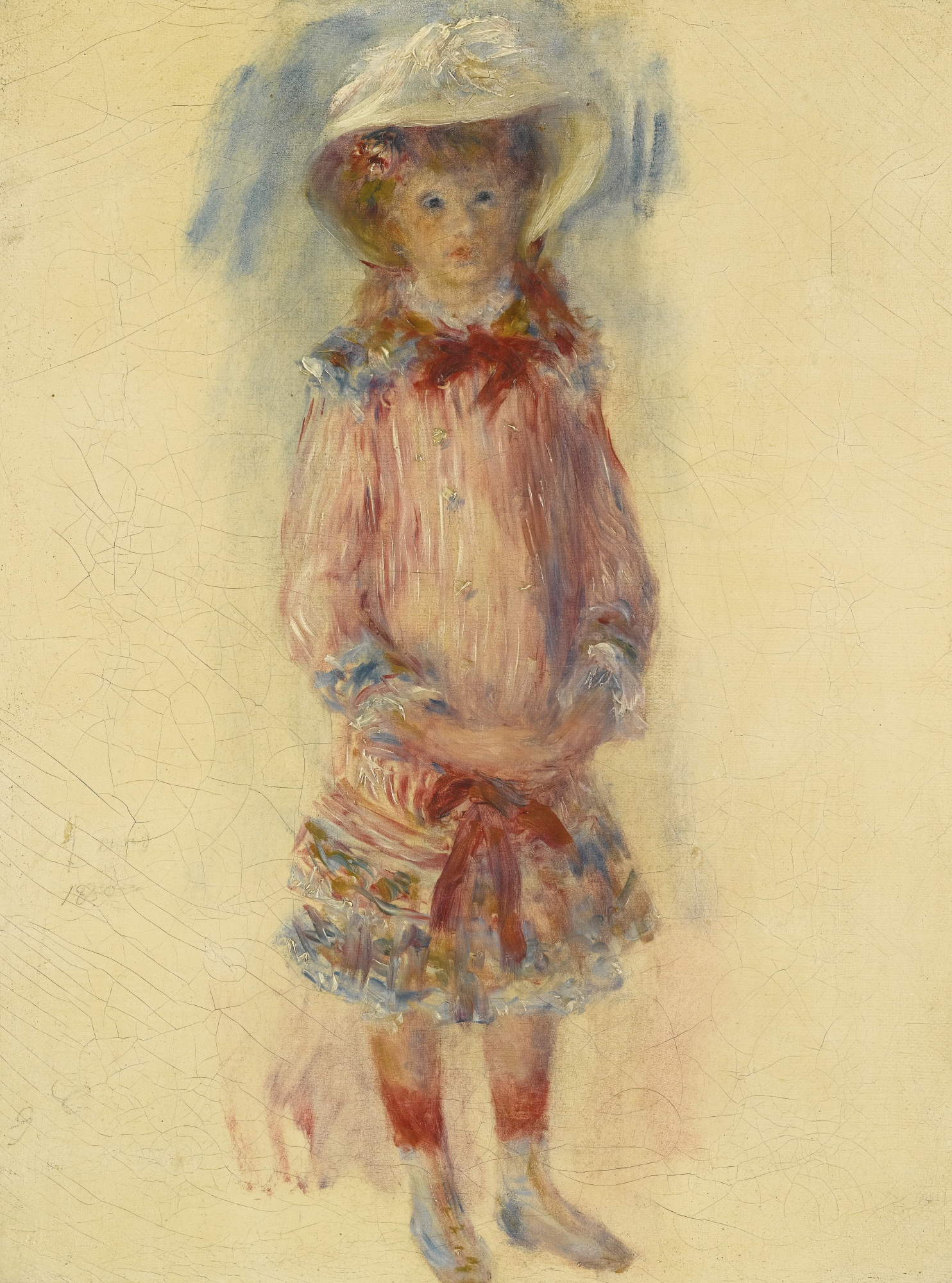
Georgette Charpentier (1880)

== See also ==
- List of paintings by Pierre-Auguste Renoir

== Notes and references ==
Notes

== Bibliography ==
- Adler, Kathleen (1995). "Renoir's "Portrait of Albert Cahen d'Anvers"". The J. Paul Getty Museum Journal. 23: 31–40. JSTOR 4166651. ISBN 0892363398. OCLC 982297441.
- Bénédite, Léonce (December 1907). "Madame Charpentier and her Children, by Auguste Renoir". The Burlington Magazine. Vol. XII. pp. 130-134. OCLC 1136521580.
- Bailey, Colin B. (1997). Renoir's Portraits: Impressions of an Age. Yale University Press. National Gallery of Canada. ISBN 0888846681. OCLC 37208933.
- Bailey, Colin B. (2007). "'The Greatest Luminosity, Colour and Harmony': Renoir's Landscapes, 1862-1883". In Bailey, Colin B.; Riopelle, Christopher; Zarobell, John. Renoir Landscapes, 1865-1883. National Gallery. ISBN 9781857093223. OCLC 72868889.
- Coolidge, Carrie (September 25, 2017). "The Family Portrait". Barrons. Retrieved July 14, 2023.
- Dawson, Anne Elizabeth (2002). Idol of the Moderns: Pierre-Auguste Renoir and American Painting. ISBN 0937108308. OCLC 51046497.
- Distel, Anne (1990). Impressionism: The First Collectors. Trans. by Barbara Perroud-Benson. Harry N. Abrams. ISBN 0-8109-3160-5. OCLC 20566765.
- Distel, Anne (1995). Renoir: A Sensuous Vision. "Abrams Discoveries" series. New York: Harry N. Abrams. ISBN 9780810928756. OCLC 34704757.
- Duret, Théodore (1910)[1902]. Manet and the French Impressionists. Trans. by J. E. Crawford Flitch. G. Richards. OCLC 744658.
- Fairbrother, Trevor (2003). "Catalogue: American Artists (200-226). John Singer Sargent. The Daughters of Edward Darley Boit". In Tinterow, Gary; Lacambre, Geneviève; Roldán, Deborah L. (ed.). Manet/Velázquez: The French taste for Spanish Painting. Metropolitan Museum of Art. ISBN 978-0300098808. OCLC 51505662.
- Hanson, Lawrence. (1968). Renoir: the Man, the Painter, and His World. Dodd, Mead. OCLC 442210.
- House, John (1994). Renoir: Master Impressionist. Queensland Art Gallery. ISBN 9781875460083. OCLC 1113349089.
- Moffett, Charles S. (1974). "Madame Charpentier and Her Children". In Dayez, Anne; Hoog, Michel; Moffett, Charles S. (ed.). Impressionism: A Centenary Exhibition. The Metropolitan Museum of Art, December 12, 1974–February 10, 1975. The Metropolitan Museum of Art. pp. 190-194. ISBN 0870990977. OCLC 951244817.
- Mancoff, Debra N. (2012). Fashion in Impressionist Paris. Merrell. ISBN 9781858945828. OCLC 780482739.
- Muehlig, Linda D. (2000). "Portrait of Léon Riesener, 1879, study for illustration in La Vie Moderne, 17 April 1879". In Sievers, Ann H.; Muehlig, Linda D.; Rich, Nancy. Master Drawings from the Smith College Museum of Art. Hudson Hills Press. ISBN 9781555951832. OCLC 44270398.
- Silver, Jocelyn (February 25, 2019). "The Story Behind Billy Porter's Triumphant Oscars Gown". PAPER. Retrieved July 14, 2023.
- Søndergaard, Sidsel Maria (2006). "Women in Impressionism: An Introduction". In Women in Impressionism: From Mythical Feminine to Modern Woman. Skira. ISBN 9788774522836. OCLC 77058155.
- Sterling, Charles; Salinger, Margaretta (1967). French Paintings: A Catalogue of the Collection of The Metropolitan Museum of Art. Vol. 3, Nineteenth and Twentieth Centuries. Metropolitan Museum of Art. OCLC 756416022
- White, Barbara Ehrlich (2017). Renoir: An Intimate Biography. Thames & Hudson. ISBN 9780500774038. OCLC 1012226709.
