= Portrait of Countess Albazzi =

1880 painting by Édouard Manet

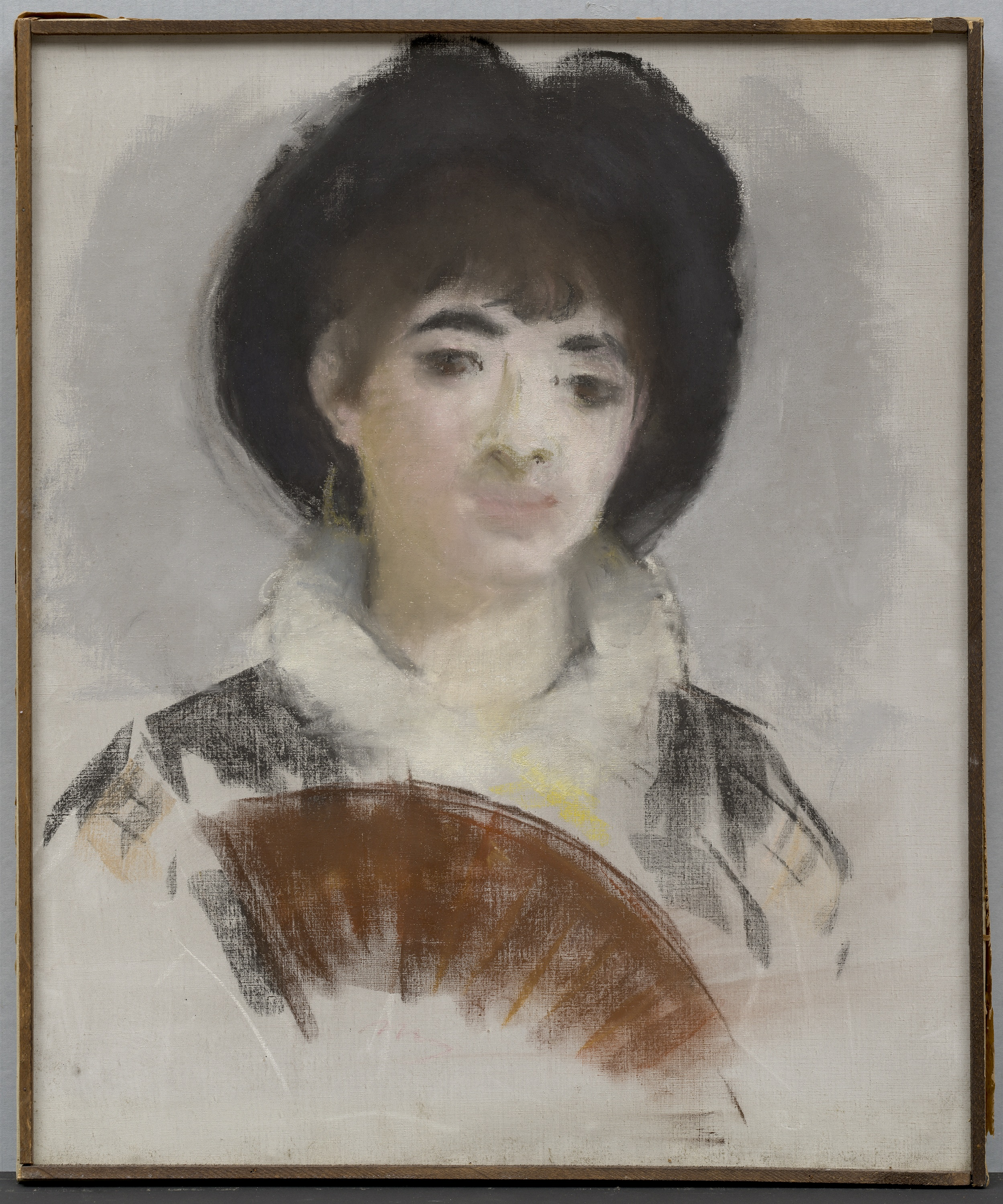
Portrait of Countess Albazzi (1880) by Édouard Manet

Portrait of Countess Albazzi is a painting by Édouard Manet, executed in 1880, which became a part of the Thannhauser Collection of the Solomon R. Guggenheim Museum as a bequest of Hilde Thannhauser.

This portrait by Manet is a pastel executed on a very fine canvas stretched over wood. Off-white priming was used, the pastel is friable, and there are a number of tiny losses throughout the surface of the canvas.

Portrait of Countess Albazzi was among Manet's last works, and has been shown in Paris, Bern and Martigny exhibitions, in Europe.

During the period when this portrait was executed (1880), Manet was participating annually in the Paris Salon, and working towards a solo exhibition arranged by Georges Charpentier.

== See also ==
- List of paintings by Édouard Manet
- 1880 in art
