= Black Christian Siriano gown of Billy Porter =

Tuxedo dress worn by Billy Porter

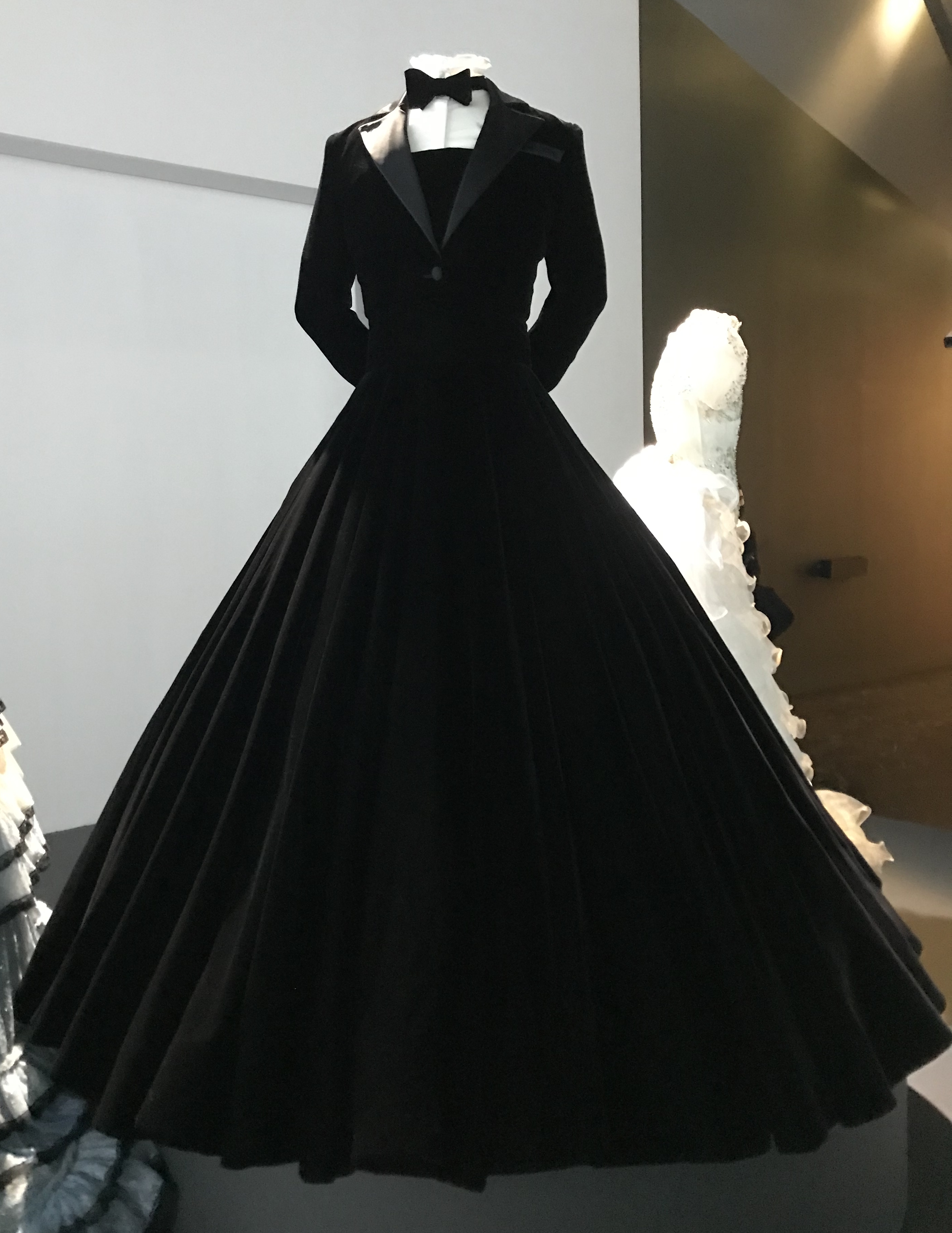
The tuxedo dress, pictured at Fashioning Masculinities: The Art of Menswear, Victoria and Albert Museum, March 2022

American actor Billy Porter wore a tuxedo dress in black velvet designed by Christian Siriano on the red carpet of the 91st Academy Awards on February 24, 2019. At the time, Porter had recently come into public view for his breakout role in the FX television series Pose and had been receiving attention for his boundary-pushing red carpet attire during the 2018–19 film awards season. Following his appearance at the 76th Golden Globe Awards in a custom silver suit with fuchsia-lined cape, he was invited to host red carpet interviews at the upcoming Oscars pre-show. Porter approached Siriano and together they conceived the tuxedo gown.

The gown was well received by fashion journalists, who highlighted its elegant design. It cemented Porter's status as a celebrity and as a fashion icon. Critics have described it as a favorite Oscars dress and one of Porter's most fashionable red carpet looks. Porter considers the outfit a piece of political art intended to drive a conversation about men's fashion and masculinity, for which it has received praise from fashion writers, academics, and the general public, as well as criticism from conservative commentators.

== Background ==
Billy Porter first came to prominence after originating the role of drag queen "Lola" in the Broadway musical Kinky Boots in 2013, for which he won the 2013 Tony Award for Best Actor in a Musical. In 2018, he was cast as ball culture fashion designer Pray Tell in the critically acclaimed FX drama Pose, which critics have called his breakout role. Porter made several red carpet appearances during the 2018–19 film awards season on the strength of his performance in Pose, wearing outfits – both suits and dresses – by designers including Tom Ford and Michael Kors.

Porter was nominated for the Golden Globe Award for Best Actor in a Television Series Drama for his role in Pose. On January 6, 2019, he walked the red carpet at the 76th Golden Globe Awards in a custom silver suit with fuchsia-lined cape designed by Randi Rahm. Porter, who is gay, said he wanted to wear an outfit that would prompt a conversation about red carpet fashion and its relationship to masculinity for his first major awards show appearance. Following the Golden Globes, Porter's popularity soared; he later said the outfit "changed everything for me."

== Design and development ==
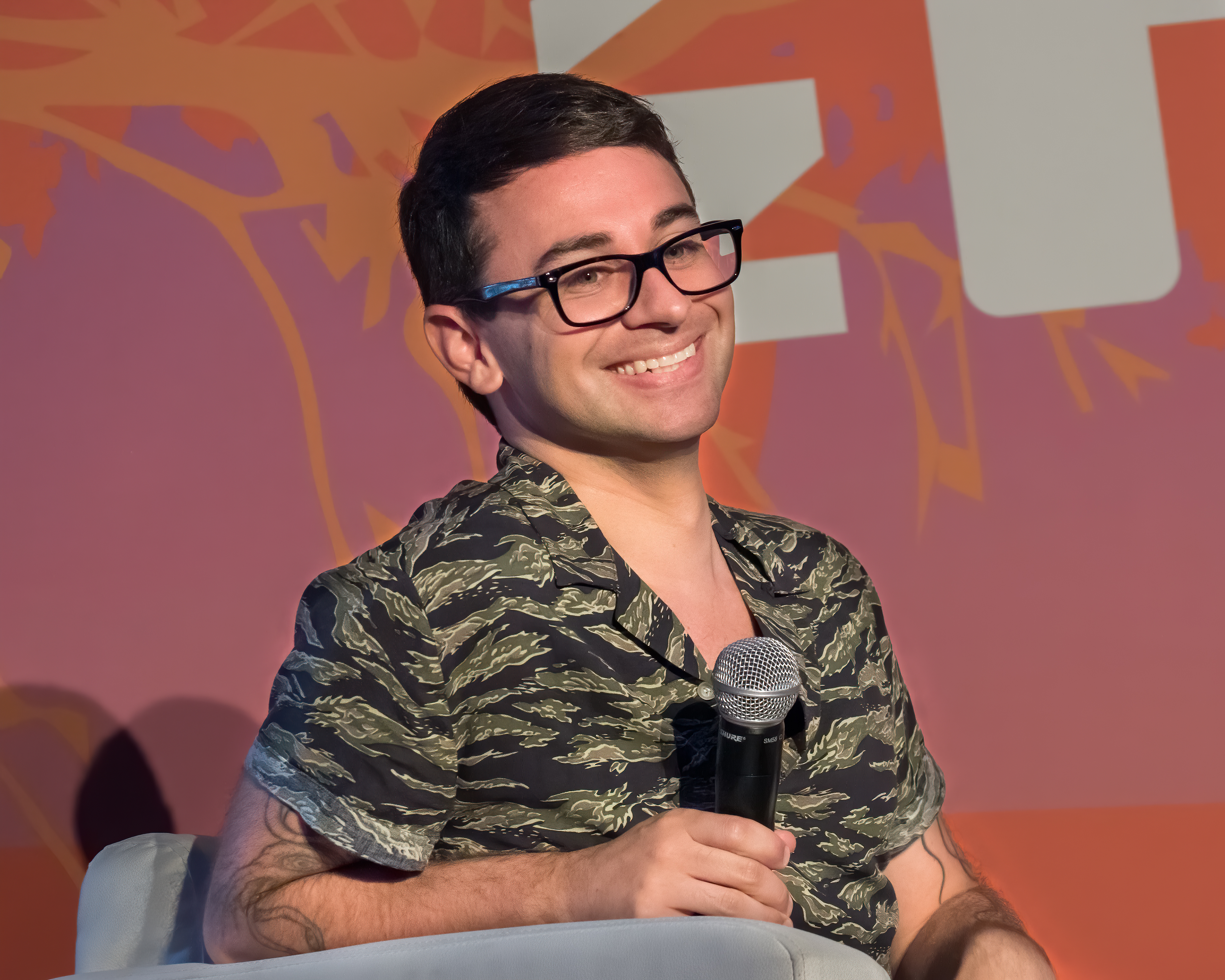
Designer Christian Siriano at OZY Fest (2018)

In early February 2019, ABC News asked Porter to host Oscars pre-show interviews on the red carpet at the 91st Academy Awards, scheduled for February 24. Porter wanted to wear a custom gown, and selected designer Christian Siriano based on his reputation for dressing celebrities whose bodies and style do not fit into conventional norms of beauty and fashion. Porter and his stylist Sam Ratelle approached Siriano after his February 9 show at New York Fashion Week.

Despite the short notice – custom red carpet gowns typically take months to complete – Siriano accepted immediately. Working from Porter's desire to play with gender norms, Siriano came up with the combined ball gown and tuxedo concept. He also designed a secondary outfit for Porter after discovering that the gown would be impractical for the stage where Porter was set to conduct interviews. The entire design was created over a single week. Siriano, Ratelle, and their teams worked up to 18 hours a day to complete the outfits.

The final ensemble comprised a full-length black velvet ball gown with a strapless bodice worn over a high-necked white tuxedo shirt with ruffled cuffs, topped by a black velvet tuxedo jacket with silk lapels and large black bow tie. The ball gown's skirt is reminiscent of gowns from the 1860s, with a flattened front and volume at the back and sides. The exaggerated size of the bow tie references the ornamental use of bows on feminine clothing. Porter wore jewelry by Oscar Heyman and six-inch heeled boots by Rick Owens with the outfit. After his arrival, Porter changed into a tuxedo with black velvet palazzo pants to conduct pre-show interviews.

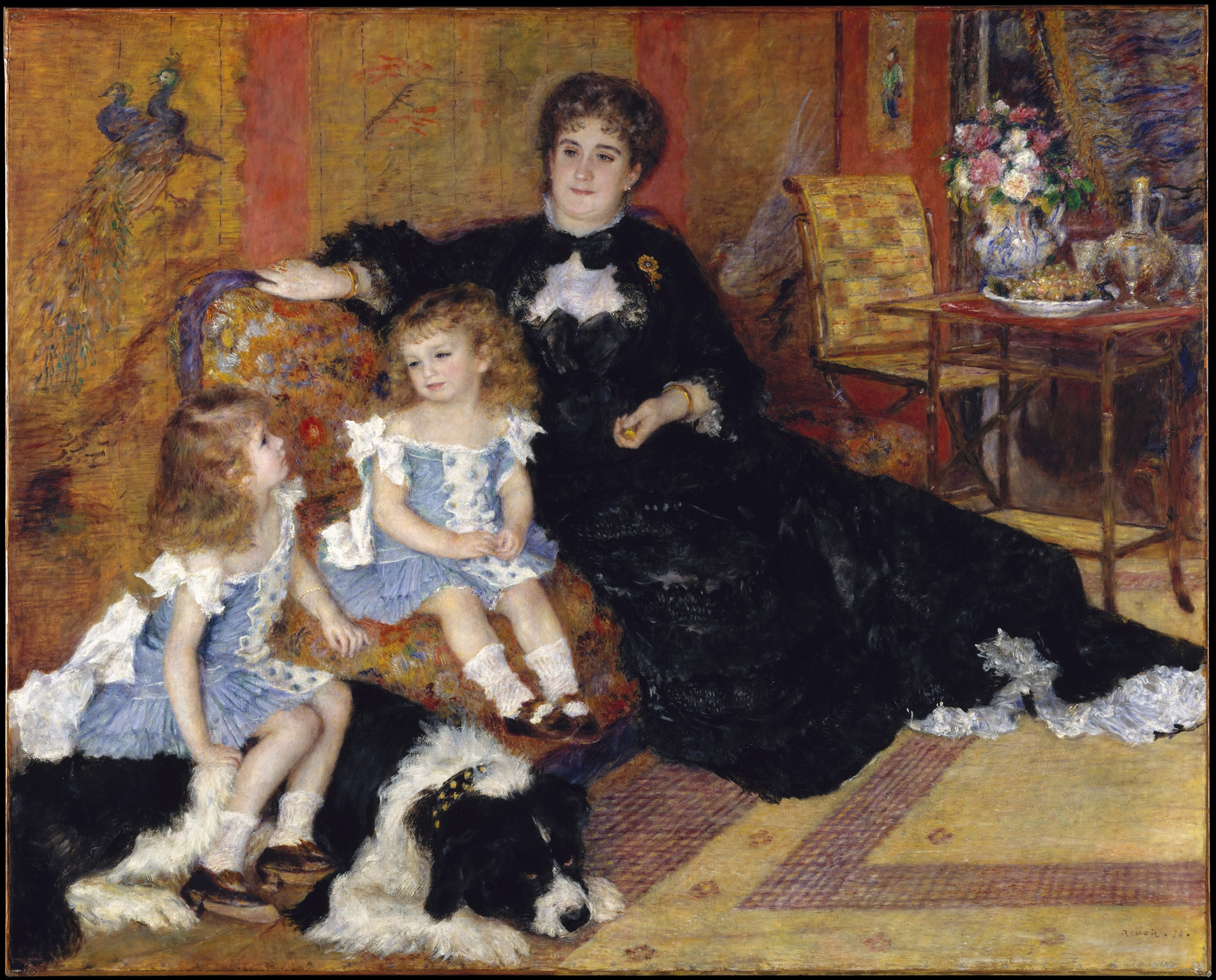
Madame Georges Charpentier and Her Children, Auguste Renoir, 1878.

Ratelle said the design had been inspired by the 1878 Pierre-Auguste Renoir painting Madame Georges Charpentier and Her Children. Users on social media compared Porter's outfit to a similar 1980s look by ball culture icon Hector Xtravaganza. Ratelle confirmed that the resemblance was unintentional, but stated that he and Porter felt it was an honor "to pay our respects to Hector". Fashion historian Lydia Edwards suggested that the use of black connected the dress to historical menswear and contemporary womenswear, and gave the ensemble a dignified yet dramatic impact.

Porter described the ensemble as a political statement that challenges norms of masculinity and femininity. Speaking to Vogue in 2019, he said, "This look was interesting because it's not drag. I'm not a drag queen, I'm a man in a dress." He later explained to Variety that he was interested in continuing to push the norms for what was considered acceptable for masculine red carpet fashion. He also called his choice to wear a dress to the Oscars a business decision, saying that as an entertainer, seeking attention via fashion was part of how he earned a living.

== Reception ==
Fashion critics responded positively to the dress upon its debut, highlighting its elegant design and boundary-pushing gender expression. Erica Gonzales of Harper's Bazaar wrote that it "looked worthy of its own Academy Award." Vanity Fair placed Porter on its "best dressed" list for 2019. People called the dress "one of the biggest style moments of the Oscars red carpet". Choire Sicha of The New York Times called his arrival "an exciting start" to the night, and expressed disappointment that few other guests dressed to subvert gender roles in the same way. The Philadelphia Inquirer called Porter "the belle of the gender-bending red carpet season". The New Yorker described it as "a sumptuous collision of butch-femme aesthetics". Several outlets felt that Porter's look had stolen the show. Some critics joked that he had "won" the red carpet completely. Several critics noted that the dress generated a significant response on social media platforms like Instagram and Twitter. Year-end data from the Google search engine showed that Porter's gown was the most-searched-for red carpet outfit of 2019.

Porter did attract some criticism for wearing a dress on the red carpet. American conservative political commentator Tomi Lahren called the look an "assault on masculinity". Users on social media accused him of contributing to the emasculation of black men. Porter dismissed these criticisms, saying, "I don't understand why my putting on a dress causes this much strife in your life."

In February 2020, the Twitter account of long-running children's show Sesame Street posted photos of Porter wearing the dress while filming an appearance on the show, prompting criticism from conservative commentators. Arkansas Republican state senator Jason Rapert made a series of critical posts on Facebook, culminating in the suggestion that he would pass a bill to cut funding from Arkansas PBS, the local PBS affiliate. Although long associated with Sesame Street, PBS had not actually funded the series since the program's move to HBO in 2015. Porter went ahead with the episode as planned, saying "If you don't like it, don't watch it."

== Legacy ==
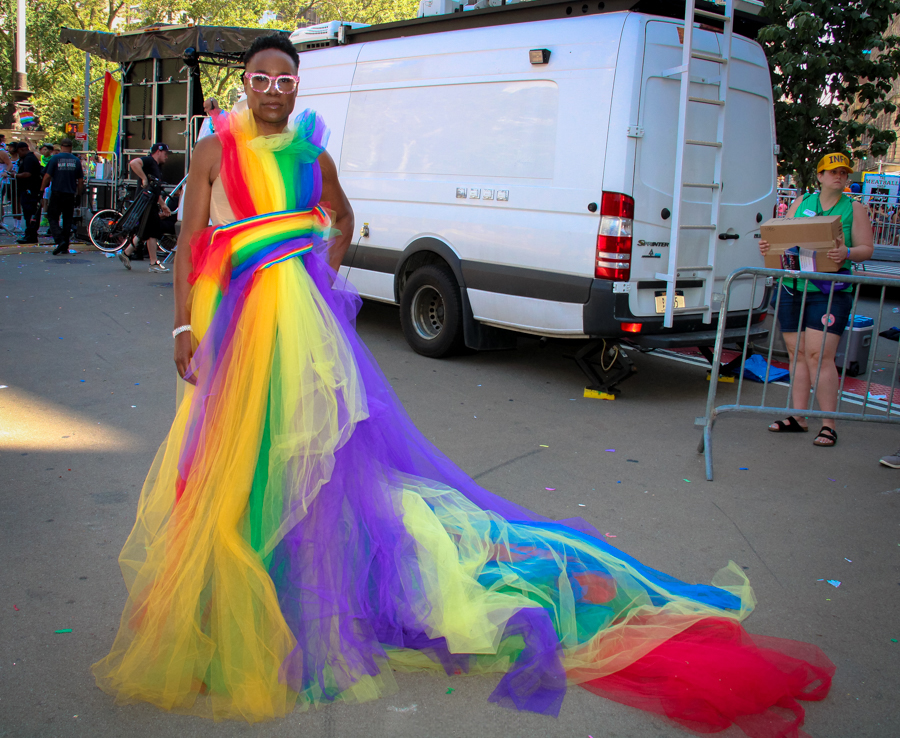
Porter at Stonewall 50 – WorldPride NYC 2019, gown by Siriano

Following his appearance at the 91st Academy Awards, Porter became popularly known as a fashion icon; the tuxedo gown was frequently mentioned as his first high-profile fashion moment and one of his most fashionable overall. According to Porter, his public profile took off after the Oscars, which he attributed directly to the impact of the tuxedo gown. Porter expressed surprise at the reaction to the gown, saying "I didn't know it was going to be a thiiinnng." In contrast, Siriano expected the dress to be a hit, saying "I don't think any man has ever worn a gown on the Oscars red carpet before."

Fashion critics writing in retrospect have described the tuxedo gown as an iconic Oscars dress. Writing for Allure in 2020, Ashley C. Ford called the look "the picture of poise and regality." CNN Style writer Marianna Cerini remembered Porter's outfit as "the only look everyone wanted to talk about". Los Angeles Times columnist Robin Abcarian, in a 2022 column about Oscars fashion, called the tuxedo gown a "tasteful way to challenge fashion orthodoxies."

Academics have also considered the legacy of the dress. Queer theorist Kathryn Bond Stockton agreed with Porter's statement that the dress was an expression of power, rhetorically asking if it could "move whole systems". Lydia Edwards agreed that the gown was a "powerful statement of the individual's queer identity", but felt that the ball gown was unlikely to become known as a "genderless" garment given its "unrelenting feminine history". Elizabeth Castaldo Lundén placed the tuxedo dress in counterpoint to a long history of women wearing suits at the Oscars. Lundén also noted that although Porter wore another gown to the 92nd Academy Awards in 2020, the press had by then "incorporated his fashion statement into the usual pool of red-carpet critique", so it was no longer treated as unusual.

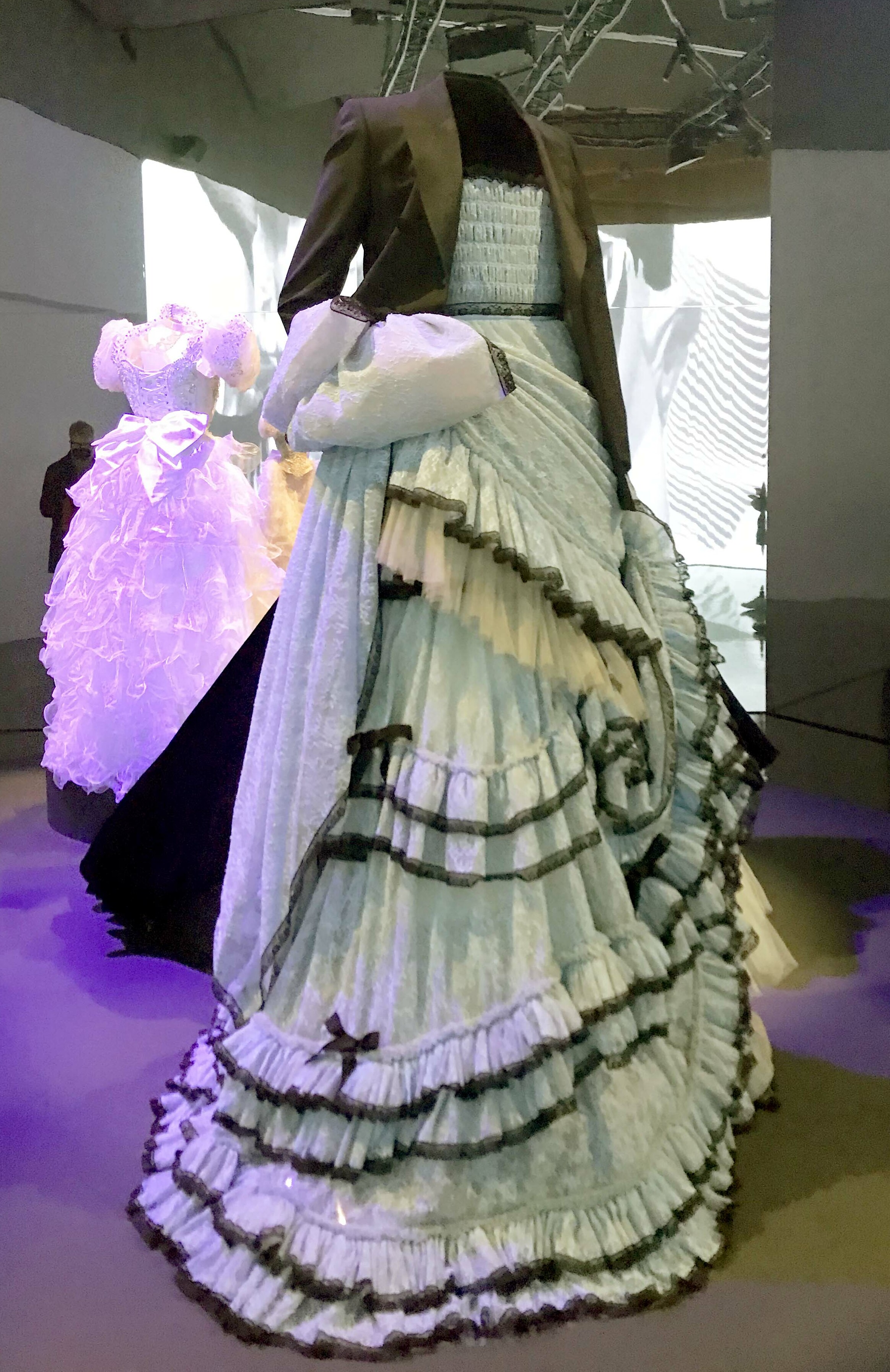
Blue Gucci dress worn by Styles on the cover of Vogue, Victoria and Albert Museum, 2022

In October 2021, Porter criticized Vogue for featuring English musician Harry Styles in a blue Gucci dress as their first male solo cover model. He felt selecting a "straight white man" to represent genderfluid fashion was inappropriate, saying that he "had to fight my entire life to get to the place where I could wear a dress to the Oscars and not be gunned down. All he has to do is be white and straight". Porter later apologized for bringing Styles into the conversation and said that his criticism was directed at "the systems of oppression and erasure of people of color who contribute to the culture" rather than Styles personally.

A photograph of the gown was featured at Gender Bending Fashion, a 2019 exhibit at the Museum of Fine Arts, Boston, along with other gender non-conforming fashion items such as a tuxedo worn by Marlene Dietrich in Morocco (1930). In 2022, the dress was featured in the show Fashioning Masculinities: The Art of Menswear at the Victoria and Albert Museum in London. It was displayed with a wedding dress worn by drag queen Bimini Bon-Boulash on the second series of RuPaul's Drag Race UK and the blue Gucci dress that Styles wore on the cover of Vogue.

Porter attended the 80th Golden Globe Awards in 2023 as a presenter, wearing a fuchsia pink velvet tuxedo gown also by Siriano. He presented the Carol Burnett Award to his friend Ryan Murphy, with whom he had worked on Pose. In his acceptance speech, Murphy explained that he had asked Porter to wear the original tuxedo gown again, and Porter replied, "Bitch, it’s in a museum". Siriano created a new tuxedo gown for him to wear instead.

== See also ==
- List of individual dresses
- Queer fashion
