= The Daughters of Edward Darley Boit =

Painting by John Singer Sargent

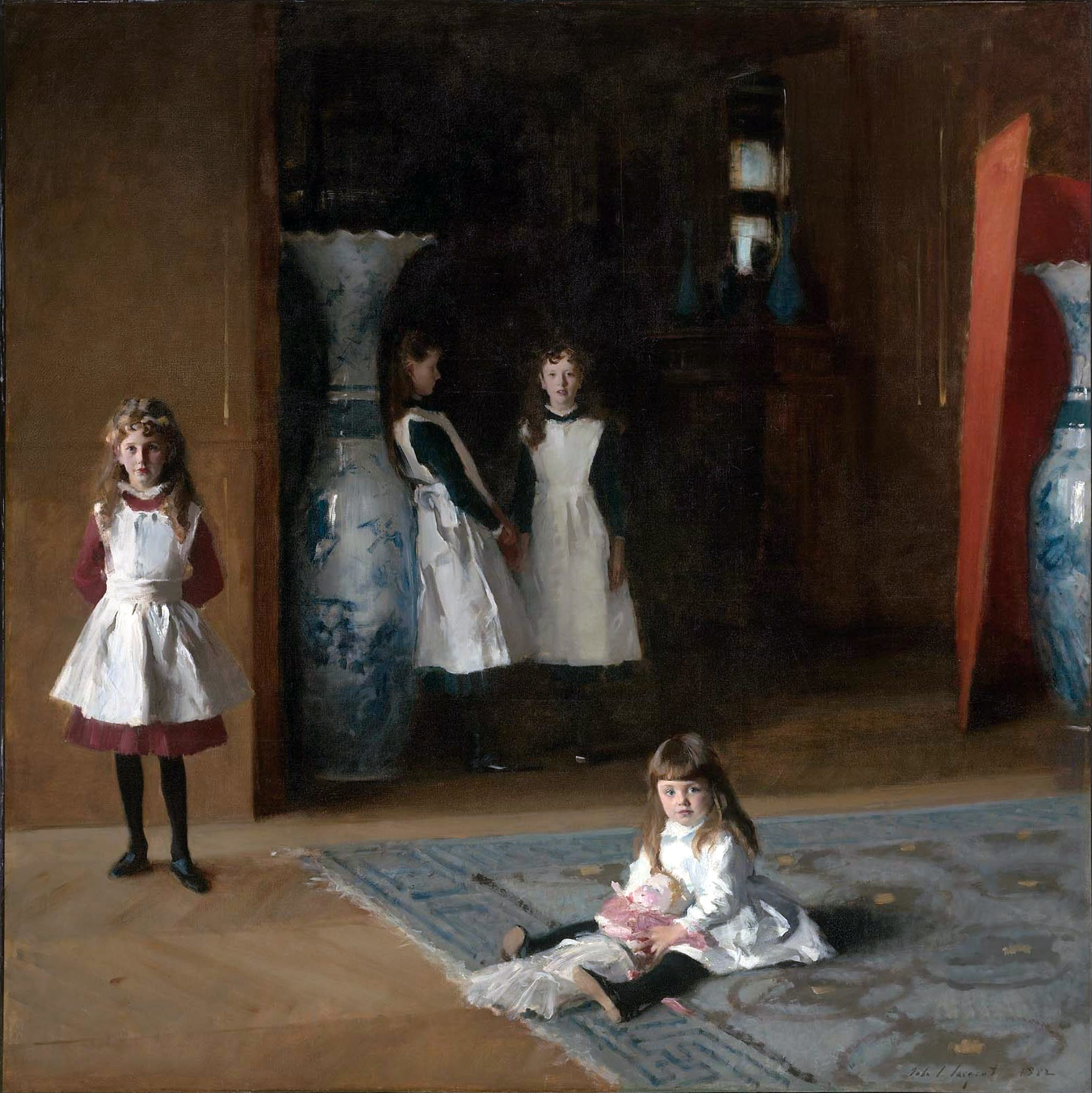
- Artist: John Singer Sargent
- Year: 1882
- Medium: Oil on canvas
- Dimensions: 222.5 cm × 222.5 cm (87.6 in × 87.6 in)
- Location: Museum of Fine Arts, Boston

The Daughters of Edward Darley Boit (originally titled Portraits d'enfants) is a painting by the American artist John Singer Sargent. The painting depicts four young girls, the daughters of Edward Darley Boit, in their family's Paris apartment. It was painted in 1882 and is now exhibited in the Art of the Americas Wing of the Museum of Fine Arts in Boston. The painting hangs between the two tall blue-and-white Japanese vases depicted in the work, which were donated by the heirs of the Boit family.

It has been described as "arguably the most psychologically compelling painting of Sargent's career". Though the painting's unusual composition was noted from its earliest viewings, initially its subject was interpreted simply as that of girls at play, but it has subsequently been viewed in more abstract terms, reflecting Freudian analysis and a greater interest in the ambiguities of adolescence.

Edward Boit was the son-in-law of John Perkins Cushing and a friend of Sargent's. Boit was an "American cosmopolite" and a minor painter. His wife and the mother of his five children was Mary Louisa Cushing, known as "Isa". Their four daughters were Florence, Jane, Mary Louisa and Julia.

== Composition ==
It is not certain whether The Daughters of Edward Darley Boit was commissioned by Boit or painted at Sargent's suggestion. Set in what is thought to be the foyer of Boit's Paris apartment, its dark interior space is reminiscent of those Sargent had recently painted in Venice. The composition was unusual for a group portrait, both for the varying degrees of prominence given to the figures—conventional group portraiture called for an arrangement in which the subjects were portrayed as equally important—and for the square shape of the canvas.

The dimensions may owe something to the influence of Diego Velázquez's Las Meninas, which Sargent had copied, and which presages the geometric format and broad, deep spaces of Sargent's painting. When the painting was first exhibited, contemporary critics, including Henry James, wrote of Sargent's debt to Velázquez.

The work of Diego Velázquez in general, and Las Meninas in particular, influenced Sargent's composition.

Art historian Barbara Gallati notes that the English translation of Las Meninas, "Maids-in-Waiting", is an apt description for the activity of the Boit children. Carolus-Duran, Sargent's teacher, had encouraged his students to study the work of Velázquez. The relationship between the works is considered so significant that the Museum of Fine Arts (Boston) lent The Daughters to the Museo del Prado in 2010, so that the paintings could be exhibited together for the first time. In a display of Sargent’s work at the Metropolitan in 2025, this work was paired with Sargent’s copy of Velázquez’s masterpiece.

The brushwork of several passages has been seen as deriving from Frans Hals, and nearly contemporaneous works that have been cited for their similarities are Madame Georges Charpentier and Her Children by Pierre-Auguste Renoir and, especially for its psychological complexity, The Bellelli Family by Edgar Degas.

Dressed in white pinafores, the children are arranged so that the youngest, four-year-old Julia, sits on the floor, eight-year-old Mary Louisa stands at left, and the two oldest, Jane, aged twelve, and Florence, fourteen, stand in the background, partially obscured by shadow.

In very nearly hiding one of the girl's faces and subjugating the characterization of individuals to more formal compositional considerations, The Daughters of Edward Darley Boit is as much about the subject of childhood as it is an example of portraiture.

== Interpretation ==
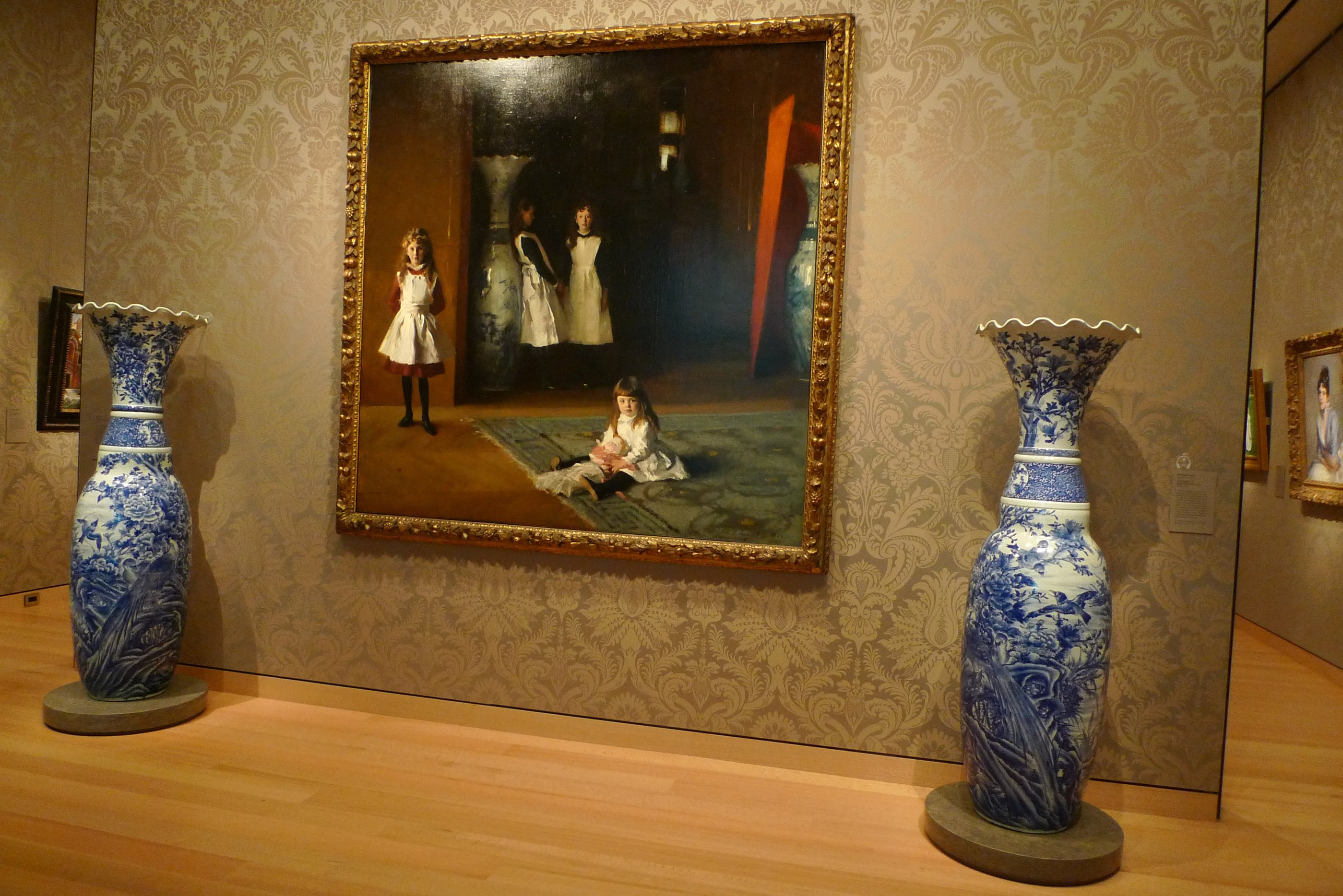
The painting on display, flanked by the original vases.

When the painting was first exhibited in Paris in 1882 and 1883, critics were struck by the oddness of the composition and "wooden forms" of the figures. In 1887, Henry James described the painting as representing a "happy play-world ... of charming children;" his uncomplicated reading went largely unchallenged for nearly a century. Much modern criticism has interpreted unsettling qualities in the painting, seen as both beautifully painted and psychologically unnerving, in which the girls appear to be seen at successive phases of childhood, retreating into alienation and a loss of innocence as they grow older.

While today's audiences have sometimes assumed that the girls are engaged in some sort of clandestine activity, in Sargent's day the most frequent notion was that they had simply been playing. The pinafores were certainly appropriate garments for girls at play, and the majority of writers who discussed the painting when it was first displayed characterized it as an image of children participating in or having just finished a game.

Gallati has suggested that the placement of the two oldest girls, at the edge of a darkened and ambiguous entryway, is symbolic of their maturation into an unknown future. Several art historians have interpreted the painting as revealing Sargent's psychosexual thoughts. In the succeeding years, none of the girls would marry, and the two oldest suffered emotional disturbances in maturity.

In 1919, the four sisters gave the painting to the Museum of Fine Arts, Boston, in memory of their father.

Author Bill Brown has commented on what he calls the "uncanny qualities" of the depiction of the girls and the vases, which he asserts promote "an indeterminate ontology [because of] the inability to distinguish between the animate and the inanimate." Brown claims that the painting offers a portrait of vases and a still life of the girls, and that this "discloses a dialectic of person and thing."

== See also ==
- List of works by John Singer Sargent
