= Marguerite Charpentier =

French salon-holder and art collector

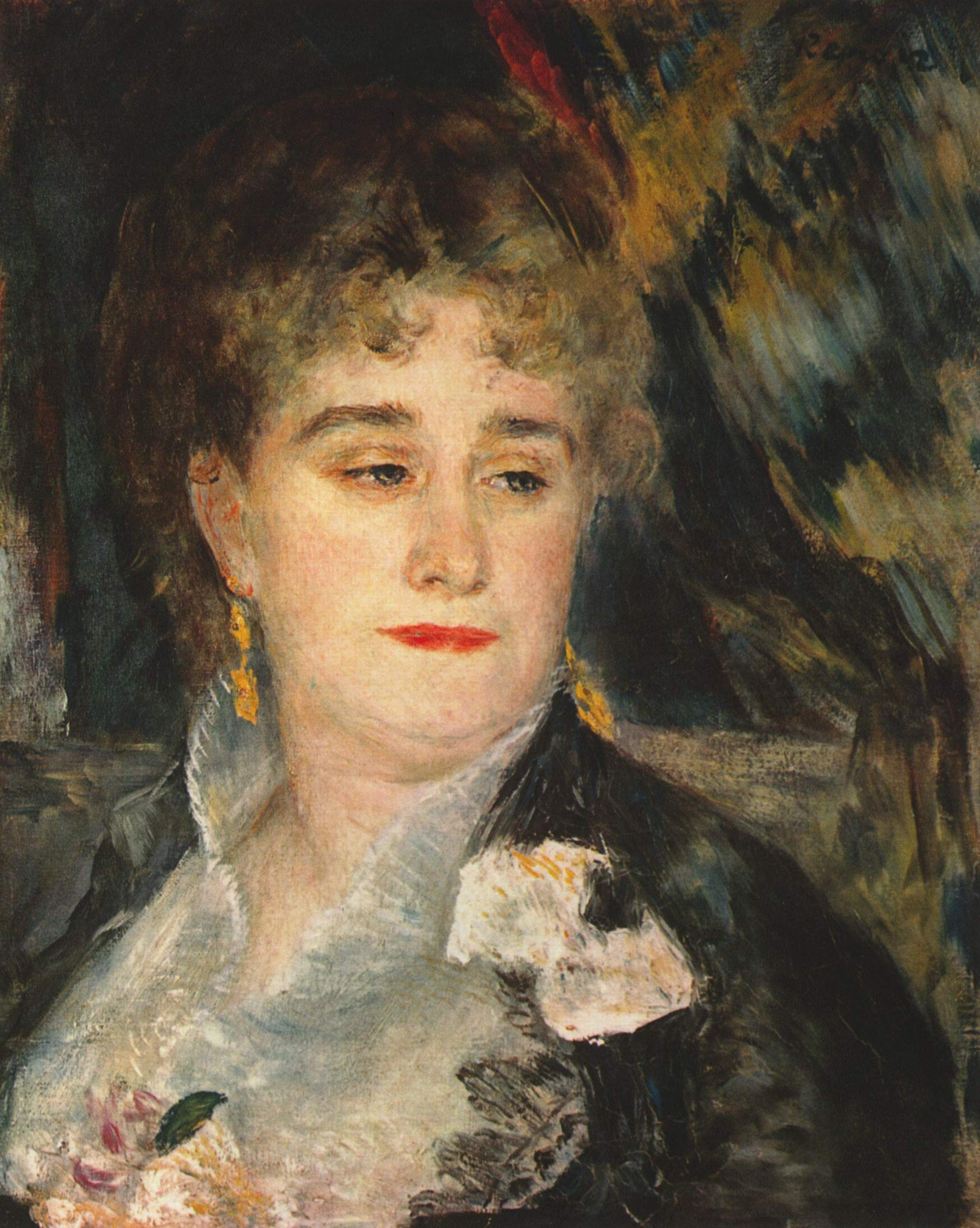
Pierre-Auguste Renoir, Mme Charpentier, c. 1876.

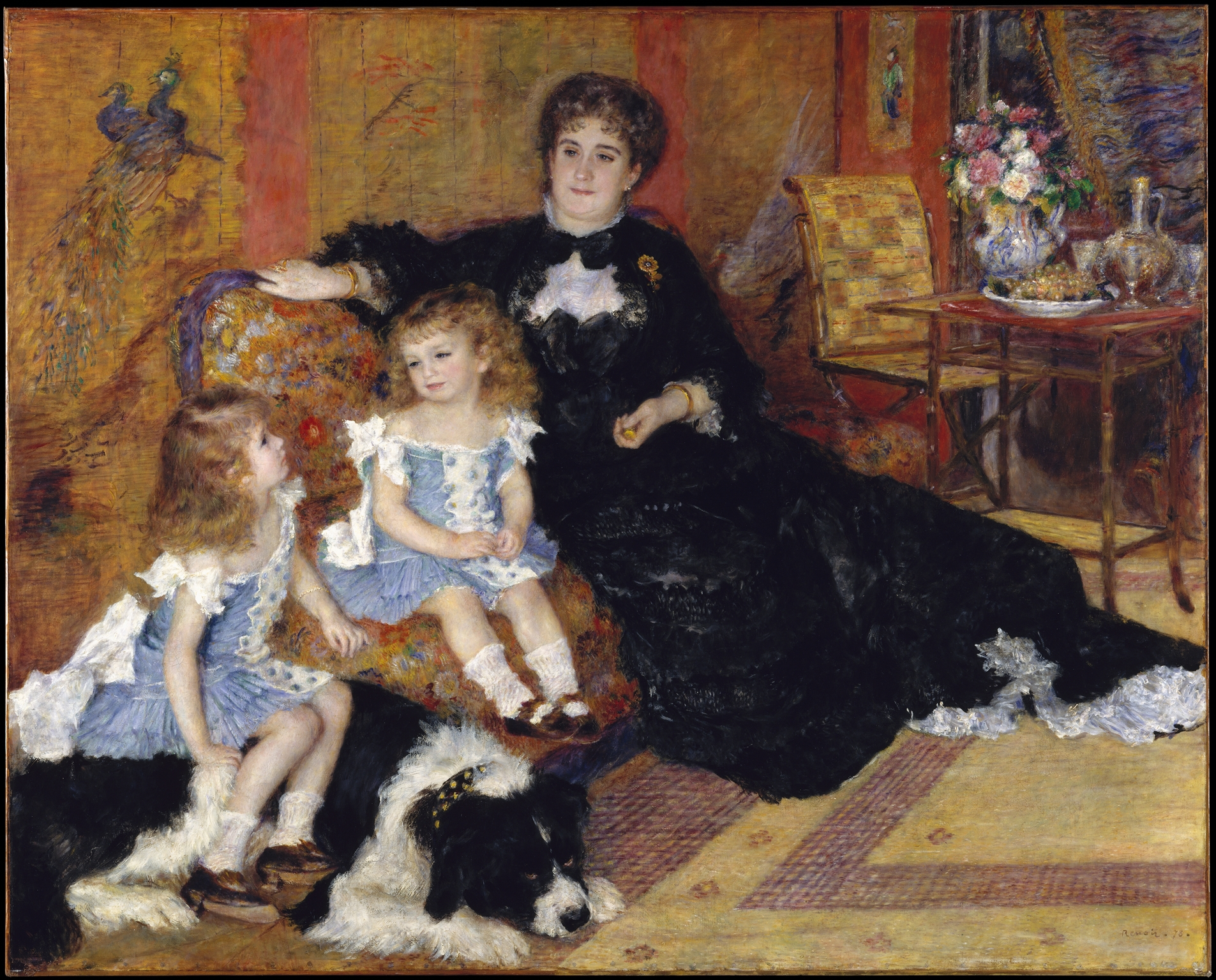
Pierre-Auguste Renoir, Madame Georges Charpentier and Her Children, 1878. The children in this painting are Georgette and Paul.

Marguerite Charpentier (1 March 1848 – 30 November 1904) was a French salonist and art collector, who was one of the earliest champions of the Impressionists.

== Biography ==
She was born Marguerite Louise Lemonnier in Paris to Alexandre-Gabriel Lemonnier, the court jeweler, and Sophie Raymonde (née Duchâtenet). In 1871, she married the publisher Georges Charpentier and they had four children: Georgette, Marcel, Paul, and Jeanne.

On Fridays from the mid 1870s to the early 1890s, Charpentier ran a political and literary salon at her house to which she invited writers, artists, musicians, actors, and politicians. Among those who attended were writers represented by her husband, including Gustave Flaubert, Alphonse Daudet, Guy de Maupassant, Théodore de Banville, Joris-Karl Huysmans, and Émile Zola. Artists who came ranged from traditional realists like Carolus-Duran and Jean-Jacques Henner to Impressionists such as Édouard Manet, Claude Monet, Edgar Degas, Alfred Sisley, Gustave Caillebotte, and Pierre-Auguste Renoir. Other visitors included the art critic Théodore Duret, the art collector Charles Ephrussi, the composers Camille Saint-Saëns and Jules Massenet, and the actor Sarah Bernhardt.

Charpentier and her husband amassed a small but significant collection of paintings, mostly by French Impressionist painters. In 1875, Charpentier acquired three Impressionist paintings by Renoir, making her one of the first art collectors to buy Impressionist work. Renoir executed half a dozen commissioned portraits of Charpentier and her family, and even described himself at one point as the Charpentiers' "private painter". His 1878 portrait of Charpentier and two of her children was acclaimed at the 1879 Paris Salon, and the writer Marcel Proust refers to this painting in the last volume of his novel cycle In Search of Lost Time.

In the early 1880s, Georges Charpentier's publishing firm ran into financial difficulties and the Charpentiers were forced to sell off part of the art collection.

After Marguerite Charpentier died in 1904 and Georges in 1905, their surviving children auctioned the remainder of the art collection. Some of it is now in major museums, including the Musée d'Orsay and the Metropolitan Museum of Art.

== Works in the Charpentier collection ==
- Paul Cézanne, Marion and Valabregue in Search of a Motif to Paint (1866)
- Edouard Manet, The Battle of the Kearsarge and the Alabama (1864)
- Claude Monet, Les glaçons (The Ice Floes, 1880)
- Pierre-Auguste Renoir, Le Pêcheur à la ligne (1874)
- Pierre-Auguste Renoir, Mlle Georgette Charpentier (1876)
- Pierre-Auguste Renoir, Mme Georges Charpentier and Her Children (1878)
- Pierre-Auguste Renoir, Mme Charpentier (c. 1876)
- Pierre-Auguste Renoir, Paul Charpentier (1877)
- Pierre-Auguste Renoir, Portrait of a Man (Monsieur Charpentier) (1878)

== Sources ==
This page is in part a translation from de:Marguerite Charpentier. Sources on that page include:

- Distel, Anne (1990). Impressionism : the first collectors. New York. ISBN 0-8109-3160-5. OCLC 20566765.
- De Goncourt, Edmond. Journal des Goncourt, vol. 5 (1872–1877). Paris: Bibliothèque-Charpentier, 1891. (in French)
- Kostenevič, Alʹbert G. (1995). Aus der Eremitage verschollene Meisterwerke deutscher Privatsammlungen (in German). München: Kindler. ISBN 978-3-463-40278-9. OCLC 231644871.
- MacQuillan, Melissa (1986). Porträtmalerei der französischen Impressionisten (in German). Rosenheim. ISBN 978-3-475-52508-7. OCLC 241826035.
- Proust, Marcel (1927). Le Temps Retrouvé (in French). Paris: Gallimard.
- Robida, Michel. Le Salon Charpentier et les impressionistes. Paris: Bibliothèque des arts, 1958. (in French)
