= Émile Bergerat =

French poet, playwright, essayist (1845–1923)

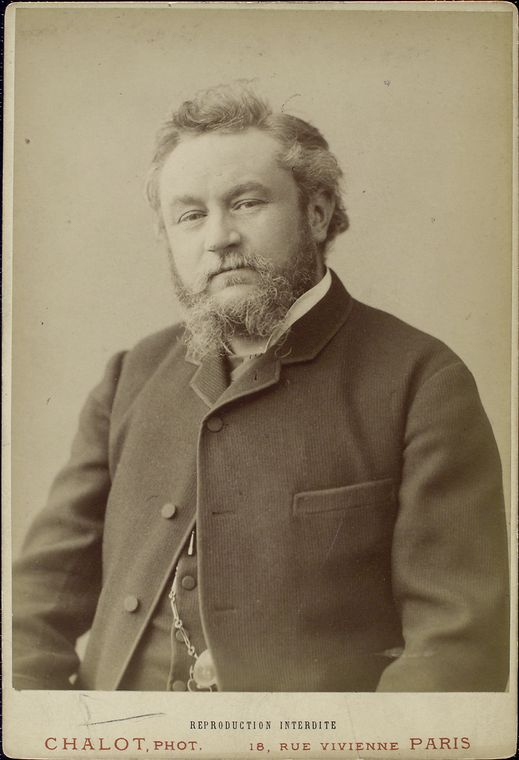
Émile Bergerat early in his career.

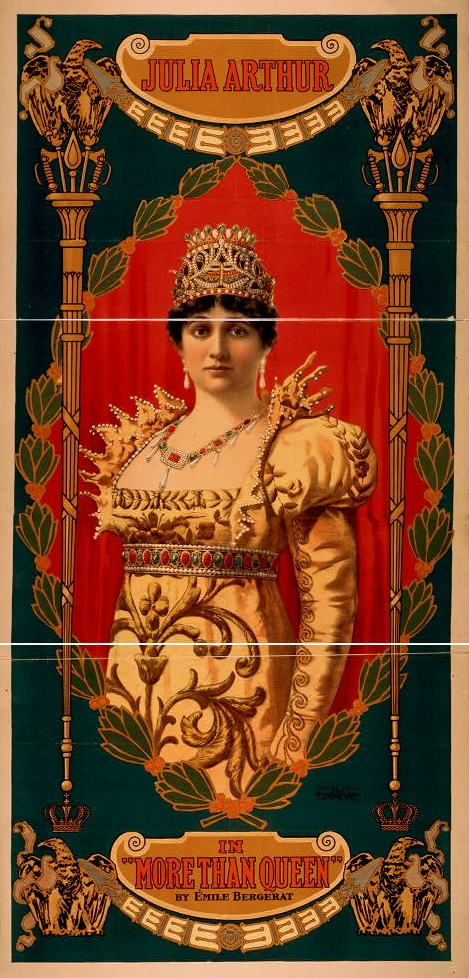
Poster for More Than Queen, the Broadway production of Bergerat's play Plus que Reine in New York City in 1899.

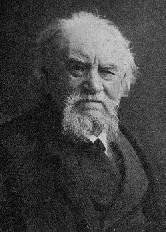
Émile Bergerat

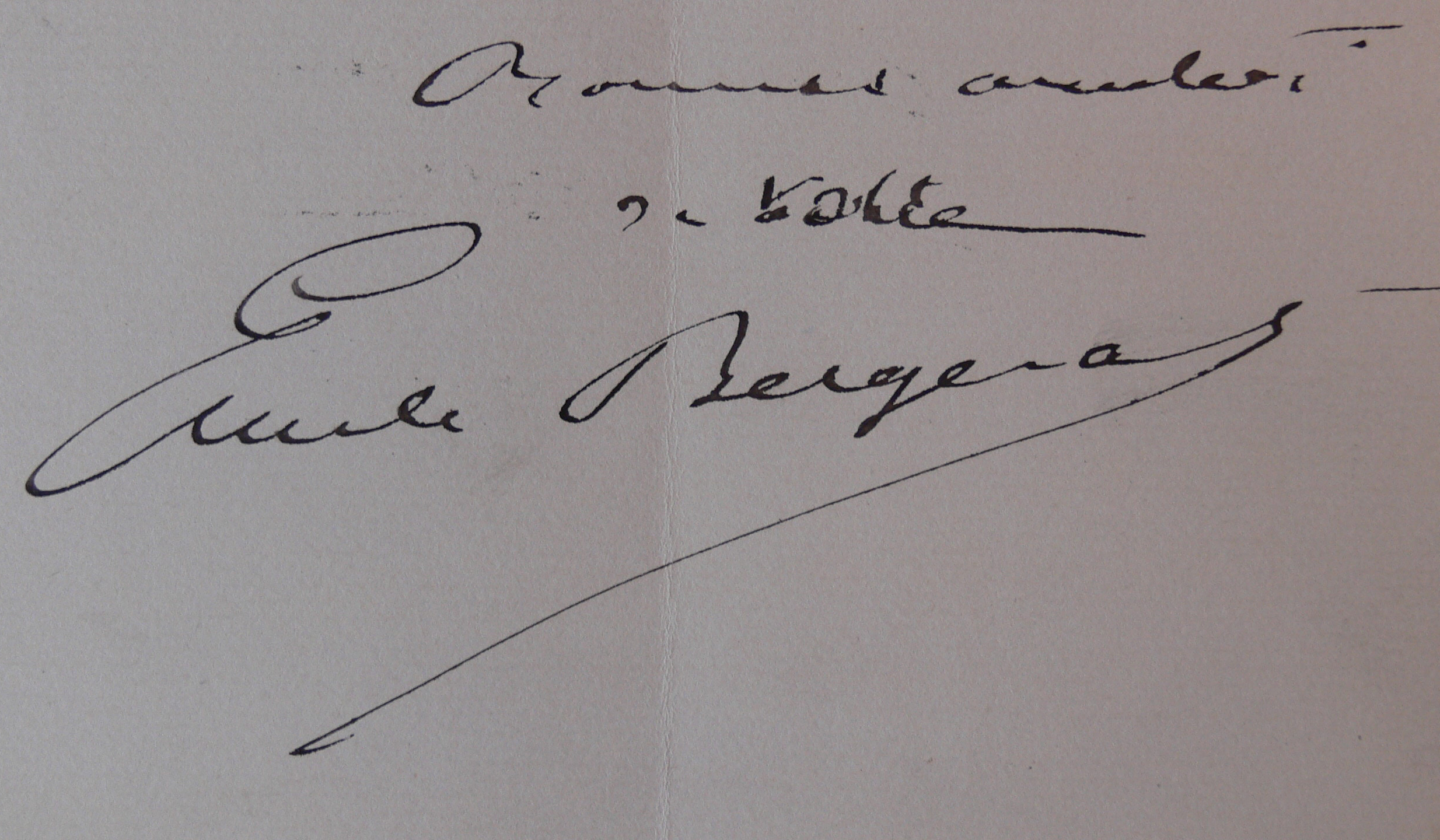
Signature of Émile Bergerat

Émile Bergerat (29 April 1845 – 13 October 1923) was a French poet, playwright and essayist. He used the pseudonyms l'Homme masqué (the masked man), Caliban and Ariel (the latter two drawn from The Tempest by William Shakespeare). A library in Neuilly-sur-Seine opposite his flat bears his name.

== Life ==
Bergerat was born in Paris. An essayist for Voltaire and Figaro, head of the La Vie moderne review under the editorship of Georges Charpentier and a member of the Académie Goncourt, he was the son in law of Théophile Gautier and the brother in law of Théophile Gautier (fils). Émile Bergerat married Estelle Gautier, daughter of Théophile Gautier, and they had one son, Théo Bergerat, director and radio essayist. Théophile wrote in a letter to Carlotta Grisi that Émile was

a young poet who wrote Les Cuirassiers de Reichshoffen, a verse play about battle, which was an immense success during the siege [of Paris] and which was then re-produced throughout France - not only is he a poet, but he writes very well in prose and his work is certain and regular. He is also the most fervent admirer of mine and we work side by side, on the same journal, at the Bien Public

Bergerat died in Neuilly-sur-Seine, aged 78.

== Works ==
- Les cuirassiers de Reichshoffen (Lemerre, 1871)
- A. Chateaudun (Lemerre, 1871)
- Poèmes de la guerre 1870-1871 (1871)
- Les Provinciales (1871)
- Peintures décoratives de Paul Baudry au grand foyer de l'Opéra, critical study, preface by Théophile Gautier (1875)
- Théophile Gautier, peintre : étude, suivie du Catalogue de son œuvre peint, dessiné et gravé (1877)
- Théophile Gautier. Entretiens, souvenirs et correspondance (Charpentier, 1879)
- Enguerrande, dramatic poem (1884)
- Bébé et Cie (1884)
- Le Viol (Ollendorff, 1885)
- Vie et aventures du sieur Caliban. 1884-85 (1886)
- Le Livre de Caliban (Lemerre, 1887)
- Le Petit Moreau, novel (1887)
- Figarismes de Caliban (Lemerre, 1888)
- L'Amour en République, étude sociologique, 1870-1889 (1889)
- Le Cruel Vaten-guerre, mémoires d'un grand homme, recueillis, orthographiés et mis en un beau désordre par Caliban. Çi est le premier livre, intitulé la Bataille du Gravase (1889)
- Le Rire de Caliban (Charpentier, 1890)
- La Chasse au mouflon, ou Petit Voyage philosophique en Corse (Delagrave, 1891)
- L'Espagnole (Conquet, 1891)
- Les Chroniques de l'homme masqué (1892)
- Les Soirées de Calibangrève (1892)
- Le Salon de 1892 : Champs-Élysées (1892)
- Le Faublas malgré lui (1893)
- Les Drames de l'honneur. Le Chèque, novel (1893)
- Les Drames de l'honneur. La Vierge, novel (1894)
- Faublas malgré lui (1903)
- Contes de Caliban (1909)
- Ballades et sonnets (1910)
- Les Amours de Violette, roman (1910)
- Les Contes facitieux (1910)
- Souvenirs d'un enfant de Paris (4 volumes, 1911–1913)
- Glanes et javelles, rimes nouvelles, 1910-1914 (1914)
- Trente-six contes de toutes les couleurs (1919)

=== Plays ===
- Une Amie, 1-act verse comedy, Paris, Théâtre-Français, 9 September 1865
- Père et mari, 3-act prose drama, Paris, théâtre de Cluny, 21 June 1870
- Séparés de corps, 1-act prose comedy, Paris, théâtre du Vaudeville, 11 March 1874
- La Nuit bergamasque, 3-act tragi-comedy, Paris, théâtre-Libre, 30 May 1887
- Le Premier Baiser, 1-act play, Paris, Comédie-Française, 20 May 1889
- Le Capitaine Fracasse, heroic comedy in 5 acts and 7 tableaux, d'après le roman de Théophile Gautier, Paris, théâtre de l'Odéon, 10 October 1896
- La Burgonde, opera in 4 acts and 5 tableaux, with Camille de Sainte-Croix, music by Paul Vidal, Paris, Théâtre de l'Opéra, 23 December 1898; publié chez Choudens, 1898
- Plus que Reine, 5-act drama, with prologue and 7 tableaux, Paris, théâtre de la Porte-Saint-Martin, 28 March 1899
- Théâtre (6 volumes, 1899)
- La Pompadour, dramatic comedy in 7 tableaux, 1 prologue, 5 acts and 1 epilogue, Paris, théâtre de la Porte-Saint-Martin, 6 November 1901
- Le Capitaine Blomet, 3-act comedy, Paris, théâtre Antoine, 3 December 1901
- Petite mère, 4-act comedy, Paris, théâtre du Vaudeville, 29 April 1903
- La Fontaine de Jouvence, 2-act verse mythological comedy, Paris, Comédie-Française, 4 July 1906
- Vidocq, empereur des policiers, comedy in 5 acts and 7 tableaux, Paris, théâtre Sarah Bernhardt, 15 May 1910
- L'Héritage d'Œdipe, verse comedy in 2 acts and 1 prologue, presented to and refused by the Comédie-Française, 5 May 1911
- La Nuit florentine, 4-act verse comedy, whose prologue is a free adaptation of La Mandragore by Machiavelli, Paris, théâtre de l'Odéon, 20 February 1913
