= Georges Charpentier =

French publisher and journalist

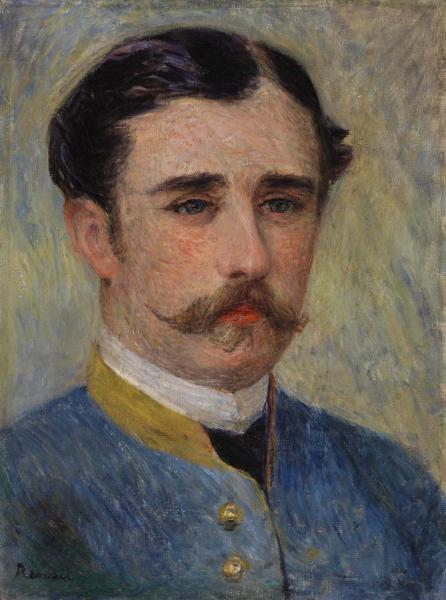
Piere-Auguste Renoir, Portrait of a Man (Monsieur Charpentier), 1878.

Georges Charpentier (December 22, 1846 - November 15, 1905) was a 19th-century French publisher who became known as a champion of naturalist writers, especially Émile Zola, Gustave Flaubert, and Guy de Maupassant. He also promoted Impressionist painters and together with his wife, Marguerite Charpentier, built a small but significant art collection.

== Publishing house ==
Georges Charpentier was the son of Gervais Charpentier, a French bookseller and publisher. After spending a few years a journalist, he took over his father's publishing house, Bibliothèque Charpentier, in 1872 and began to publish adventurous contemporary authors, especially those known as proponents of naturalism. Besides Zola, Flaubert, and de Maupassant, his firm's author list included Joris-Karl Huysmans, Edmond de Goncourt, and (continuing from his father's day) Théophile Gautier.

In 1876 he created the Petite Bibliothèque Charpentier, a line of affordable editions illustrated with etchings that were targeted at bibliophiles.

Despite the success of Zola's and Flaubert's books in the mid 1870s, Charpentier's firm ran into financial difficulties. This state of affairs worsened when Charpentier launched a new illustrated newspaper, La Vie moderne (1879-1883) with Émile Bergerat as managing editor and Pierre-Auguste Renoir as one of the illustrators. In 1883–84, Charles Marpon and Ernest Flammarion acquired a three-quarters interest in the firm. As more changes of ownership took place over the next decade, the firm's publications declined in number and authors moved on to other publishers.

== Art collection ==
Charpentier's wife, Marguerite, was a salonist whose Friday salons drew writers, artists, actors, musicians and politicians to their house. The Charpentiers were champions of Impressionism and began buying Impressionist painting in the mid 1870s. They gave a number of portrait commissions to Renoir, who in the course of the decade painted all of the family members. Renoir's portrait of Georges, Portrait of a Man (Monsieur Charpentier), painted in 1878, is in the collection of the Barnes Foundation.

== Praise from contemporaries ==
"[Georges Charpentier was] created for the word 'sympathetic', unless the word was invented for him". (Guy de Maupassant)

"He had the audacity to bring us in as other doors closed before us. I speak especially for myself, who was repulsed everywhere". (Émile Zola)

"[He] had the courage to welcome the first young authors of the so-called naturalist school, and he was well rewarded since he is the editor of Mr. Zola". (Jules Lermina)

== Sources ==
This page is translated in part from fr:Georges Charpentier. Sources on that page include:

- Robida, Michel. Le Salon Charpentier et les Impressionnistes. Bibliothèque des arts, 1958 (in French)
- Becker, Colette. Trente années d'amitié : 1872-1902: Lettres de l'éditeur Georges Charpentier à Émile Zola. Presses universitaires de France, 1980. ISBN 978-2130366966. (in French)
- Meyer, Virginie. "La maison Charpentier de 1875 à 1896 d'un catalogue à l'autre", in: Annie Charon, Claire Lesage and Ève Netchine, eds., Le Livre entre le commerce et l'histoire des idées: Les catalogues de libraires (XVe-XIXe siècle), Paris: Publications de l’École nationale des chartes, 2011 (Études et rencontres, 33)
- Serrepuy-Meyer, Virginie. "Georges Charpentier (1846-1905): Éditeur de romans, roman d’un éditeur". Dissertation, École des chartes, 2005. (in French)
- Serrepuy-Meyer, Virginie. "Georges Charpentier, le plus parisien des éditeurs". In Histoire et civilisation du livre. Genève: Droz, 2009. (in French)
