= Octember =

Octember may refer to:

- Please Try to Remember the First of Octember!, a book by Dr. Seuss
- The Ides of Octember, the original planned name for Roger Zelazny's The Dream Master
- Octember Variations, an album by Mild Maniac Orchestra
- Octember Revolution, a documentary by Kevin Moore

== See also ==
- September (disambiguation)
- October (disambiguation)
- November (disambiguation)
