= Joan of Arc (painting) =

Painting by Jules Bastien-Lepage

- Jeanne d'Arc (French)
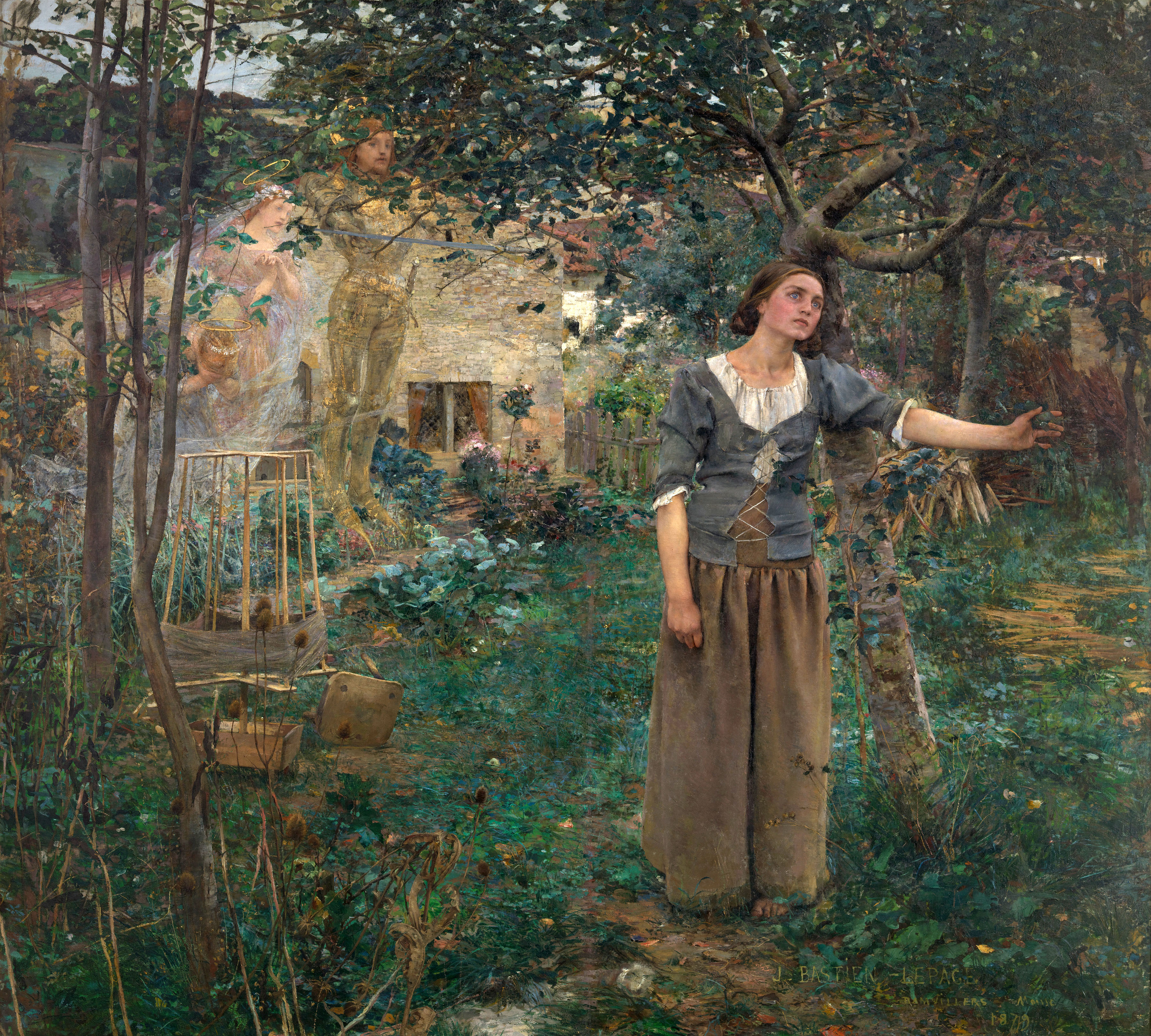
- Artist: Jules Bastien-Lepage
- Year: 1879
- Medium: Oil on canvas
- Subject: Joan of Arc's visions
- Dimensions: 254 x 279.4 cm
- Location: Metropolitan Museum of Art, New York

Joan of Arc (French: Jeanne d'Arc) is an oil on canvas painting by Jules Bastien-Lepage, from 1879. It was exhibited at the Exposition Universelle in Paris in 1889. It is held in the Metropolitan Museum of Art, in New York.

== History ==
Joan of Arc, a national hero of France following the Hundred Years' War, became an increasingly important figure in the French cultural scene during the 1870s and 1880s, following the country's defeat in the Franco-Prussian War. That conflict had seen Prussia annex the eastern part of Lorraine, the region both Joan of Arc and Bastien-Lepage were born in.

Bastien-Lepage completed the painting in 1879, and after being exhibited at the Salon in 1880, it was purchased by American businessman Erwin Davis.

== Description ==
The painting depicts the moment the saints Catherine of Alexandria, Margaret the Virgin, and the archangel Michael appeared to Joan of Arc in her parents' garden in Domrémy, urging her to fight the English. Bastien-Lepage visited Domrémy in preparation for creating the painting; the village was near to his own birthplace, Damvillers. His cousin, Marie-Adèle Robert, has been identified as the model for Joan; she previously modelled for other Bastien-Lepage paintings.

Critics at the Salon of 1880 where the painting was first exhibited praise Bastien-Lepage's use of Joan's pose and facial expression to demonstrate her spiritual awakening, though found the inclusion of the saints as being contrary to his usual naturalistic style; Joris-Karl Huysmans described it as "false naturalism". The response to the painting reportedly led to Bastien-Lepage fleeing Paris for London, abandoning a similarly styled painting of Ophelia.

Marie Bashkirtseff, an artist and contemporary of Bastien-Lepage, wrote in her diary about her outrage at the reception Joan of Arc received from French critics, accusing them of not properly appreciating it; she noted that the painting was properly "worshipped" in the USA.

== Bibliography ==
- Marie-Claude, Coudert (2003). "Fin de siècle". Jeanne d'Arc: les tableaux de l'histoire, 1820-1920 (in French). Paris: Réunion des Musées Nationaux. pp. 129–161. ISBN 2-7118-4682-2.
- Huguenaud, Karine (May–July 2012). "Jeanne d'Arc par Bastien-Lepage". Jeanne d'Arc et la guerre de Cent Ans (in French) (1): 38–41. ISSN 2260-4553.
- Talbert, Hailey; Kryger, Meir (January 3, 2025). "Narcolepsy in naturalism: Joan of Arc by Jules Bastien-Lepage". Sleep Health: Journal of the National Sleep Foundation. doi:10.1016/j.sleh.2024.12.008. ISSN 2352-7218.
