= October (painting) =

Painting by Jules Bastien-Lepage

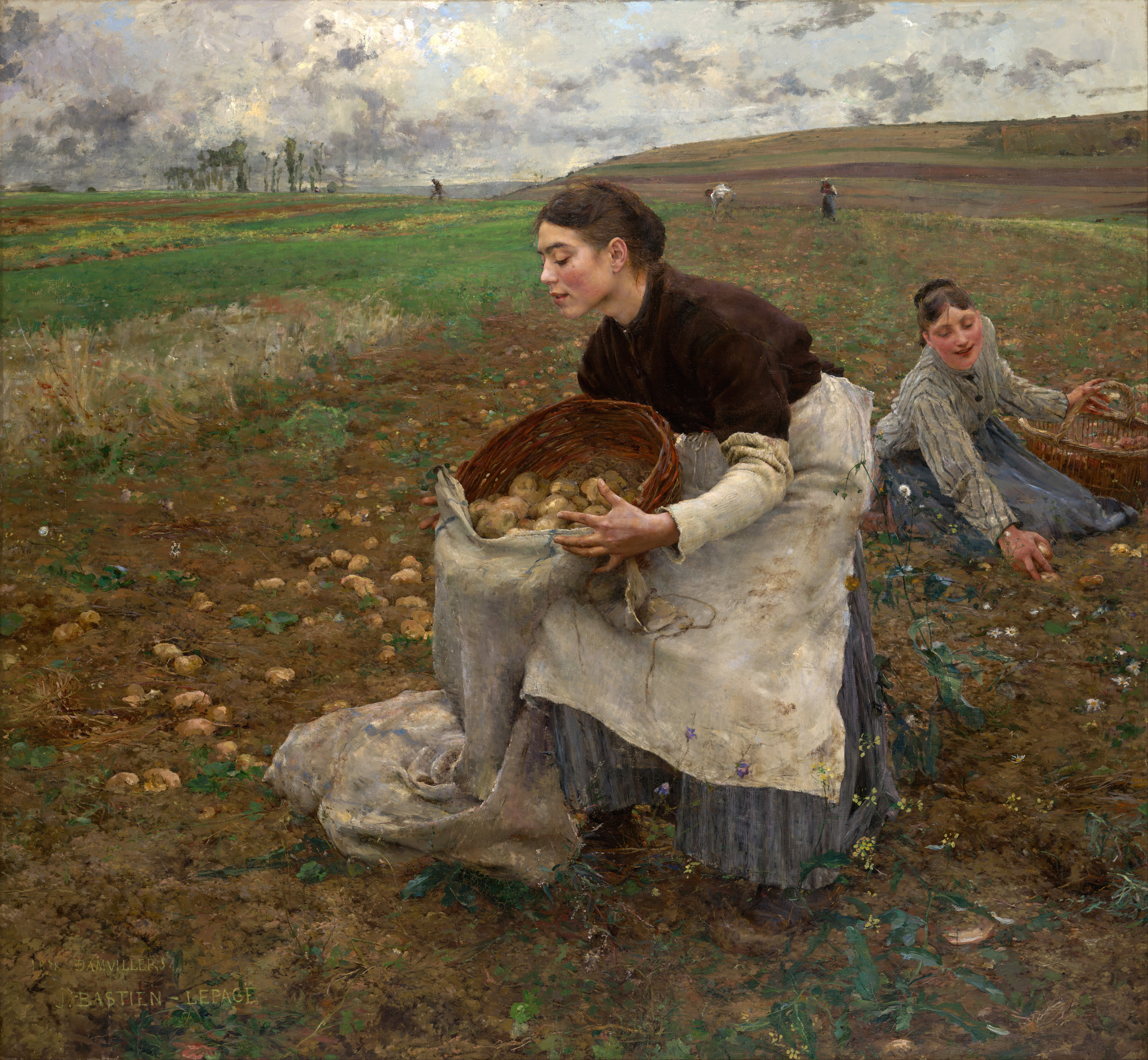
- Artist: Jules Bastien-Lepage
- Year: 1878
- Medium: Oil on canvas
- Dimensions: 180.7 × 196 cm
- Location: National Gallery of Victoria, Melbourne

October (French: Saison d'octobre) is an oil on canvas painting by French artist Jules Bastien-Lepage, from 1878. It is held at the National Gallery of Victoria, in Melbourne. It is also known as Picking Potatoes (French: Récolte des pommes de terre), The Potato Gatherers or Woman Gathering Potatoes.

== History and description ==
Bastien-Lepage painted it in his native village of Damvillers, whose name is written in the work's lower-left corner just above the artist's signature. It was first exhibited at the 1879 Paris Salon and the Russian painter Vasily Surikov saw it in Paris in December 1883, writing to his colleague Pavel Chistyakov at the end of that month:

I am now living in Paris. I came here to see a three-year exhibition of French paintings, at which I saw few things to excite one.... But, leaving all this behind, I want to talk about those few works that have true dignity. Take Bastien-Lepage's picture Woman Picking Potatoes. The face is both painted and written as living. Everything is written in the air. Reflexes, color, giving, everything is so whole, unbroken, that it is a miracle.

Vincent van Gogh was another admirer of the work, considering it a faithful depiction of French peasantry.

== Provenance ==
In 1885 (the year after the painter's death) it was acquired by his brother Émile Bastien-Lepage. Next it was acquired in 1897 by the Australian entrepreneur George McCulloch, who had moved to London in the early 1890s and started collecting paintings. After McCulloch's death in 1907, the painting passed to his widow Mary Coutts Michie. In October 1927 the painting was acquired by the Australian Felton Bequest Foundation, based on funds bequeathed by Alfred Felton and in 1928 it was transferred to its present owner.
