= Village Love =

1882 painting by Jules Bastien-Lepage

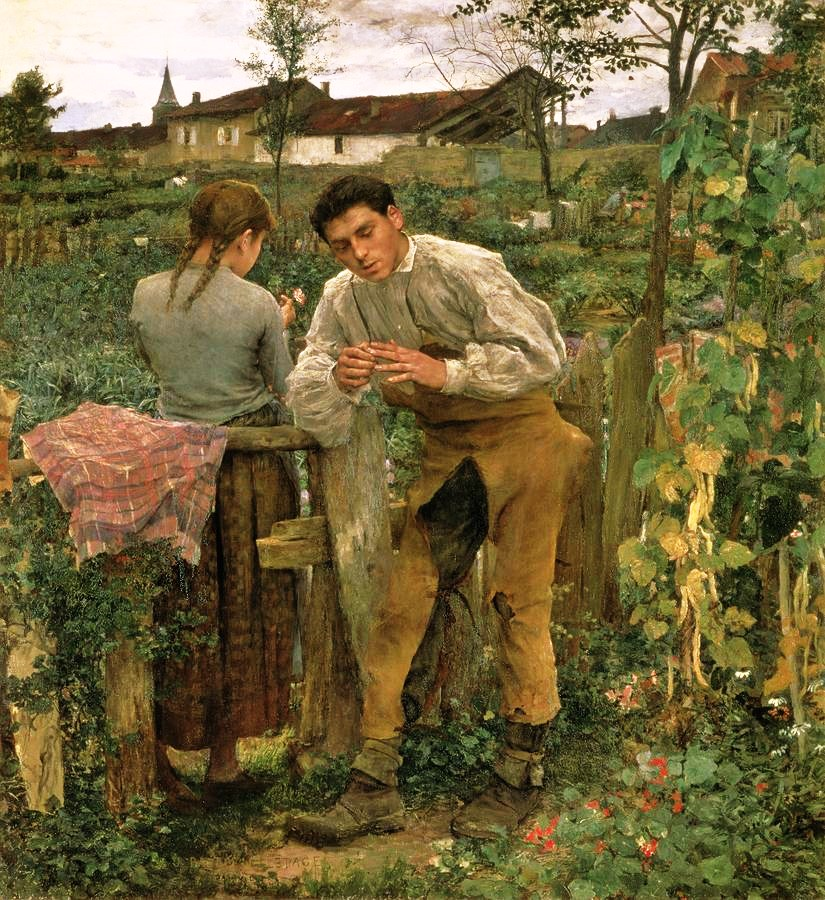
- Artist: Jules Bastien-Lepage
- Year: 1882
- Medium: Oil on canvas
- Dimensions: 194 x 180
- Location: Pushkin Museum, Moscow

Village Love or The Village Lovers (French - L'Amour au village) is an oil on canvas painting by Jules Bastien-Lepage, from 1882. It is held at the Pushkin Museum, in Moscow.

== History ==
It was acquired in 1885 by Russian art patron Sergei Tretyakov at the posthumous sale of the artist's works at Georges Petit's gallery, in Paris. The Musée du Luxembourg had initially been interested in the work, but instead chose Haymaking (later transferred to the Louvre then to the Musée d'Orsay). Village Love later entered the State Museum of New Western Art and the Pushkin Museum, in Moscow, in 1948 where it still hangs.

== Description ==
The painting depicts a young man and a young girl dressed in peasant fashion, standing next to each other, on either side of a wooden fence separating two plots of land. The young girl stands behind the fence, with her face not visible. She wears a long skirt, and her is hair styled in two braids. On the fence, she placed her scarf. The young man stands facing the viewers, leaning slightly so that his face is at the same level with that of the girl. He wears a light-colored shirt and his breeches are protected by a special apron. He seems embarrassed, possibly because he's talking about his love for her. The background consists of the church tower and facades of peasant houses. Towards the right, there is the silhouette of a woman working.

== Cultural references ==
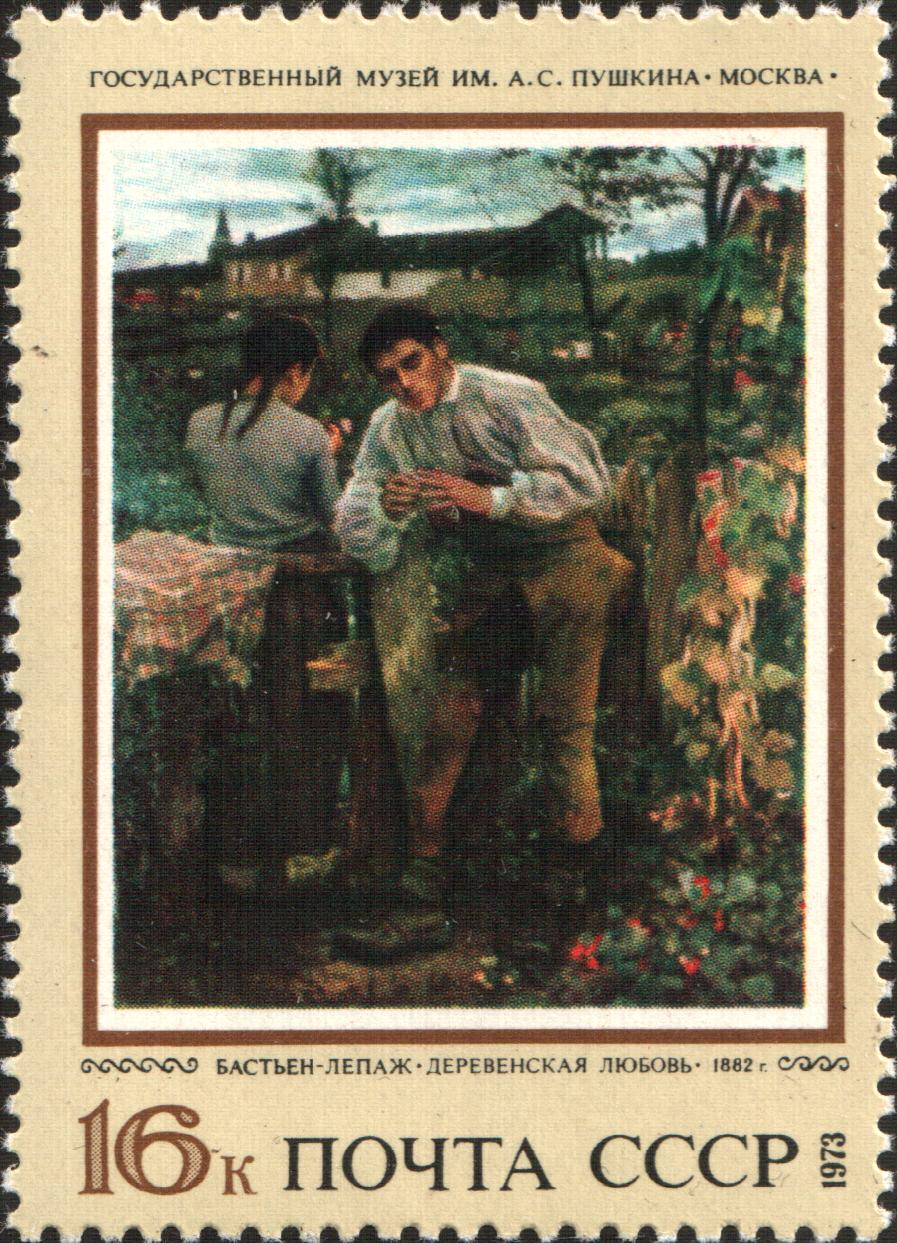
Soviet Union stamp with the painting

In 1973, the Soviet Ministry of Communications issued a postage stamp with the reproduction of the painting, the value of which was 16 kopecks.
