= Jules Bastien-Lepage =

French painter (1848–1884)

- Self-Portrait, c. 1880, Musée d'Orsay
- Born: 1 November 1848; Damvillers, Meuse, France
- Died: 10 December 1884 (aged 36); Paris, France
- Education: École des beaux-arts
- Known for: Painting
- Movement: Naturalism
- Honors: Prix de Rome (runner-up, 1875); Chevalier of the Legion of Honor, 1879; Knight of the Order of Leopold, 1883

Signature
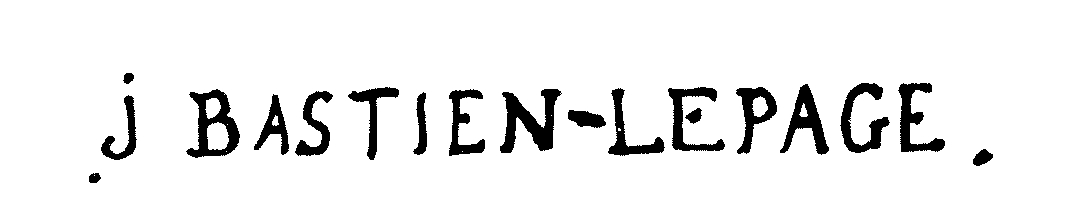

Jules Bastien-Lepage (1 November 1848 – 10 December 1884), or more informally Jules Bastien, was a French painter closely associated with the beginning of Naturalism, an artistic style that grew out of the Realist movement and developed in France alongside Impressionism. Émile Zola described Bastien-Lepage's work as "impressionism corrected, sweetened and adapted to the taste of the crowd."

His en plein air depictions of peasant life in the countryside were highly influential on many international artists, including George Clausen in England and Tom Roberts in Australia. He was also known for his history paintings, among the most famous being Joan of Arc, now in the Metropolitan Museum of Art in New York.

His younger brother Émile also became a painter, and an architect.

In 1882, Bastien-Lepage was diagnosed with testicular cancer. The tumor was removed, but his health steadily declined. After a spectacular but short-lived career, Jules Bastien-Lepage died of cancer in Paris in 1884 at the age of thirty-six.

== Life and work ==
Bastien-Lepage was born in the village of Damvillers, Meuse, and spent his childhood there. Bastien's father grew grapes in a vineyard to support the family. His grandfather also lived in the village; his garden had espaliered fruit trees of apple, pear, and peach up against the high walls. Bastien took an early liking to drawing, and his parents fostered his creativity by buying prints of paintings for him to copy.

Bastien's first teacher was his father, himself an artist. His first formal training was at Verdun. Prompted by a love of art, he went to Paris in 1867, where he was admitted to the École des Beaux-arts, working under Alexandre Cabanel. He was awarded first place for drawing, but spent most of his time working alone, only occasionally appearing in class. Nevertheless, he completed three years at the École.

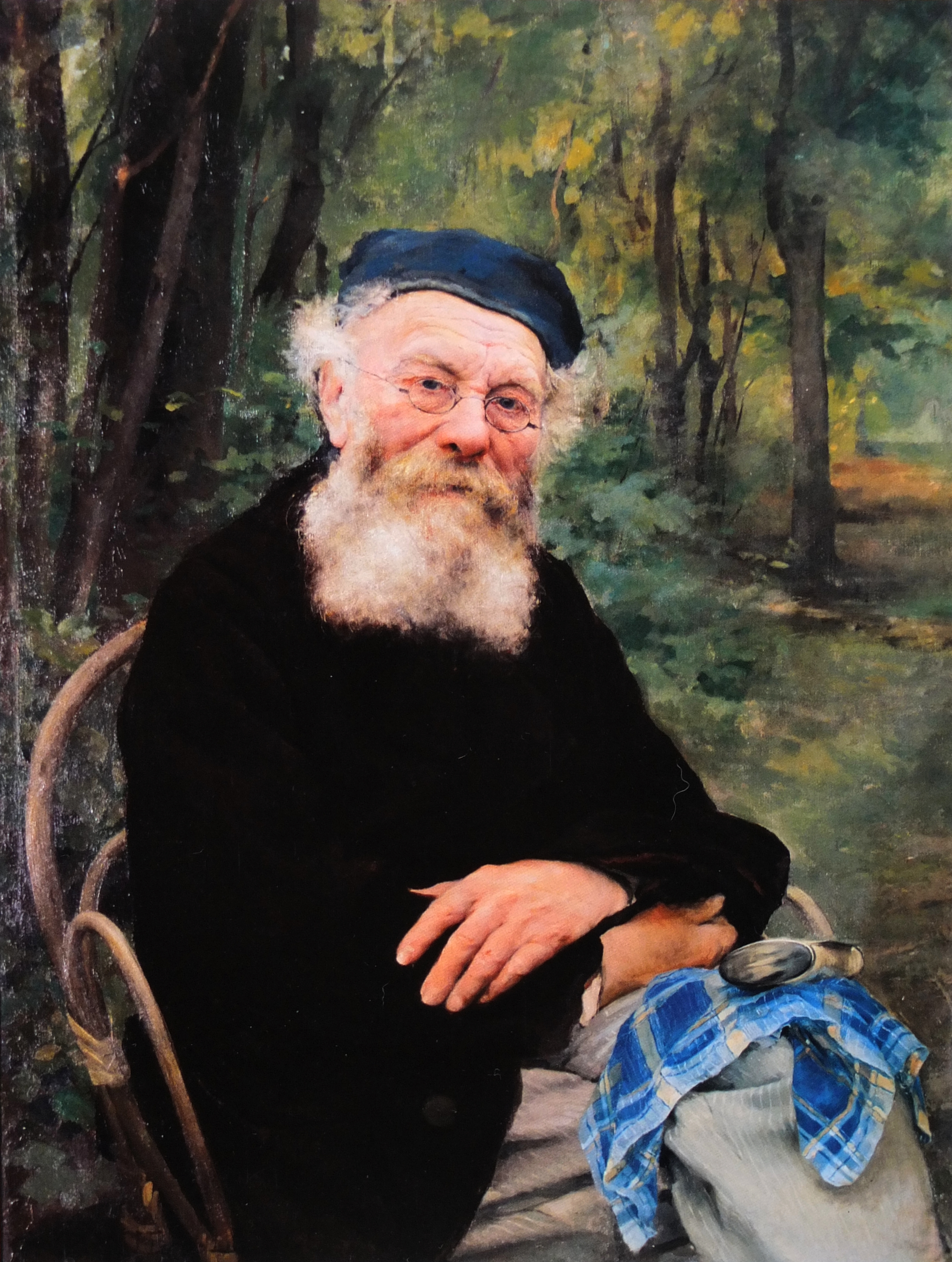
Son grand-père (The Artist's Grandfather), 1874, Musée d'Orsay

During the Franco-Prussian War in 1870, Bastien fought and was wounded. After the war, he returned home to recover and to paint the villagers of Damvillers. He debuted at the Paris Salon of 1870, but it was not until the Salon 1874, with his painting of his grandfather in the garden, that he scored a critical success and received a third-class medal. It was in front of this painting at the Salon that his friend and future biographer André Theuriet first met Bastien, and later wrote this description:

I saw before me a young man, plainly dressed, small, fair, and muscular; his pale face, with its square determined brow, short nose, and spiritual lips, scarcely covered with a blond moustache, was lighted up by two clear blue eyes whose straight and piercing look told of loyalty and indomitable energy. There was roguishness as well as manliness in that mobile face with its flattened features, and a certain cool audacity alternated with signs of sensitiveness and sparkling fun and gaiety.

His initial success was confirmed in 1875 by La Communiante (First Communion), which "reveals, in its intricate detail, Bastien-Lepage’s study of 16th-century northern masters: in examining the work, critics commented on its 'Holbein-like' gravity and spirituality." In 1875, he took second place in the competition for the Prix de Rome with his Angels Appearing to the Shepherds, exhibited again at the Exposition Universelle in 1878. His next attempt to win the Prix de Rome in 1876 with Priam at the Feet of Achilles was again unsuccessful, and the painter decided to leave behind Academic subject matter and take inspiration from country life. (His friend Prince Bojidar Karageorgevitch later wrote that it was never Bastien's intention to go to Rome, where the classical training held no interest for him, but winning the prize was a great honor which he had hoped would be his.)

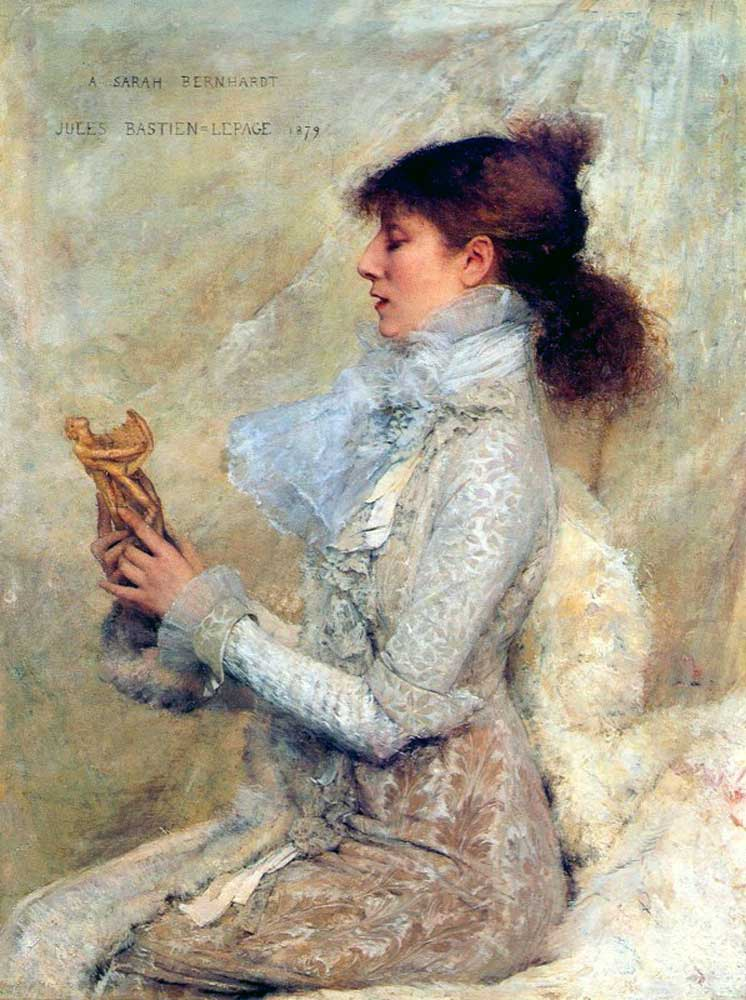
Portrait of Sarah Bernhardt, 1879

One of his submissions to the Salon of 1878, Les Foins (Haymaking), now in the Musée d'Orsay, was widely praised by critics and the public alike, and secured his status as the leader of the emerging Naturalist school. By 1883, a critic could proclaim, "The whole world paints so much today like M. Bastien-Lepage that M. Bastien-Lepage seems to paint like the whole world." This fame brought him prominent commissions.

His Portrait of Sarah Bernhardt of 1879, painted in a light key, won him the cross of the Legion of Honour. At the Salon of 1880 he exhibited an historical painting of Joan of Arc (now in the Metropolitan Museum of Art); and in the same year, at the Royal Academy, his small portrait of the Prince of Wales.

Gabriel P. Weisberg writes of Bastien-Lepage's influences and the way he turned them into something new:

In his handling of a rich, thick paint texture he owed much to an awareness of earlier Realist painters such as Courbet; he was also influenced by Whistler and possibly John Singer Sargent. Bastien-Lepage’s ability to keep certain areas of his canvas free from reworking also reflected an awareness of Impressionistic broken brushstroke painting and an immediacy of touch. However, other sections of a work reflected a painstaking exactitude, suggestive of a classical training and an interest in photographic detail. This technique, as well as the subject-matter of his paintings, made him seem compellingly modern when his work was shown at Salons in Paris and exhibitions in London.

Upon the death of Léon Gambetta, 1 December 1882, "Bastien was commissioned to make a design for the funeral car in which the great orator was to be conveyed to Père Lachaise; he spent a week in the little room at Ville d'Avray, painting the picture representing the statesman on his death-bed." The artist himself was by this time suffering from the cancer that would eventually kill him.

== Illness and Death ==
Self-portrait drawn shortly before his death in 1884.

By January of 1883, Bastien was complaining of frequent digestive troubles and "pains in his loins." In May of 1883, he consulted his longtime friend and physician, Dr. Watelet , who detected a tumor on his left testicle. An operation (described by Watelet as "radical" and by Theuriet as "sharp and painful") was performed to remove the tumor, after which Bastien went to the seaside at Concarneau to convalesce. When Theuriet saw the artist in October of 1883, "he appeared to be recovered; but digestion was still a difficulty, and his habitual gaiety was, as it were, clouded over...he was indulgent, and even affectionate, much more than was usual with him. He did not stay long in Paris, but hastened back to Damvillers...in time to be present during his grandfather's last moments...a painful blow to the survivors."

According to Dr. Watelet, his patient's only further treatment option was "a terrible operation, castration, which could only be palliative and give the maximum of two years of existence," as the cancer was certain to "recur fatally in the intestine or in the kidneys." Whether because this prognosis was kept from him, or because he wished to keep his condition private, Bastien told Theuriet, "It is the digestive tube that is out of order...My stomach was beginning to get wrong, but it is better!" When Bastien returned to Paris, Theuriet "was distressed at the change that had come over him. His thin face had become quite bloodless; the skin of his neck was peeling off; his hair seemed to have no life in it. His questioning blue eyes expressed an anguish and weariness that was heartrending."

Bastien took a two-month trip to Algiers with his mother, telling Theuriet, "Perhaps the Algiers sun will cure me." The exotic surroundings at least provided a distraction. He wrote to Theuriet,

If one did not know it beforehand, one would never dream that amongst these cubes of plaster thousands of men are walking, talking, sleeping, men of noble manner, proud and calm, and with something very like indifference or contempt for us. And they are right. They are beautiful, we are ugly. What matter is it to me that they are knaves! They are beautiful!...Yesterday...I had to go three or four hundred steps through streets full of merchants. In a passage...were three Arabs—an old man, another of middle age, the third about seventeen...The youngest was superb—so handsome that mama was struck with it. "They are like beautiful statues," said she...It was cold and draughty in this passage, which brought me back to the fact of my poor crazy legs. I long for the time when I shall be a man again; what lovely things I shall see, and perhaps I shall do!

When Bastien returned to Paris, Theuriet was "shocked at the progress the disease had made," and he recounts in poignant detail the "cruel agony" of the artist's last months.

The artist's friend Prince Bojidar Karageorgevitch was with him at the end, and wrote:

At last he was unable to work anymore; and he died on the 10th of December, 1884, breathing his last in my arms. At his grave's head his mother and brother planted an apple-tree.

== l'affaire Watelet ==
Portrait of Dr. Watelet, 1880.

A controversy followed upon Bastien-Lepage's death that would become known as l'affaire Watelet (the Watelet Affair). On the morning of 13 December 1884, the newspaper Le Voltaire ran a story which said that the artist's doctors, including "Watelin" [sic], "found in the abdominal region a tumor placed in such a way that an operation was impossible. It was therefore necessary to abandon the patient to an imminent death...The climate of Algeria...only accelerated the development of Bastien-Lepage's disease."

Dr. Watelet felt that his integrity was impugned by the item, and on the same day, in the afternoon edition of Le Matin, he published a letter that refuted the story in Le Voltaire by giving explicit details of Bastien's diagnosis and treatment. There had apparently been a falling-out between the doctor and those caring for the artist upon his return to Paris; Watelet wrote, "For nearly ten years, I was Bastien-Lepage's confidant and physician, and in his last moments, on his return from Algiers, an infamous coterie kept me away from his bedside, after having persuaded his poor mother and brother that I had sent him to die there [in Algiers] to relieve my responsibility, no doubt."

Charges were brought against Dr. Watelet for having violated French law regarding professional secrecy. In 1885, the court of cassation found him guilty, ruling that under French law a doctor's motives for such a breach of confidentially were immaterial, and that secrecy "covers not only what has been confided by the patient but also everything that the doctor has seen, heard or understood."

== Legacy ==
A copy of Rodin's sculpture of Bastien-Lepage in the garden of the Musée Rodin in Paris.

In March and April 1885, a memorial exhibition of more than 200 of his pictures was mounted by the École des Beaux-Arts. In 1889 some of his best-known work was shown at the Paris Exposition Universelle.

A monument to Bastien-Page, designed by his brother Émile and surmounted by a statue by Rodin depicting the artist with his palette and brush, was erected at Damvillers.

A museum is devoted to him at Montmédy.

The influential English critic Roger Fry credited the wider public's acceptance of the Impressionists, especially Claude Monet, to Bastien-Lepage. In his 1920 "Essay in Æsthetics", Fry wrote:

Monet is an artist whose chief claim to recognition lies in the fact of his astonishing power of faithfully reproducing certain aspects of nature, but his really naive innocence and sincerity was taken by the public to be the most audacious humbug, and it required the teaching of men like Bastien-Lepage, who cleverly compromised between the truth and an accepted convention of what things looked like, to bring the world gradually around to admitting truths which a single walk in the country with purely unbiassed vision would have established beyond doubt.

Gabriel P. Weisberg notes that "British artists, especially George Clausen and Henry Herbert La Thangue, Australians such as Tom Roberts and Americans such as Julian Alden Weir were deeply affected by his compositions and complex and varied painting technique."

His work was also a strong influence on the young Ukrainian painter Marie Bashkirtseff. "He is not only a painter," she wrote, "he is a poet, a psychologist, a metaphysician, a creator." She was also in failing health, suffering from tuberculosis. The two became close friends, and the later pages of Bashkirtseff's journal record her visits to the dying painter. She died shortly before Bastien, at the age of twenty-five. Her sepulchral chapel in Passy Cemetery was designed by Bastien's younger brother, Émile.

An auction record for one of his paintings was set by Portrait of Sarah Bernhardt (1879), which sold for $2,280,000 at Christie's in 2022.

== Gallery ==
Chanson du Printemps, 1874, Musée de la Princerie, Verdun

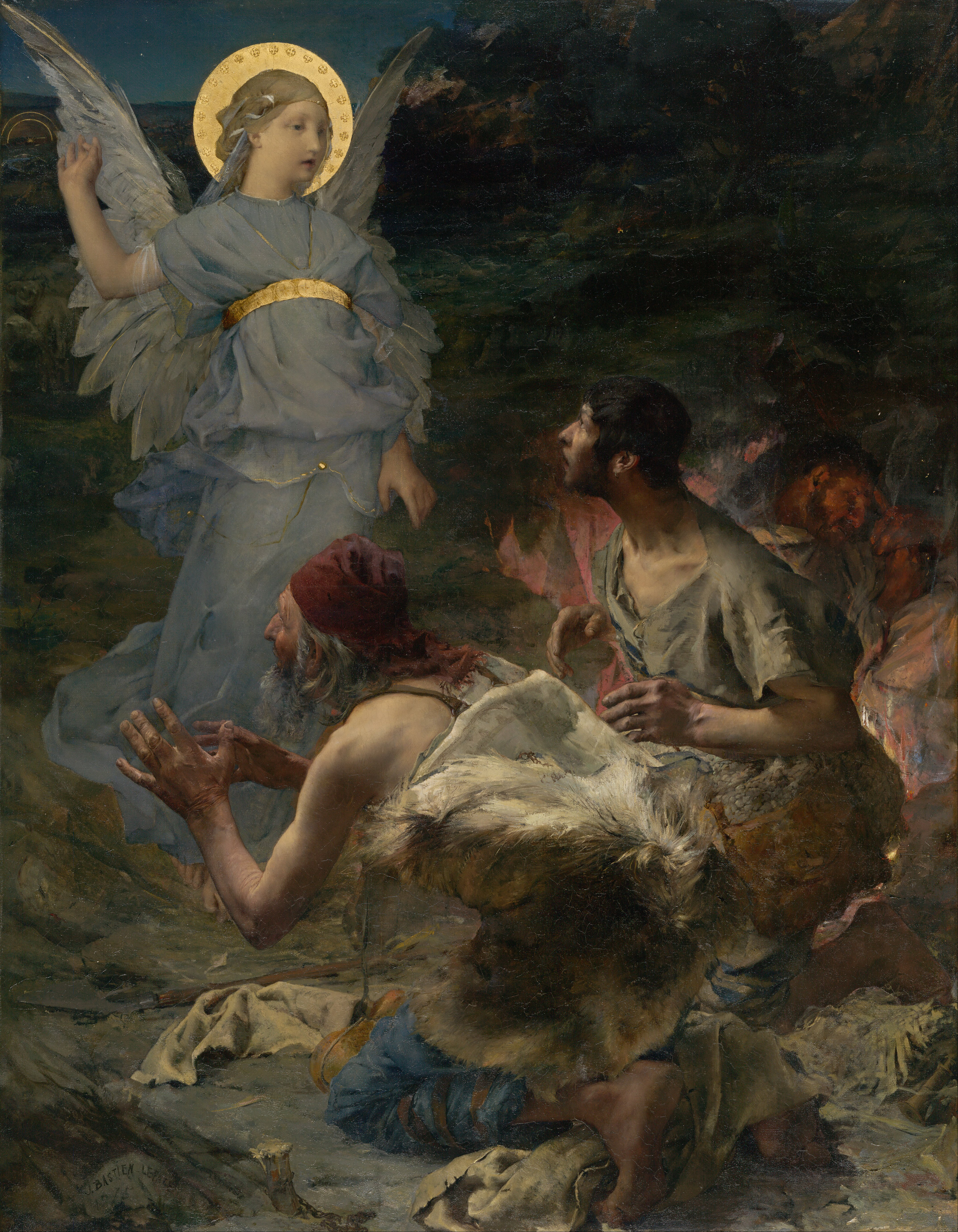
The Annunciation to the Shepherds, 1875, National Gallery of Victoria, Melbourne

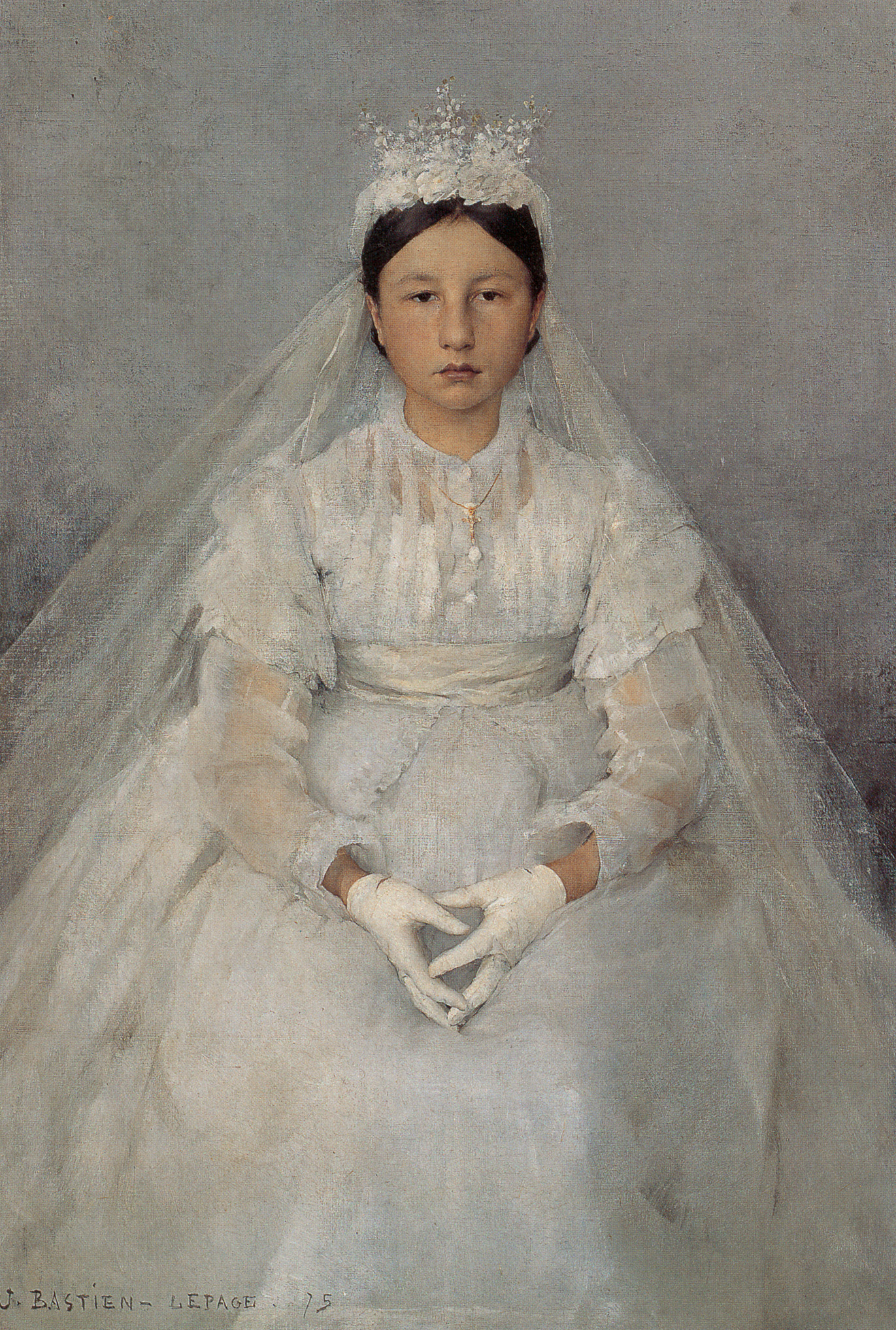
La Communiante, 1875, Musée des Beaux-Arts de Tournai

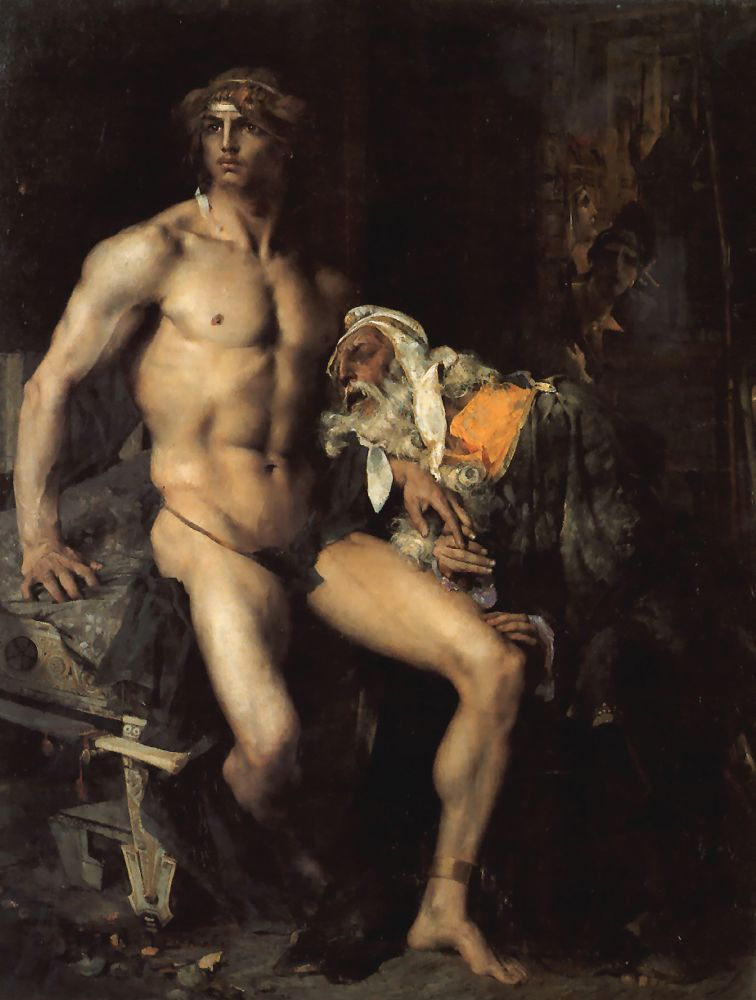
Achilles and Priam, 1876, Palais des Beaux-Arts de Lille

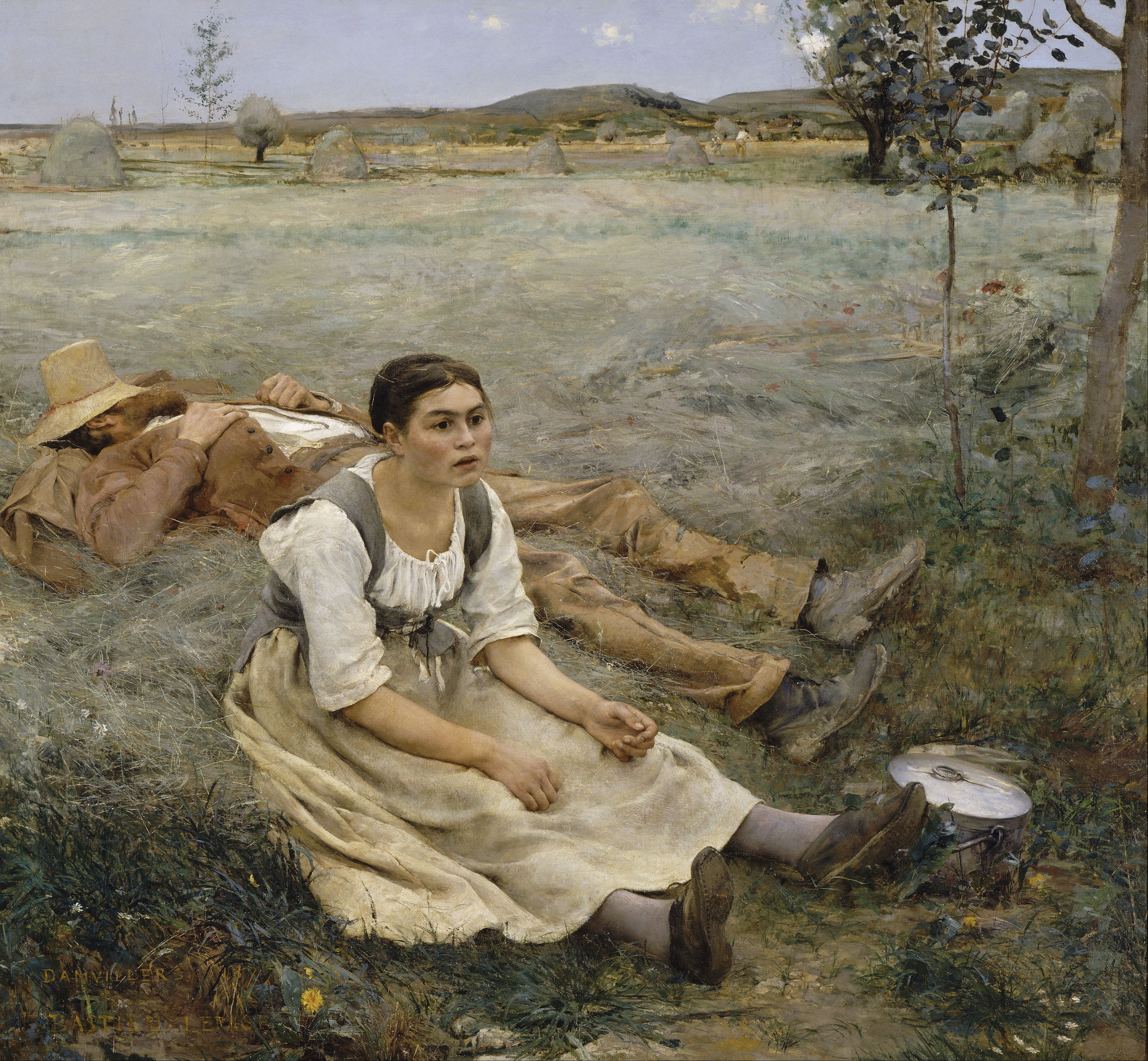
Haymaking (Les Foins), 1877, Musée d'Orsay

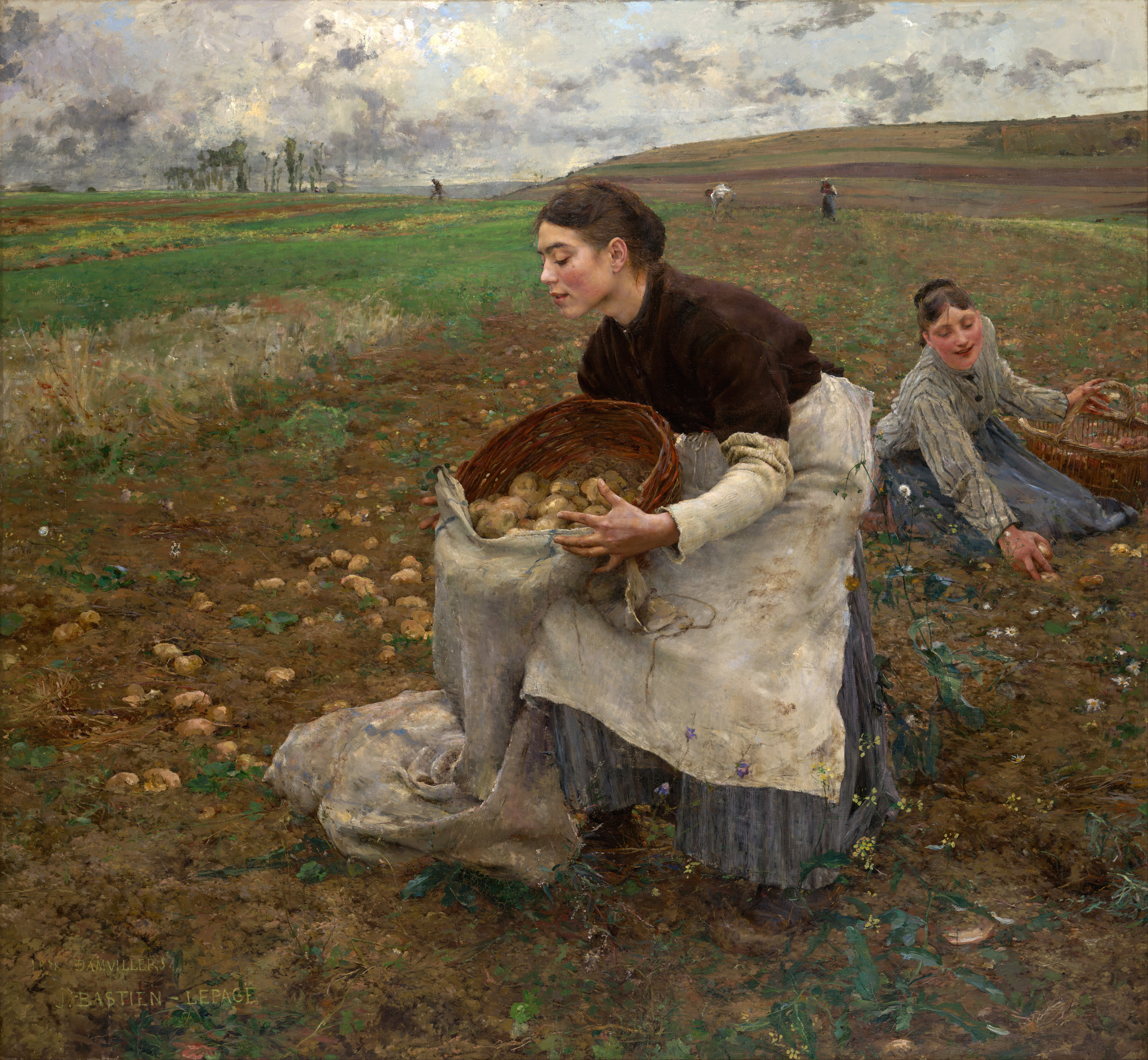
October, 1878, National Gallery of Victoria

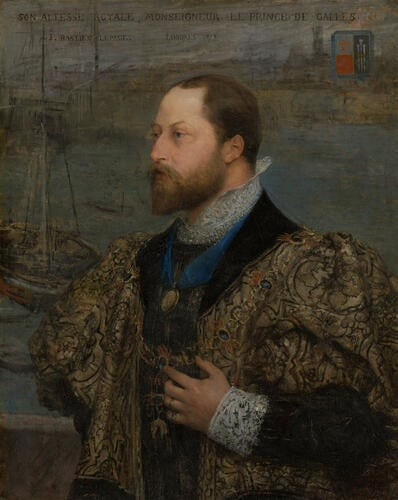
Portrait of the Prince of Wales, 1879, Royal Collection

Joan of Arc, 1879, Metropolitan Museum of Art

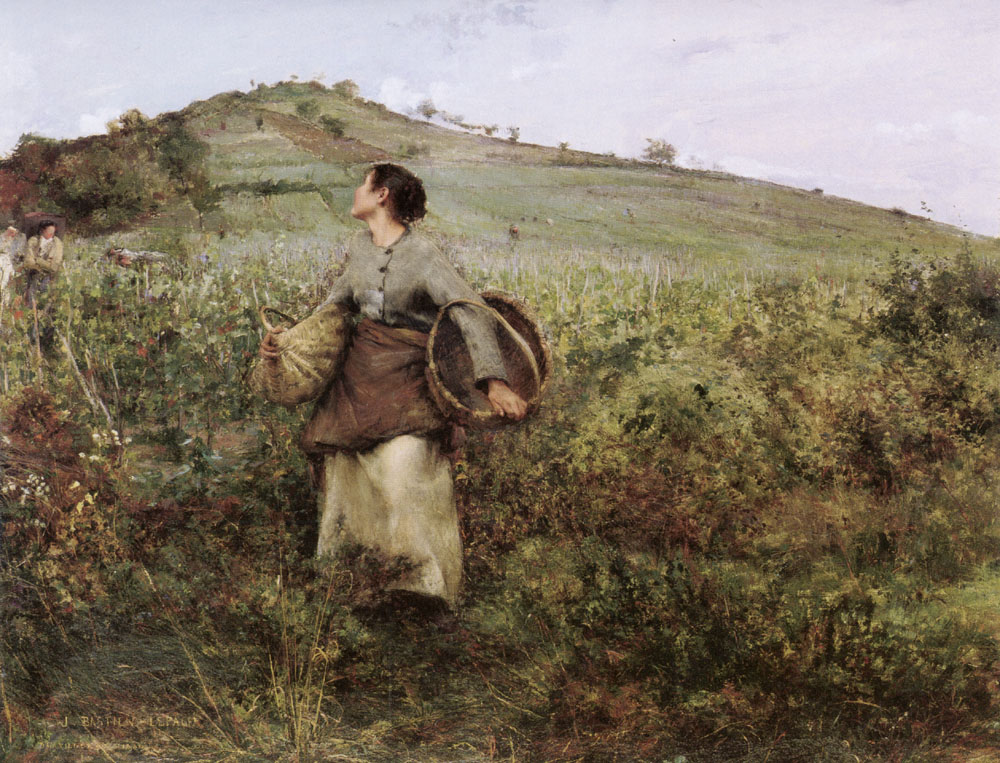
Harvest Time, 1880, Van Gogh Museum

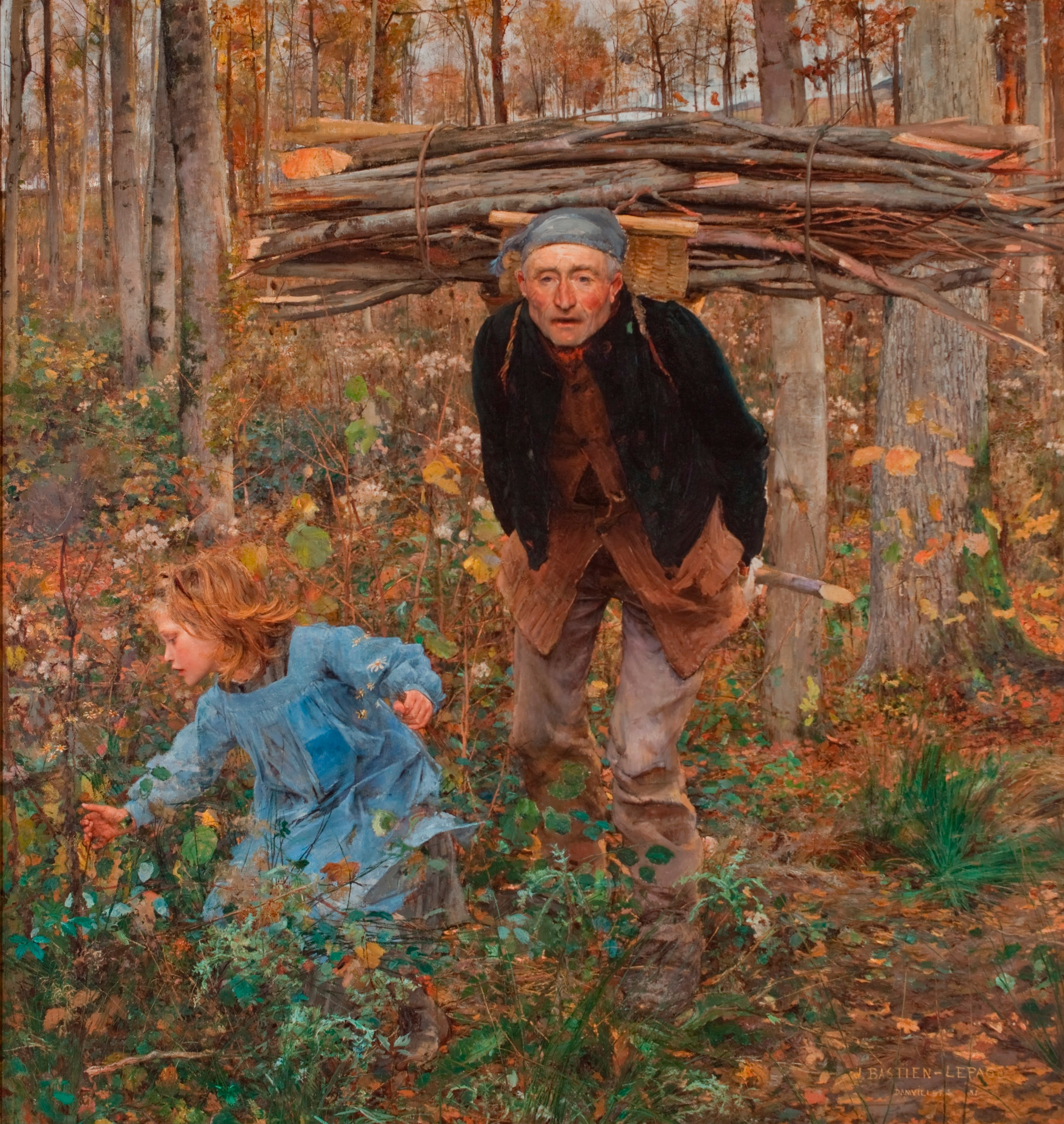
Le Père Jacques (The Wood Gatherer), 1881, Milwaukee Art Museum

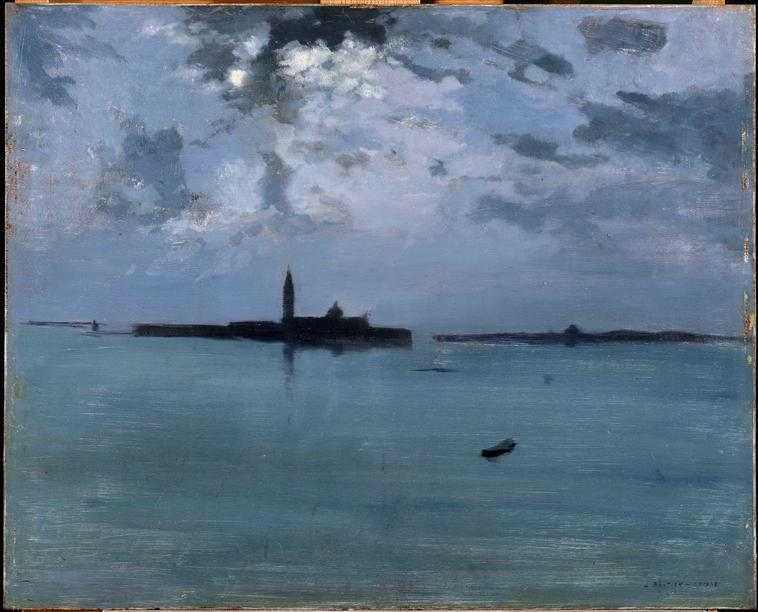
La nuit sur la lagune, 1880-1881, Musée Magnin, Dijon

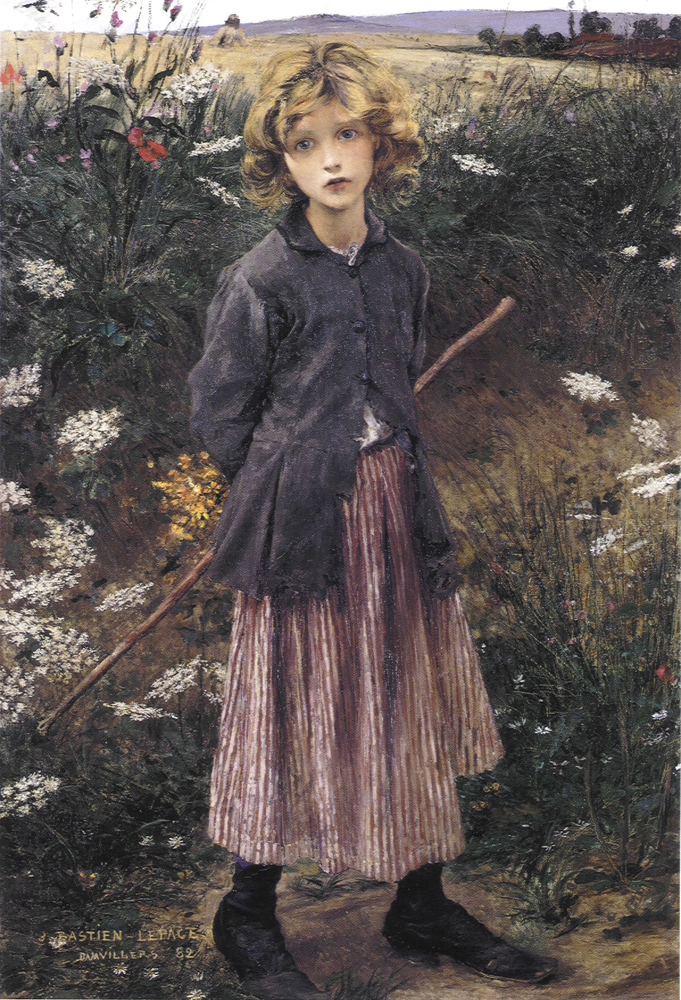
Young Girl, 1881

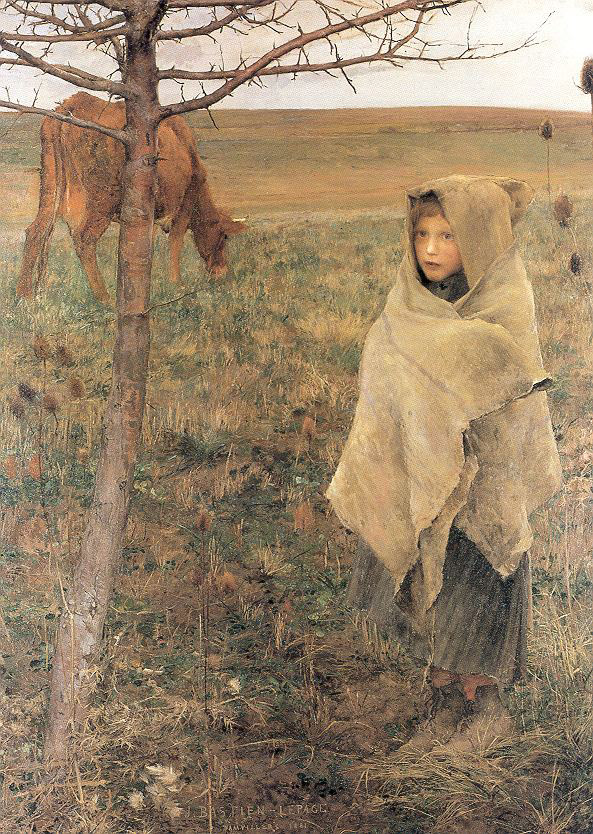
Pauvre Fauvette, 1881, Kelvingrove Art Gallery and Museum

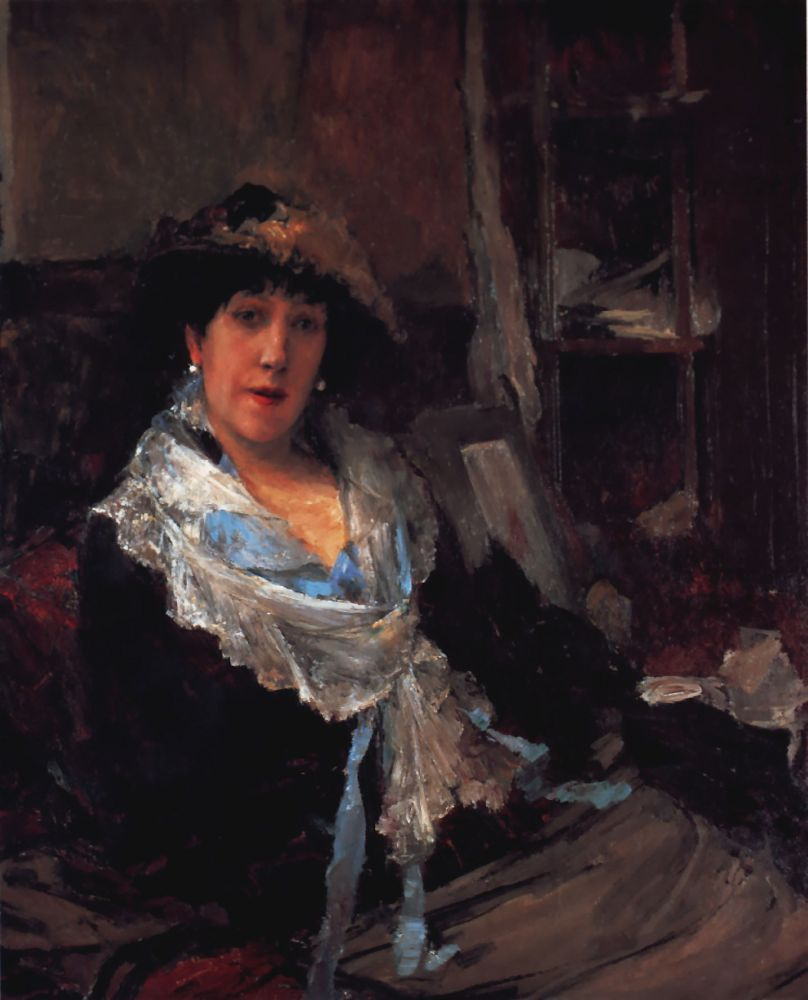
Marie Samary of the Odéon Theater, c. 1881, Cleveland Museum of Art

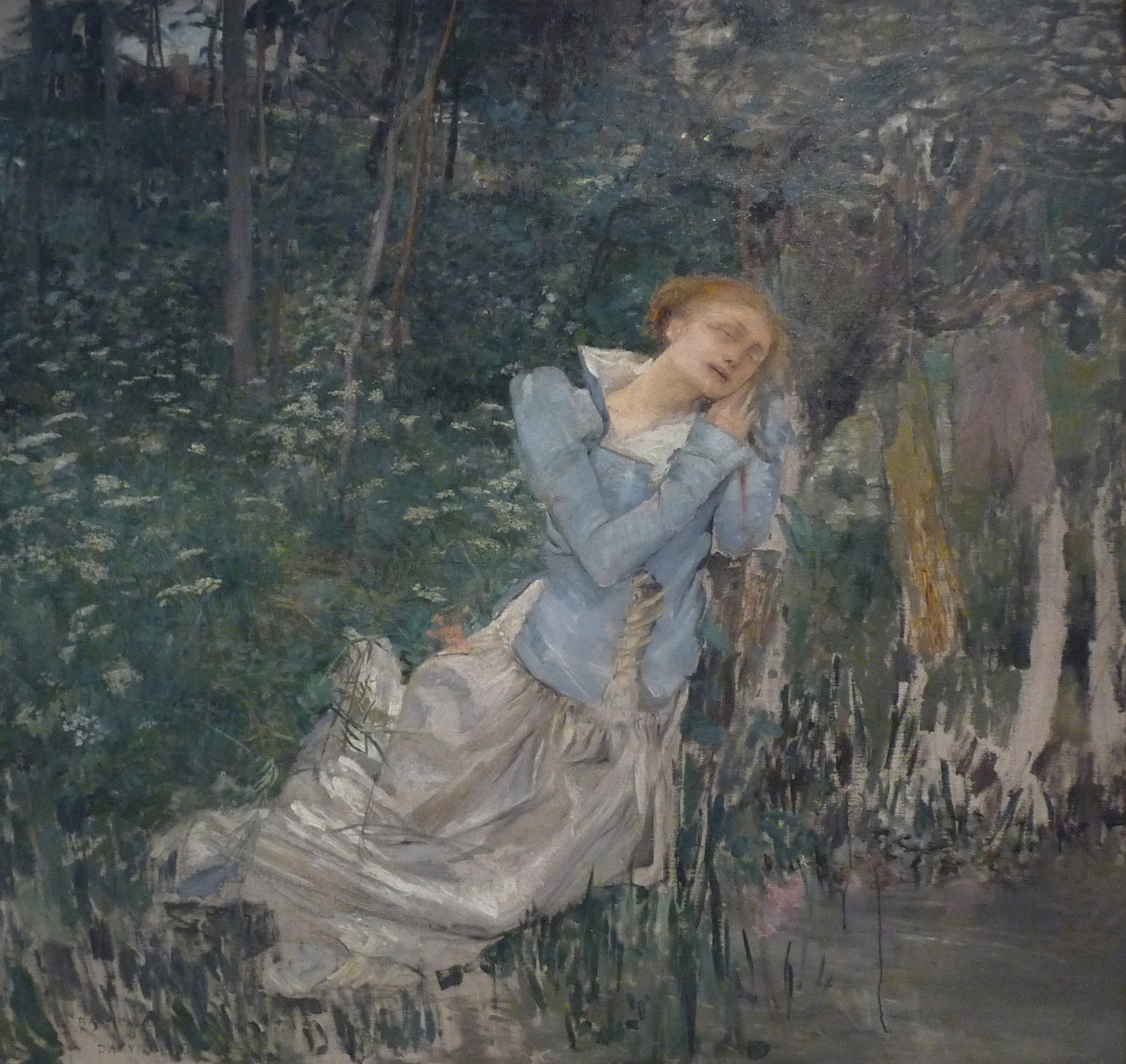
Ophelia, 1881, Museum of Fine Arts of Nancy

Flower Merchant in London, 1882, Museum of Fine Arts, Houston

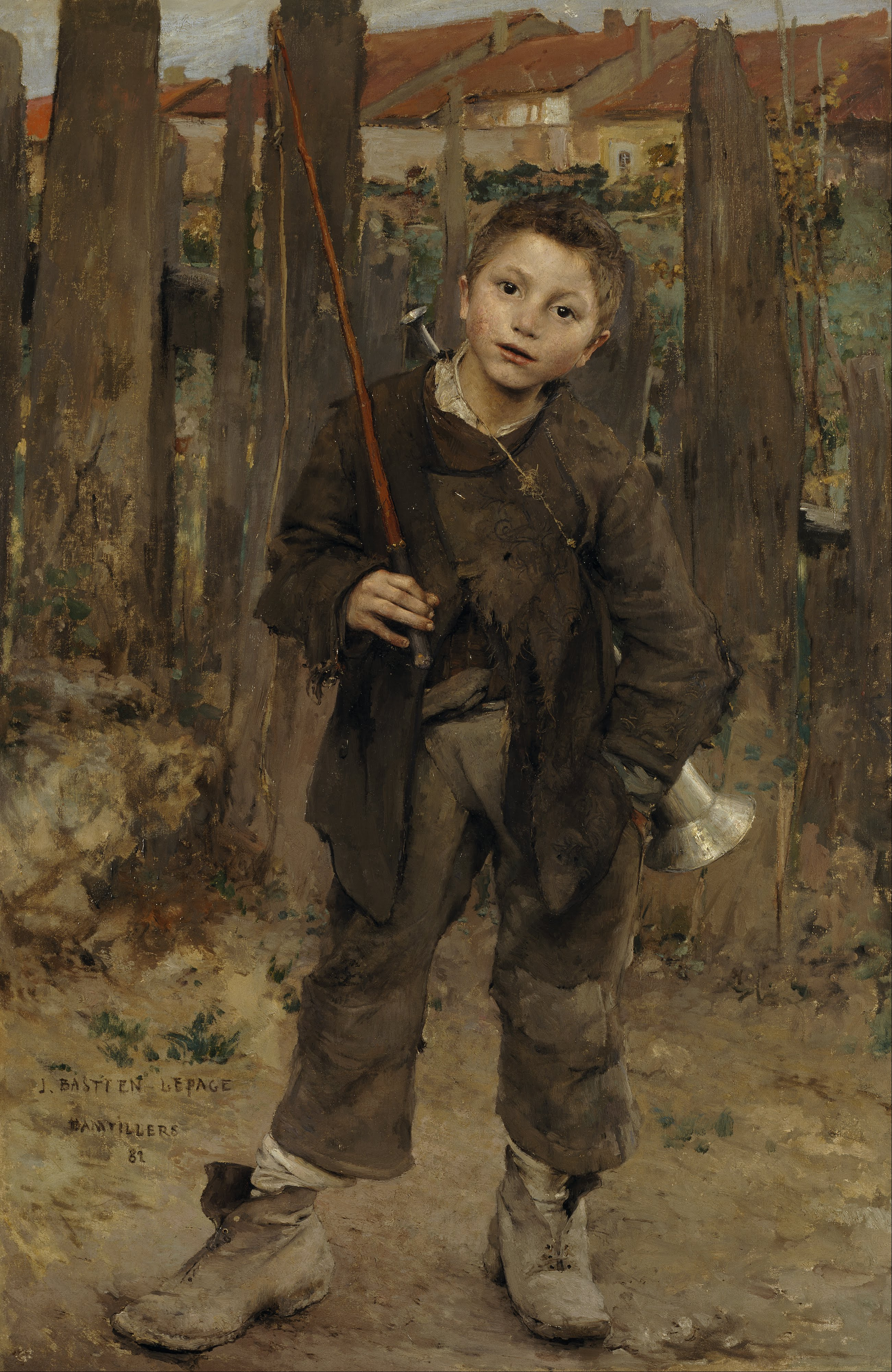
Pas Mèche (Nothing Doing), 1882, Scottish National Gallery

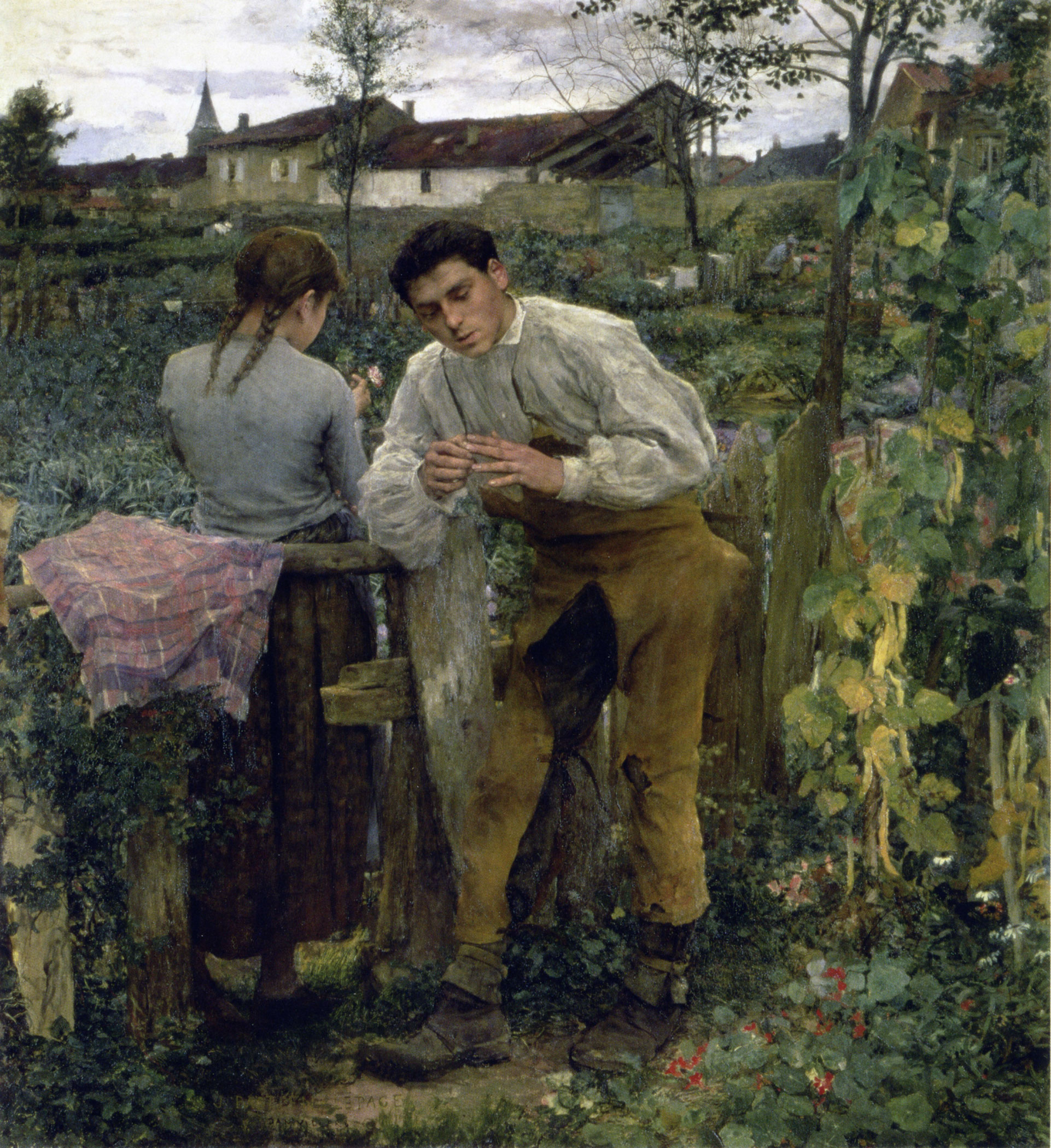
L'Amour au Village, 1882, Pushkin Museum

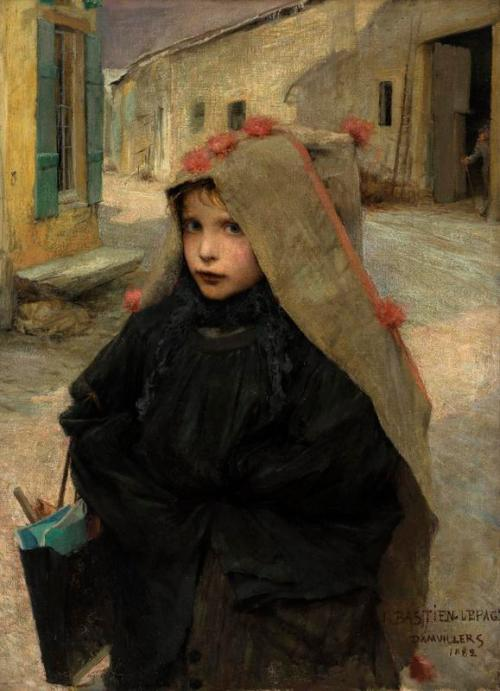
Going to School, 1882, Aberdeen Art Gallery

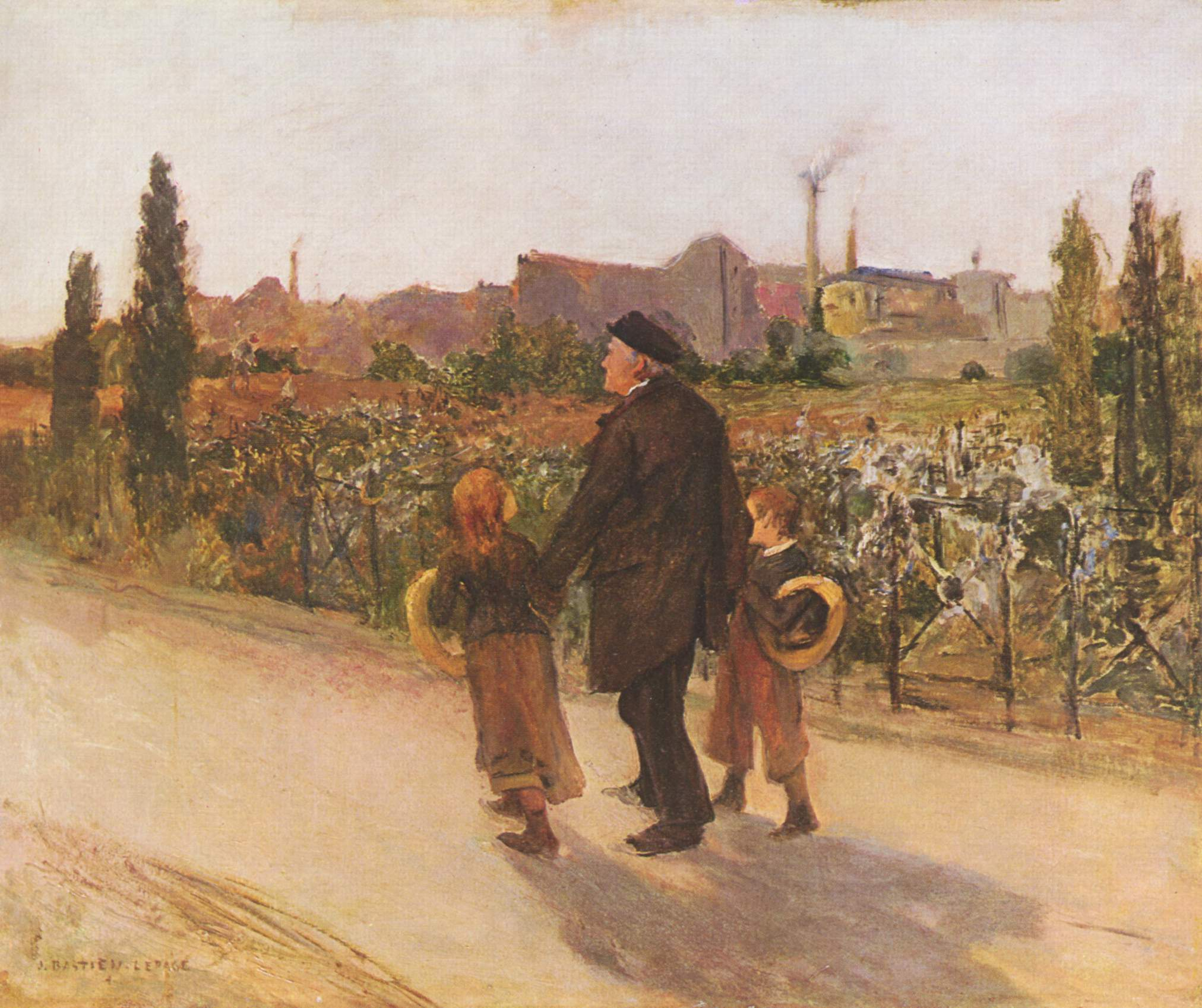
All Souls' Day, c. 1882, Hungarian National Gallery

Victor Hugo en 1882, Maison de Victor Hugo, Paris

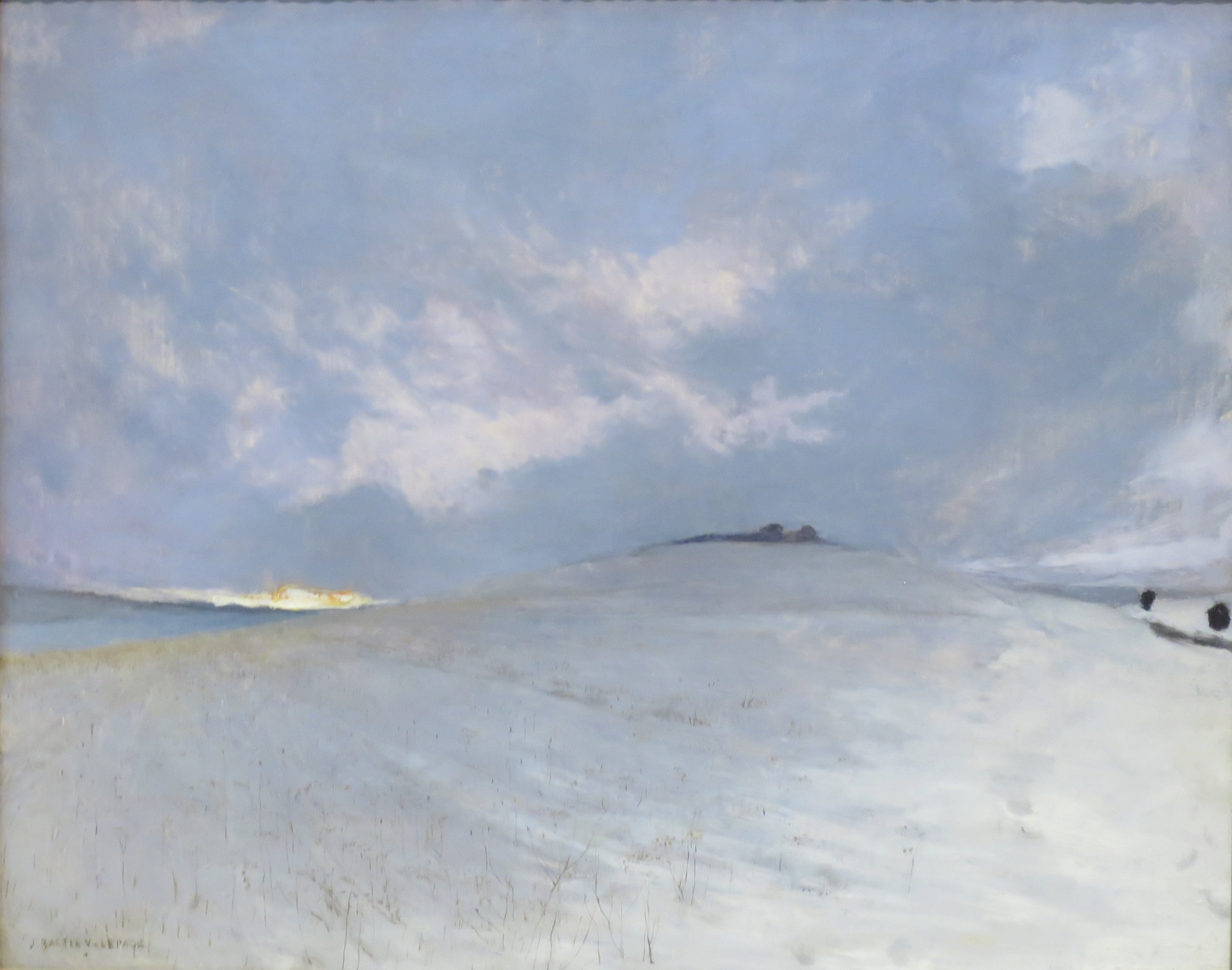
Snow Effect, Damvillers, c. 1882, Legion of Honor, San Francisco

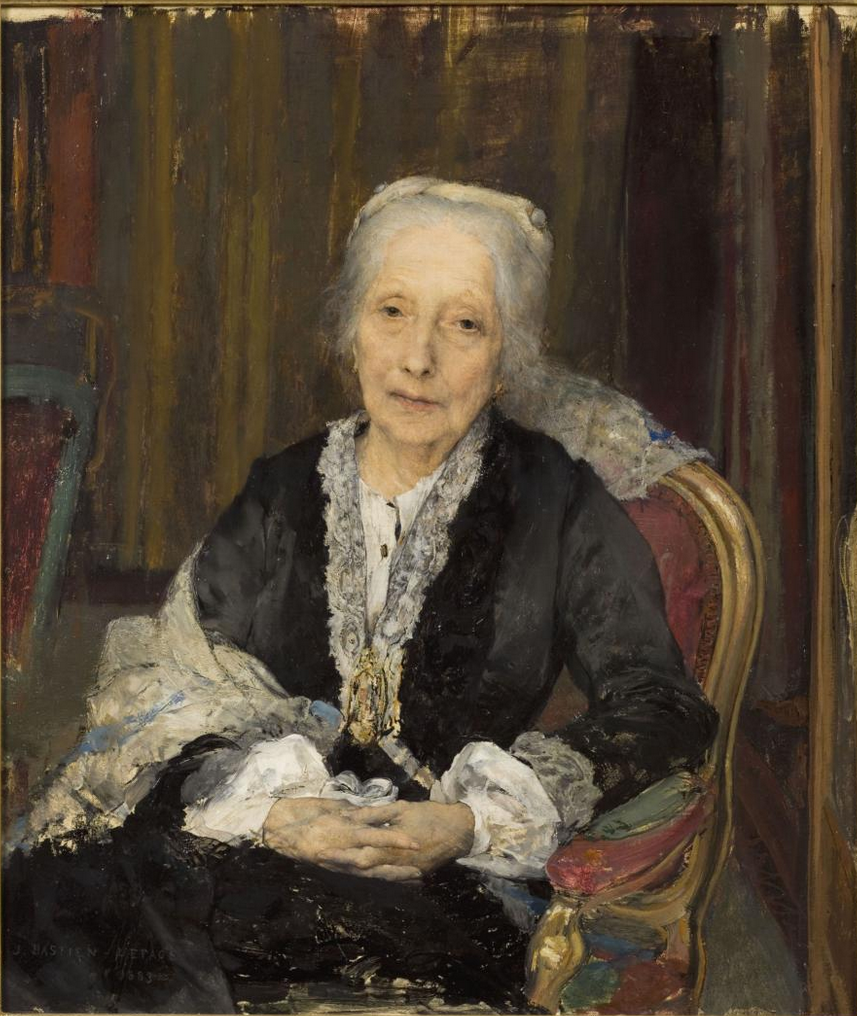
Portrait of Juliette Drouet (actress and mistress of Victor Hugo), 1883

== Sources ==
- Aubrun, Marie-Madeleine. Jules Bastien-Lepage, 1848-1884: catalogue raisonné de l'oeuvre, Paris, 1985.
- Cartwright, Julia (Mrs. Henry Ady), Jules Bastien-Lepage, London: Seeley and Co., 1894.
- Crastre, François, Bastien Lepage, tr. from the French by Frederic Taber Cooper, New York: Frederick A. Stokes Company, 1914.
- Lemoine, Serge, and Dominique Lobstein, Marie Lecasseur, et al. Jules Bastien-Lepage 1848–1884 (Paris: Musée d'Orsay, 2007).
- Theuriet, André, Jules Bastien-Lepage and his art: a memoir, including "Jules Bastien-Lepage as artist" by George Clausen, "Modern realism in painting" by Walter Sickert, and "A study of Marie Bashkirtseff" by Mathilde Blind, illustrated with reproductions of Bastien-Lepage's and Marie Bashkirtseff's works, London: T. Fisher Unwin, 1892.
- Young, Marnin. "The Motionless Look of a Painting: Jules-Bastien Lepage, Les Foins, and the End of Realism", Art History, vol. 37, no. 1 (February 2014): 38–67.
