= Émile Bastien-Lepage =

French painter and architect (1854–1938)

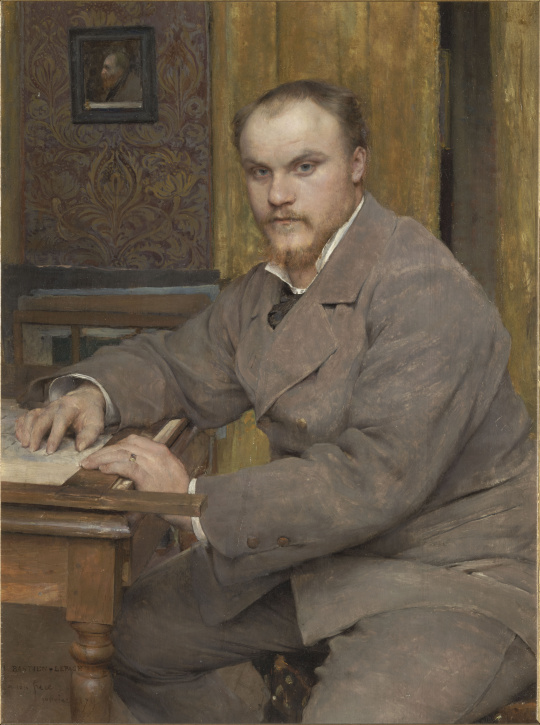
- Born: 20 January 1854; Damvillers
- Died: 19 January 1938; Neuilly-sur-Seine
- Occupations: Painter, architect
- Relatives: Jules Bastien-Lepage
- Awards: Chevalier of the Legion of Honour (1934)

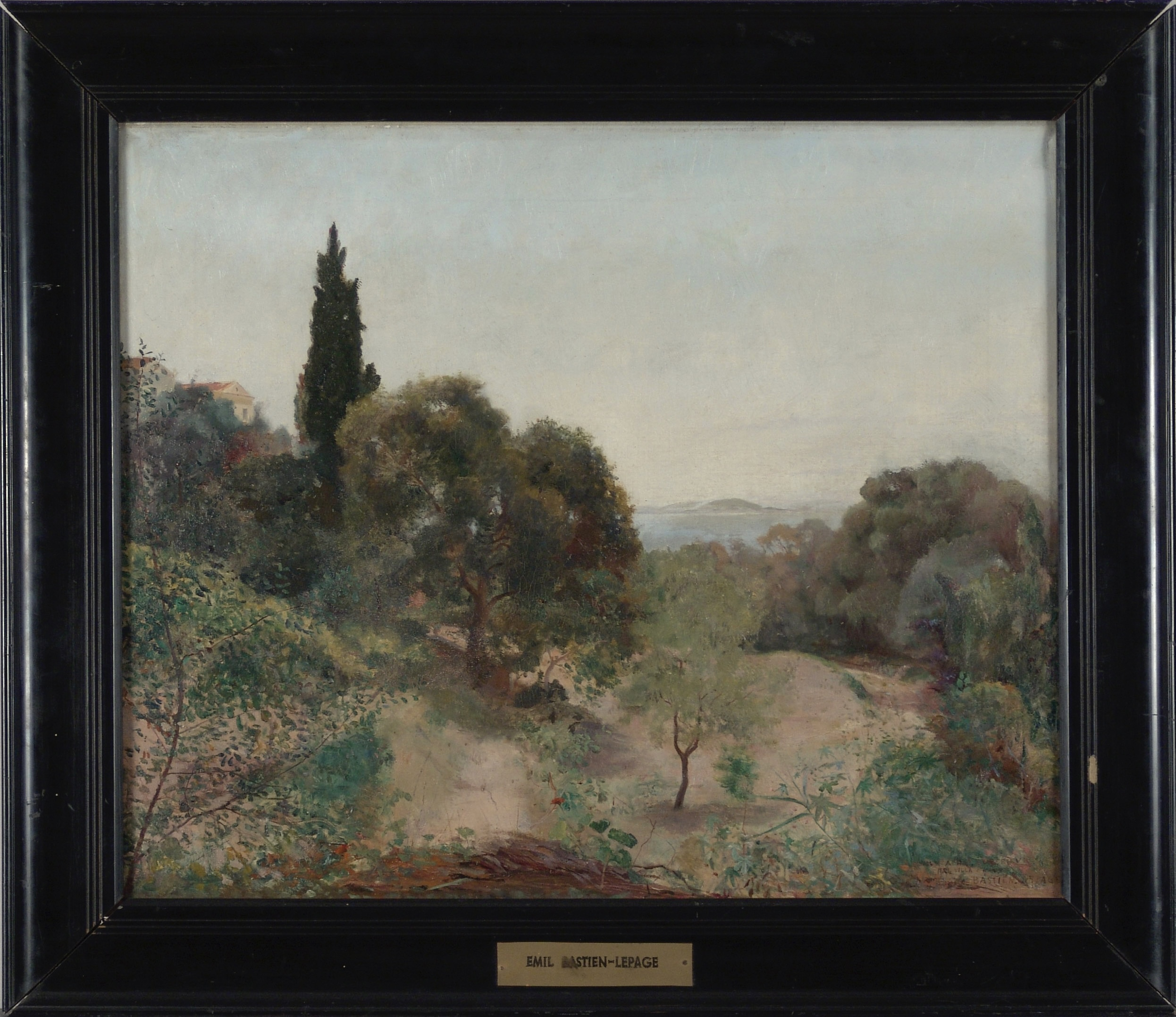
Landscape (Villa Chauve) by Émile Bastien-Lepage, 1884 (Finnish National Gallery)

Émile Bastien-Lepage (20 January 1854 – 19 January 1938) was a French painter and architect, younger brother of Jules Bastien-Lepage. His works include After the War, The Darling of the Meadow and Near Damvillers.

Born in Damvillers to Claude Bastien and Adèle Lepage, he studied under Jules, who also painted his portrait in 1879, a work now in the Musée d'Orsay. He was a member of the Société des Artistes Français and exhibited at its salon in 1884 and 1889. He was also a member of the Société Nationale des Beaux-Arts and exhibited at its salon. In 1889, he also designed a plinth for Auguste Rodin's statue of Jules. Émile himself died at Neuilly-sur-Seine.

== Biography ==
Son of Claude Bastien and Adèle Lepage, brother and pupil of Jules Bastien-Lepage (1848-1884), who painted his portrait in 1879 (Paris,Musée d'Orsay), Émile Bastien-Lepage was a member of the Société des Artistes Français and exhibited at the Salon des artistes français in 1884 and 1889, as well as at the Société Nationale des Beaux-Arts, of which he was a member.

His works include Intérieur paysan à Damvillers (1882), Villa chauve (1884), Homme déversant une brouette (1891).

In 1929, his paintings Après la guerre (After the War), Le Doyen de la prairie (The Dean of the Meadow), and Autour de Damvillers (Around Damvillers) were noticed.
