= Oktober =

Oktober may refer to:

- Forlaget Oktober, a Norwegian publishing house;
- Oktober, a character in The Quiller Memorandum;
- Oktober, a British television series;

== See also ==
- October (disambiguation)
