= Novembre =

Novembre (French and Italian for 'November') may refer to:

== Arts and entertainment ==
- "Novembre" (song), by Giusy Ferreri, 2008
- Novembre (band), an Italian heavy metal band
- Novembre (film), a 2022 French film also titled as November

== People ==
- Cristiano Novembre (born 1987), Italian footballer
- Fabio Novembre (born 1966), Italian architect and designer
- John Novembre (born 1977/1978), American computational biologist
- Tom Novembre (born 1959), French actor and singer

== See also ==
- November (disambiguation)
- Noviembre (film), a 2003 Spanish film
