= October (disambiguation) =

October is the 10th month of the year.

October may also refer to:

- October (Roman month), the eighth of 10 months in the oldest Roman calendar

== Publications ==
- October (journal), a journal published by the MIT Press
- October (magazine), an Egyptian Arabic political weekly
- October (novel), a 2014 novel by Zoë Wicomb
- October, by Louise Glück, 2004
- October, by Christopher Isherwood and Don Bachardy, 1982
- October, a 2017 history of the Russian Revolution, by China Miéville
- October, a 2018 zine by Jeremy Bolm

=== In other languages ===
- Octubre (magazine), a former Spanish literary magazine
- Oktyabr (magazine), a former Russian literary magazine
- Tishreen (newspaper) (Arabic: October), Syrian state controlled daily newspaper

== Film and TV ==
- October: Ten Days That Shook the World, a 1928 film directed by Sergei Eisenstein telling the story of the 1917 October Revolution
- October (2010 film), a 2010 Peruvian film directed by brothers Daniel and Diego Vega Vidal
- October (2018 film), a 2018 Indian film directed by Shoojit Sircar
- October (upcoming film), an upcoming action horror film

== Music ==
- October (Shostakovich), a 1967 symphonic poem by Dmitri Shostakovich
- "October" (Whitacre), a composition for concert band composed by Eric Whitacre
- October (musician) (born 1997), stage name of Emma Logan, New Zealand singer, songwriter, record producer, and model
- October London (born 1986), American singer and songwriter

=== Albums ===
- October (Claire Hamill album), 1973
- October (soundtrack album), by Shantanu Moitra, Abhishek Arora and Anupam Roy for the 2018 Indian film
- October (U2 album), 1981
- October (EP), a 2003 EP by The Funeral Pyre
- Octobre (album), 2015 album by Les Cowboys Fringants

=== Songs ===
- "October" (song), a 1981 song by U2
- "October", a song by a-ha from their 1986 album Scoundrel Days
- "October", a song by FM Static from their 2003 album What Are You Waiting For?
- "October", an instrumental by Deadmau5 from his 2012 album Album Title Goes Here

== Places ==
- Cape October, Severnaya Zemlya
- October Mountain, Massachusetts

== Other uses ==
- October (software), a content management system based on PHP and the Laravel web framework
- October (painting), a painting by Jules Bastien-Lepage

== See also ==
- Oktober (disambiguation)
- Oktyabr (disambiguation)
