= Haymaking (Bastien-Lepage) =

1877 painting by Jules Bastien-Lepage

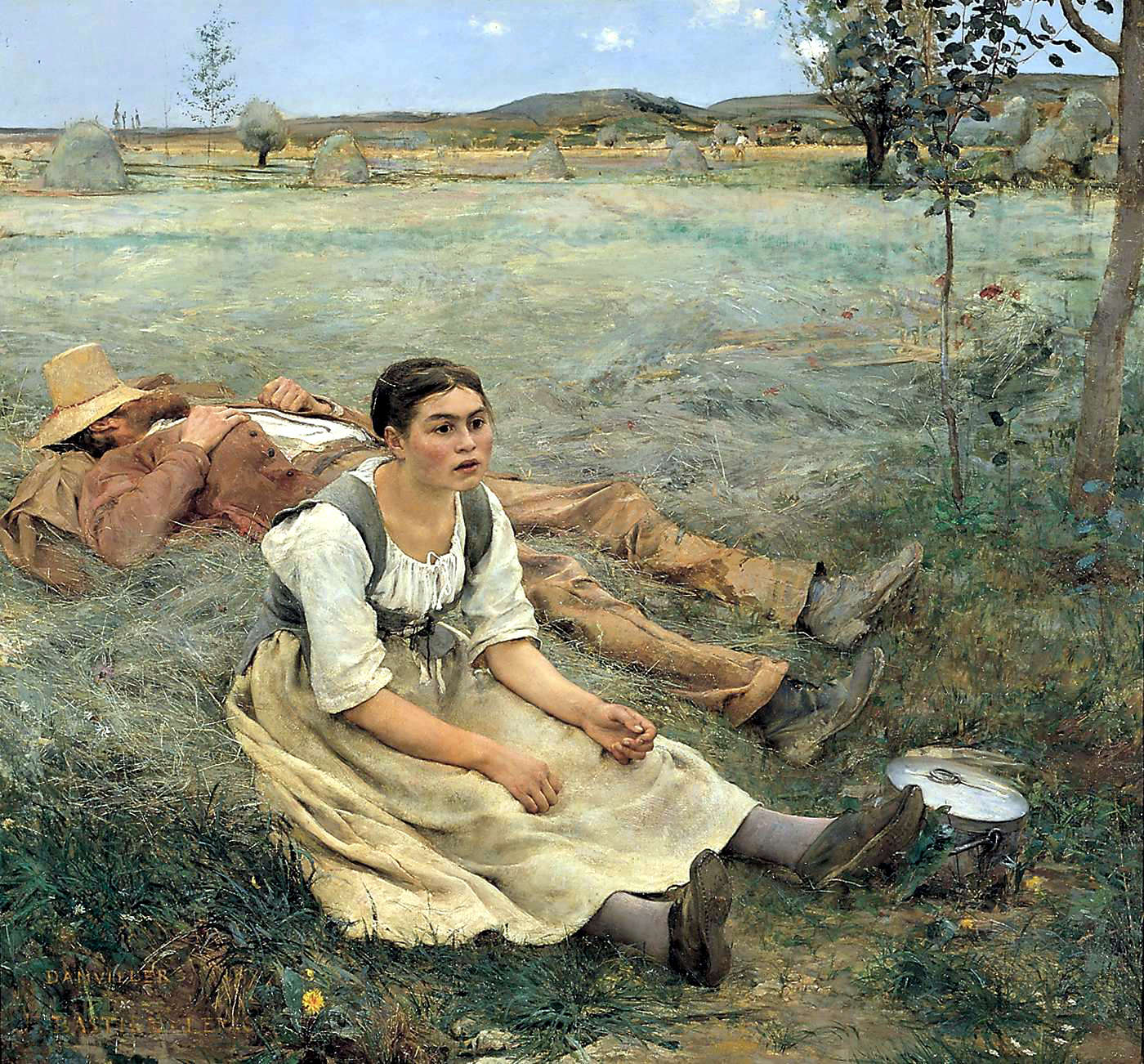
- Artist: Jules Bastien-Lepage
- Year: 1877
- Medium: Oil on canvas
- Dimensions: 209 x 225 cm
- Location: Musée d'Orsay, Paris

Haymaking (French: Les foins), or Resting in the Fields, is an oil on canvas painting by Jules Bastien-Lepage, from 1877. First exhibited at the Salon of 1878 in Paris, it was acquired by the Musée du Luxembourg in 1885 at the posthumous sale of the artist's works. It passed to the Louvre in 1929 and then to its current home in the Musée d'Orsay, in Paris, in 1980.

== Description ==
The painting depicts two peasants, a man and a woman, resting from hard work, in a field. The man is lying on the mown grass, his face is hidden by a straw hat, which allows his beard to be seen, but not the top of his face. The young peasant woman is seated, but her pose and her look express her extreme exhaustion. It is worth noting the seemingly photographic composition of the painting: the horizon line is located at a very high point so that the majority of its surface is occupied in the background by mown grass and haystacks, and the sky is visible only on a small strip of canvas.

== Reception ==
Novelist Émile Zola highly praised Bastien-Lepage as the "grandson of Jean-François Millet and Gustave Courbet", and considered Haymaking as a masterpiece of naturalism in painting.

Soviet art critic Nina Yarovskaya also praised this painting: "Les Foins is Bastien-Lepage's best painting. Exhibited at the Paris Salon of 1878, it is far from the idyllic interpretations of the peasant theme which characterizes several of his paintings. It faithfully depicts peasants lying exhausted from work under a scorching sun. The posture of the exhausted woman is very expressive with her hands lowered, her head slightly thrown back. The viewer feels the exhaustion of this woman and the efforts required to make the slightest movement."
