= November (disambiguation) =

November is the eleventh month of the year.

November may also refer to:

== Film and television ==
- November (2003 film), a Spanish film
- November (2004 film), an American film starring Courteney Cox
- November (2017 film), an Estonian film
- November (2022 film), a French film written and directed by Cédric Jimenez
- November (2023 film), a Maldivian film
- November (2025 film), an international co-production
- November (Dollhouse), a character in the TV series Dollhouse

== Literature ==
- November (novella), an 1842 novella by Gustave Flaubert
- November (play), a 2008 play by David Mamet
- "November", a poem by Simon Armitage

== Music ==
- November (band), an early 1970s Swedish hard rock band

=== Albums ===
- November (John Abercrombie album) or the title song, 1993
- November (Sir album), 2018
- November (EP), by Azure Ray, or the title song, 2002
- November, by Bizzey, 2018
- November, by Odd Nordstoga, or the title song, 2010

=== Songs ===
- "November" (song), by Juli, 2005
- "November", by Christie Front Drive from Christie Front Drive, 1997
- "November", by Emerson Drive from What If?, 2004
- "November", by Max Richter from Memoryhouse, 2002
- "November", by Silverstein from When Broken Is Easily Fixed, 2003
- "November", by Tom Waits from The Black Rider, 1993
- "November", by Tyler, The Creator from Flower Boy, 2017

== People ==
- Steve November (born 1972), British television producer
- Siphesihle November (born 1998 or 1999) is a South African ballet dancer

== Other uses ==
- November (Roman month), the ninth month of the Roman calendar
- November-class submarine, a class of Soviet nuclear-powered attack submarines
- N, in the NATO phonetic alphabet
- November, a character in the webcomic No Rest for the Wicked
- No Nut November an Internet challenge

== See also ==
- Novembre (disambiguation)
- Noviembre (film), a 2003 Spanish film directed by Achero Mañas
