= Damvillers =

- Commune
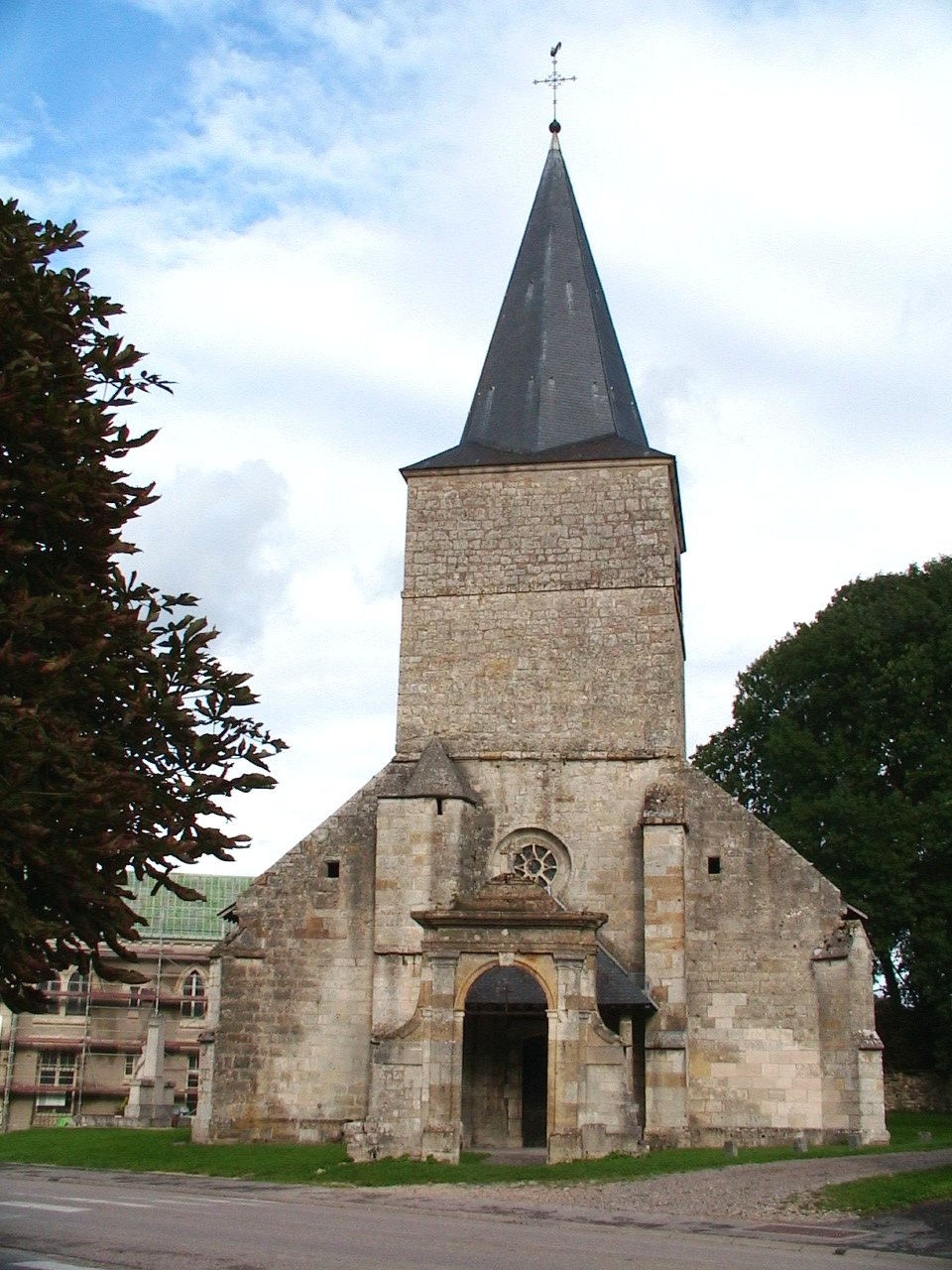
- The church in Damvillers

- Coat of arms
- Location of Damvillers
- Location within France Location within Grand Est
- Coordinates: 49°20′36″N 5°24′02″E
- Country: France
- Region: Grand Est
- Department: Meuse
- Arrondissement: Verdun
- Canton: Montmédy
- Intercommunality: Damvillers Spincourt

Government
  - Mayor (2020–2026): Anne Postal
- Area^{1}: 18.33 km^{2} (7.08 sq mi)
- Elevation: 209 m (686 ft)
- Highest elevation: 353 m (1,158 ft)
- Lowest elevation: 197 m (646 ft)
- Population (2023): 613
  - Density: 33.4/km^{2} (86.6/sq mi)
- Time zone: UTC+01:00 (CET)
  - Summer (DST): UTC+02:00 (CEST)
- INSEE/Postal code: 55145 /55150
- ^{1} French Land Register data, which excludes lakes, ponds, glaciers > 1 km^{2} (0.386 sq mi or 247 acres) and river estuaries.

Damvillers (French pronunciation: [dɑ̃vile]) is a commune in the Meuse department in Grand Est in north-eastern France.

== History ==
Damvillers was part of the Duchy of Luxembourg, which was part of the Spanish Netherlands . In 1552, France intervened in the princes' revolt and French troops laid siege to Damvillers. From 1559, Cristóbal de Mondragón was the governor of the fortress of Damvillers for more than a decade. The former relations with Luxembourg are reflected in the municipality's current coat of arms.

In 1659, the city and the fortress were ceded to the Kingdom of France as a result of the Peace of the Pyrenees.

When Damvillers was besieged in 1552, Ambroise Paré (1510–1590) became the first surgeon to repair an artery during an amputation through use of a Ligature. His new method would soon replace the previously used cauterization.

== Demographics ==
Year	1962	1968	1975	1982	1990	1999	2007	2016	2019
Residents	582	588	631	674	627	620	636	652	626

== See also ==
- Communes of the Meuse department
